= List of bees of Great Britain =

This is a list of bees of Great Britain. The following species are all within the superfamily Apoidea. Over 250 species have been identified in the UK.

== Family Colletidae ==
=== Genus Colletes: plasterer bees ===
- Colletes cunicularius, vernal colletes bee or spring mining-bee
- Colletes daviesanus, Davies' colletes bee; Common in England, scarce in Scotland and Ireland
- Colletes floralis, northern colletes bee
- Colletes fodiens, hairy-saddled colletes bee; Widespread on sandy habitats in England, Wales and southern Scotland
- Colletes halophilus, sea aster bee
- Colletes hederae, ivy bee; Southern, generally coastal distribution
- Colletes marginatus, little colletes bee; Localised to sand dunes on coasts of England and Wales. Inland population in the Brecks.
- Colletes similis, common plasterer bee; Widespread in southern Britain and Ireland
- Colletes succinctus, heather colletes bee; Widespread throughout the Britain and Ireland on heathland and moorland

=== Genus Hylaeus: yellow-face bees ===
- Hylaeus annularis, shingle yellow-face bee; Widespread, locally common syn. Hylaeus spilotus
- Hylaeus brevicornis, short-horned yellow-face bee
- Hylaeus communis, common yellow-face bee
- Hylaeus confusus, white-jawed yellow-face bee
- Hylaeus cornutus, spined hylaeus bee
- Hylaeus dilatatus, chalk yellow-face bee
- Hylaeus hyalinatus, hairy yellow-face bee
- Hylaeus incongruus, white-lipped yellow-face bee; syn. Hylaeus gibbus
- Hylaeus pectoralis, reed yellow-face bee
- Hylaeus pictipes, little yellow-face bee
- Hylaeus punctulatissimus, onion yellow-face bee
- Hylaeus signatus, large yellow-face bee

== Family Andrenidae ==
=== Genus Andrena: mining bees ===
- Andrena agilissima, violet-winged mining bee
- Andrena angustior, groove-faced mining bee
- Andrena apicata, large sallow mining bee
- Andrena argentata, small sandpit mining bee
- Andrena barbilabris, sandpit mining bee
- Andrena bicolor, Gwynne's mining bee
- Andrena bimaculata, large gorse mining bee
- Andrena bucephala, large-headed mining bee
- Andrena chrysosceles, hawthorn mining bee
- Andrena cineraria, ashy mining bee
- Andrena clarkella, Clarke's mining bee
- Andrena coitana, small-flecked mining bee
- Andrena congruens, long-fringed mining bee
- Andrena denticulata, grey-banded mining bee
- Andrena dorsata, short-fringed mining bee
- Andrena ferox, oak mining bee
- Andrena flavipes, yellow-legged mining bee
- Andrena florea, bryony mining bee
- Andrena fucata, painted mining bee
- Andrena fulva, tawny mining bee
- Andrena fulvago, hawksbeard mining bee
- Andrena fuscipes, heather mining bee
- Andrena gravida, white-bellied mining bee
- Andrena haemorrhoa, orange-tailed mining bee
- Andrena hattorfiana, large scabious mining bee
- Andrena helvola, coppice mining bee
- Andrena humilis, catsear mining bee
- Andrena labialis, large meadow mining bee
- Andrena labiata, red-girdled mining bee
- Andrena lapponica, bilberry mining bee
- Andrena lathyri, Burbage mining bee
- Andrena lepida, Aldworth mining bee
- Andrena marginata, small scabious mining bee
- Andrena nigriceps, black-headed mining bee
- Andrena nigroaenea, buffish mining bee
- Andrena nigrospina, scarce black mining bee
- Andrena nitida, grey-patched mining bee
- Andrena nitidiuscula, carrot mining bee
- Andrena ovatula, small gorse mining bee
- Andrena pilipes, black mining bee
- Andrena polita, Maidstone mining bee
- Andrena praecox, small sallow mining bee
- Andrena proxima, broad-faced mining bee
- Andrena rosae, Perkins' mining bee
- Andrena ruficrus, northern mining bee
- Andrena scotica, chocolate mining bee
- Andrena similis, red-backed mining bee
- Andrena simillima, buff-banded mining bee
- Andrena synadelpha, broad-margined mining bee
- Andrena tarsata, tormentil mining bee
- Andrena thoracica, cliff mining bee
- Andrena tibialis, grey-gastered mining bee
- Andrena tridentata, pale-tailed mining bee
- Andrena trimmerana, Trimmer's mining bee
- Andrena vaga, Grey-backed mining bee
- Andrena varians, blackthorn mining bee
- Andrena wilkella, Wilke's mining bee

==== Subgenus Micrandrena: mini-miners ====
- Andrena alfkenella, Alfken's miniature mining bee
- Andrena falsifica, thick-margined miniature mining bee
- Andrena floricola, Chilterns miniature mining bee
- Andrena minutula, common miniature mining bee
- Andrena minutuloides, plain miniature mining bee
- Andrena nana, Barham miniature mining bee
- Andrena nanula, red-horned miniature mining bee
- Andrena niveata, long-fringed miniature mining bee
- Andrena semilaevis, shiny-margined miniature mining bee
- Andrena subopaca, impunctate miniature mining bee

=== Genus Panurgus: shaggy bees ===
- Panurgus banksianus, large shaggy bee
- Panurgus calcaratus, small shaggy bee

== Family Halictidae ==
=== Genus Halictus: end-banded furrow bees ===
- Halictus confusus, southern bronze furrow bee
- Halictus eurygnathus, downland furrow bee
- Halictus maculatus, square-headed furrow bee
- Halictus quadricinctus, giant furrow bee
- Halictus rubicundus, orange-legged furrow bee
- Halictus scabiosae, great-banded furrow bee
- Halictus subauratus, golden furrow bee
- Halictus tumulorum, bronze furrow bee

=== Genus Lasioglossum: base-banded furrow bees ===
- Lasioglossum albipes, bloomed furrow bee
- Lasioglossum angusticeps, cliff furrow bee
- Lasioglossum brevicorne, short-horned furrow bee
- Lasioglossum calceatum, common furrow bee
- Lasioglossum cupromicans, turquoise furrow bee
- Lasioglossum fratellum, smooth-faced furrow bee
- Lasioglossum fulvicorne, lime-loving furrow bee
- Lasioglossum laeve, shiny-gastered furrow bee
- Lasioglossum laevigatum, black-mouthed furrow bee
- Lasioglossum laticeps, broad-faced furrow bee
- Lasioglossum lativentre, furry-claspered furrow bee
- Lasioglossum leucopus, white-footed green furrow bee
- Lasioglossum leucozonium, white-zoned furrow bee
- Lasioglossum limbellum, ridge-gastered furrow bee
- Lasioglossum malachurum, sharp-collared furrow bee
- Lasioglossum minutissimum, least furrow bee
- Lasioglossum morio, common green furrow bee
- Lasioglossum nitidiusculum, tufted furrow bee
- Lasioglossum parvulum, smooth-gastered furrow bee
- Lasioglossum pauperatum, squat furrow bee
- Lasioglossum pauxillum, lobe-spurred furrow bee
- Lasioglossum prasinum, grey-tailed furrow bee
- Lasioglossum punctatissimum, long-faced furrow bee
- Lasioglossum puncticolle, ridge-cheeked furrow bee
- Lasioglossum quadrinotatum, four-spotted furrow bee
- Lasioglossum rufitarse, rufous-footed furrow bee
- Lasioglossum semilucens, small shiny furrow bee
- Lasioglossum sexnotatum, ashy furrow bee
- Lasioglossum smeathmanellum, Smeathman's furrow bee
- Lasioglossum villosulum, orange-footed furrow bee
- Lasioglossum xanthopus, shaggy furrow bee
- Lasioglossum zonulus, bull-headed furrow bee

=== Genus Sphecodes: blood bees ===
- Sphecodes albilabris, giant blood bee
- Sphecodes crassus, swollen-thighed blood bee
- Sphecodes ephippius, bare-saddled blood bee
- Sphecodes ferruginatus, dull-headed blood bee
- Sphecodes geoffrellus, Geoffroy's blood bee
- Sphecodes gibbus, dark-winged blood bee
- Sphecodes hyalinatus, furry-bellied blood bee
- Sphecodes longulus, little sickle-jawed blood bee
- Sphecodes marginatus, margined blood bee
- Sphecodes miniatus, false-margined blood bee
- Sphecodes monilicornis, box-headed blood bee
- Sphecodes niger, dark blood bee
- Sphecodes pellucidus, sandpit blood bee
- Sphecodes puncticeps, sickle-jawed blood bee
- Sphecodes reticulatus, reticulate blood bee
- Sphecodes rubicundus, red-tailed blood bee
- Sphecodes scabricollis, rough-backed blood bee
- Sphecodes spinulosus, spined blood bee

=== Genus Dufourea: short-faced bees ===
- Dufourea halictula, sheep's bit short-faced bee
- Dufourea minuta, shiny short-faced bee

=== Genus Rophites: bristle-headed bees ===
- Rophites quinquespinosus, five-spined bee

== Family Melittidae ==
=== Genus Dasypoda: pantaloon bees ===
- Dasypoda hirtipes, pantaloon bee

=== Genus Melitta: blunthorn bees ===
- Melitta dimidiata, sainfoin blunthorn bee
- Melitta haemorrhoidalis, bellflower blunthorn bee
- Melitta leporina, clover blunthorn bee
- Melitta tricincta, red bartsia blunthorn bee

=== Genus Macropis: loosestrife bees ===
- Macropis europaea, yellow loosestrife bee

== Family Megachilidae ==
=== Genus Anthidium: wool carder bees ===
- Anthidium manicatum, European wool carder bee

=== Genus Stelis: dark bees ===
- Stelis breviuscula, little dark bee
- Stelis ornatula, spotted dark bee
- Stelis phaeoptera, plain dark bee
- Stelis punctulatissima, banded dark bee

=== Genus Heriades: resin bees ===
- Heriades truncorum, ridge-saddled carpenter bee

=== Genus Chelostoma: scissor bees ===
- Chelostoma campanularum, small scissor bee
- Chelostoma florisomne, large scissor bee

=== Genus Osmia: mason bees ===
- Osmia aurulenta, gold-fringed mason bee
- Osmia bicolor, two-coloured mason bee
- Osmia caerulescens, blue mason bee
- Osmia inermis, mountain mason bee
- Osmia leaiana, orange-vented mason bee
- Osmia niveata, Jersey mason bee
- Osmia parietina, wall mason bee
- Osmia pilicornis, fringe-horned mason bee
- Osmia bicornis, red mason bee
- Osmia uncinata, pinewood mason bee
- Osmia xanthomelana, large mason bee

=== Genus Hoplitis: lesser mason bees ===
- Hoplitis claviventris, welted lesser mason bee
- Hoplitis leucomelana, black and white lesser mason bee
- Hoplitis spinulosa, spined mason bee syn. Osmia spinulosa

=== Genus Megachile: leaf-cutter bees ===
- Megachile centuncularis, patchwork leaf-cutter bee
- Megachile circumcincta, black-headed leaf-cutter bee
- Megachile dorsalis, silvery leaf-cutter bee
- Megachile lapponica, willowherb leaf-cutter bee
- Megachile ligniseca, wood-carving leaf-cutter bee
- Megachile maritima, coastal leaf-cutter bee
- Megachile versicolor, brown-footed leaf-cutter bee
- Megachile willughbiella, Willughby's leaf-cutter bee

=== Genus Coelioxys: sharp-tailed bees ===
- Coelioxys afra, short sharp-tailed bee
- Coelioxys brevis, narrow-bodied sharp-tailed bee
- Coelioxys conoidea, large sharp-tailed bee
- Coelioxys elongata, dull-vented sharp-tailed bee
- Coelioxys inermis, shiny-vented sharp-tailed bee
- Coelioxys mandibularis, small leaf-cutter cuckoo bee
- Coelioxys quadridentata, four-toothed sharp-tailed bee
- Coelioxys rufescens, rufescent sharp-tailed bee

== Family Apidae ==
=== Genus Nomada: nomad bees ===
- Nomada alboguttata, large bear-clawed nomad bee
- Nomada argentata, silver-sided nomad bee
- Nomada armata, armed nomad bee
- Nomada baccata, bear-clawed nomad bee
- Nomada bifasciata, dusky-horned nomad bee
- Nomada castellana, Castell's nomad bee
- Nomada conjungens, fringeless nomad bee
- Nomada errans, Purbeck nomad bee
- Nomada fabriciana, Fabricus' nomad bee
- Nomada ferruginata, yellow-shouldered nomad bee
- Nomada flava, flavous yellow nomad bee
- Nomada flavoguttata, small nomad bee
- Nomada flavopicta, blunthorn nomad bee
- Nomada fucata, painted nomad bee
- Nomada fulvicornis, orange-horned nomad bee
- Nomada fuscicornis, small Guernsey nomad bee
- Nomada glabella, bilberry nomad bee
- Nomada goodeniana, Gooden's nomad bee
- Nomada guttulata, short-spined nomad bee
- Nomada hirtipes, long-horned nomad bee
- Nomada integra, catsear nomad bee
- Nomada lathburiana, lathbury's nomad bee
- Nomada leucophthalma, early nomad bee
- Nomada marshamella, Marsham's nomad bee
- Nomada obtusifrons, flat-ridged nomad bee
- Nomada panzeri, Panzer's nomad bee
- Nomada roberjeotiana, tormentil nomad bee
- Nomada ruficornis, fork-jawed nomad bee
- Nomada rufipes, black-horned nomad bee
- Nomada sexfasciata, six-banded nomad bee
- Nomada sheppardana, Sheppard's nomad bee
- Nomada signata, broad-banded nomad bee
- Nomada similis, Guernsey nomad bee
- Nomada striata, blunt-jawed nomad bee
- Nomada subcornuta, Kirby's nomad bee
- Nomada succincta, yellow-legged nomad bee
- Nomada zonata, variable nomad bee

=== Genus Epeolus: cuckoo mining bees ===
- Epeolus cruciger, red thighed cuckoo mining bee
- Epeolus variegatus, variegated cuckoo mining bee

=== Genus Eucera: long-horned bees ===
- Eucera longicornis, long-horned bee
- Eucera nigrescens, early long-horned bee

=== Genus Anthophora: flower bees ===
- Anthophora bimaculata, green-eyed flower bee
- Anthophora furcata, fork-tailed flower bee
- Anthophora plumipes, hairy-footed flower bee
- Anthophora quadrimaculata, four-banded flower bee
- Anthophora retusa, potter flower bee

=== Genus Melecta: mourning bees ===
- Melecta albifrons, mourning bee
- Melecta luctuosa, square-spotted mourning bee

=== Genus Ceratina: small carpenter bees ===
- Ceratina cyanea, blue carpenter bee

=== Genus Xylocopa: large carpenter bees ===
- Xylocopa violacea, violet carpenter bee

=== Genus Bombus: bumblebees ===
==== Subgenus Bombus: white-tailed bumblebees ====
- Bombus cryptarum, cryptic bumblebee
- Bombus lucorum, white-tailed bumblebee
- Bombus magnus, northern white-tailed bumblebee
- Bombus terrestris, buff-tailed bumblebee

==== Subgenus Kallobombus: broken-belted bumblebee ====
- Bombus soroeensis, broken-belted bumblebee

==== Subgenus Megabombus: greater bumblebees ====
- Bombus hortorum, garden bumblebee
- Bombus ruderatus, large garden bumblebee

==== Subgenus Melanobombus: black-bodied bumblebees ====
- Bombus lapidarius, red-tailed bumblebee

==== Subgenus Psithyrus: cuckoo bumblebees ====
- Bombus barbutellus, Barbut's cuckoo-bee
- Bombus bohemicus, gypsy cuckoo-bee
- Bombus campestris, field cuckoo-bee
- Bombus rupestris, red-tailed cuckoo-bee
- Bombus sylvestris, forest cuckoo-bee
- Bombus vestalis, vestal cuckoo-bee

==== Subgenus Pyrobombus: fiery-tailed bumblebees ====
- Bombus hypnorum, tree bumblebee
- Bombus jonellus, heath bumblebee
- Bombus monticola, bilberry bumblebee
- Bombus pratorum, early bumblebee

==== Subgenus Subterraneobombus: yellow bumblebee ====
- Bombus distinguendus, great yellow bumblebee

==== Subgenus Thoracombus: carder bees ====
- Bombus humilis, brown-banded carder bee
- Bombus muscorum, moss carder bee
- Bombus pascuorum, common carder bee
- Bombus ruderarius, red-shanked carder bee
- Bombus sylvarum, shrill carder bee

=== Genus Apis: honeybees ===
- Apis mellifera, western honey bee
  - Apis mellifera mellifera, European dark bee
