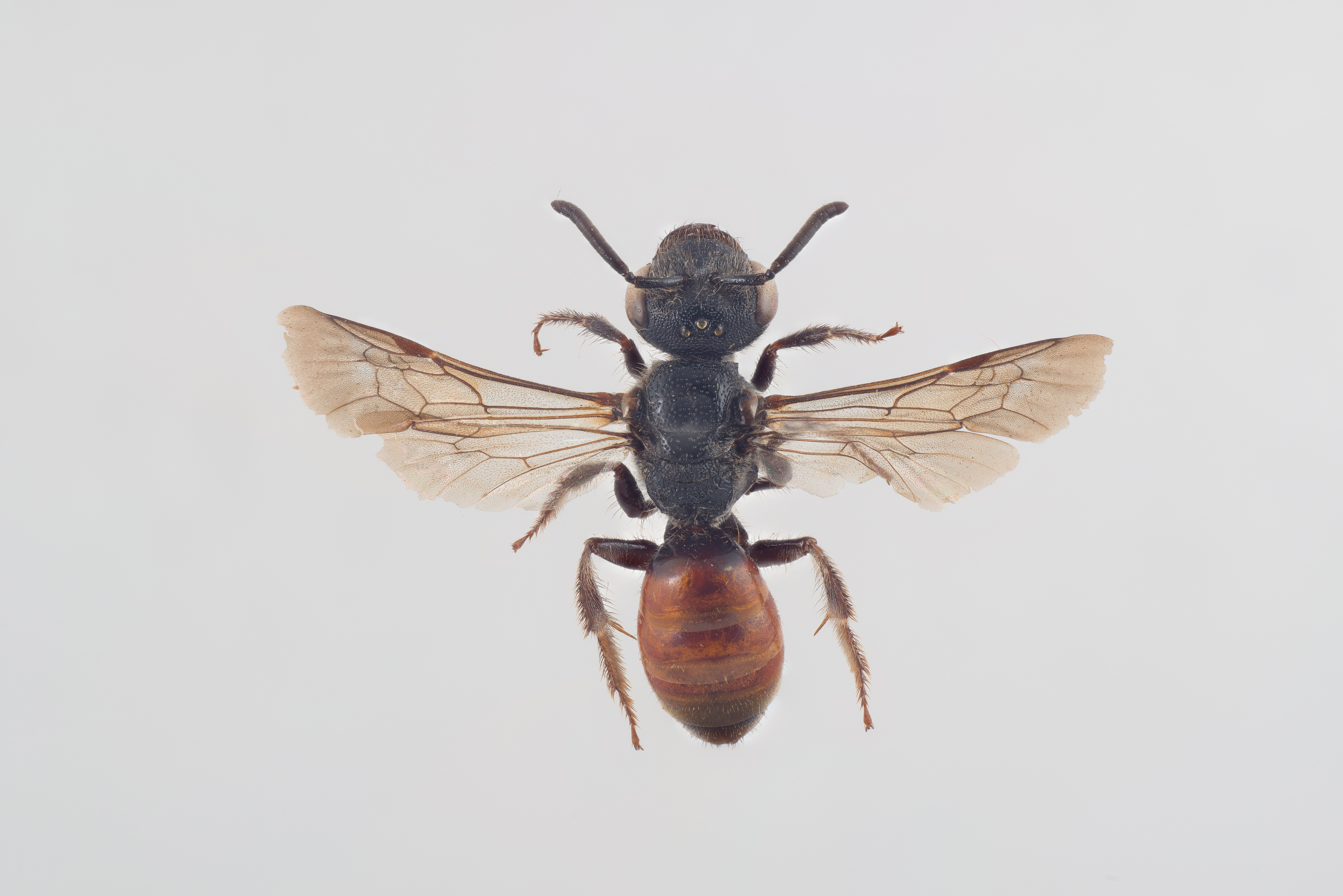

Scientific classification
- Kingdom: Animalia
- Phylum: Arthropoda
- Class: Insecta
- Order: Hymenoptera
- Family: Halictidae
- Genus: Sphecodes
- Species: S. gibbus

Binomial name
- Sphecodes gibbus (Linnaeus, 1758)

Synonyms
- Sphex gibba Linnaeus, 1758; Apis glabra Füessly, 1775; Andrena ferruginea Olivier, 1789; Apis gibbosa Christ, 1791; Melitta picea Kirby, 1802; Melitta sphecoides Kirby, 1802; Andrena austriaca Fabricius, 1804; Dichroa analis Illiger, 1806; Sphecodes apicatus Smith, 1853; Sphecodes nigripennis Morawitz, 1876; Sphecodes sutor Nurse, 1903; Sphecodes nippon Meyer, 1922; Sphecodes castilianus Blüthgen, 1924; Sphecodes lustrans Cockerell, 1931; Sphecodes pergibbus Blüthgen, 1938

= Sphecodes gibbus =

Species of bee

Sphecodes gibbus, the dark-winged blood bee, is a species of cleptoparasitic blood bee from the Palearctic. It is the type species of the genus Sphecodes and was first described by Carl Linnaeus as Sphex gibba in 1758.

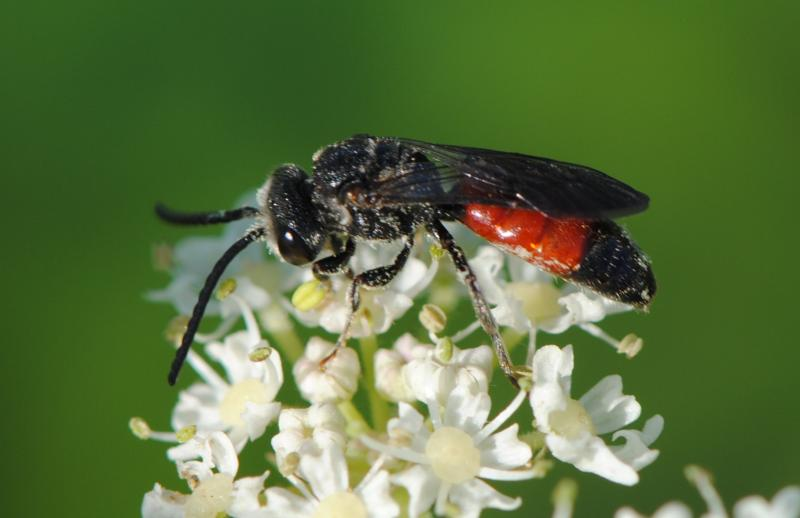
Sphecodes gibbus

== Description ==
Sphecodes gibbus is a relatively large Sphecodes species with a body length of around 10mm. Like other blood bees they are mainly black and red in colour. S. gibbus is one in three species of similar sized blood bees in which the females have punctures, instead of merely rugosity, to the posterior of the ocelli. The female S. gibbus may be separated from the similar S. monilicornis by its wider, less square shaped head, the darker pubescence on the hind tibiae and thinner propodeum. The broader zone of punctures to the rear of the ocelli allow separation from S. reticulatus, S. gibbus having 5-6 irregular rows of punctures rather than the 2-3 shown by S. reticulatus, as well as possessing sparser punctures at the base of the fourth tergite. The wings of female S. gibbus also tend to be darker in color than those in other blood bees and tergites 1 and 3 are often partly darkened. The males are the only male Sphecodes with abundant punctures located in rows at the back of the ocelli, their genitalia are also distinctive.

== Distribution ==
Sphecodes gibbus is found throughout the Palearctic, although it is known from only two sites in Ireland. In Europe it extends north to 63° N and its range extends into North Africa, and east into China and Mongolia.

== Habitat ==
Sphecodes gibbus uses the same habitat as its host species and is often seen flying over bare ground as it searches for the nests of its host bees. It does prefer warmer open areas with bushes, especially in the more northerly parts of its range.

== Biology ==
Female Sphecodes gibbus can be found between April and September; early season females search for nests of their host species to parasitise, while late season females search for mates and subsequently for an overwintering site. The males are in flight from July to September. The females are cleptoparasites on larger bees of the genera Halictus and Lasioglossum, entering the hosts' nests when the cells are completed, consuming the host egg and laying its own, with the new generation emerging in late summer to mate and overwinter. It has been confirmed as using Halictus quadricinctus, H. rubicundus, H. sexcintus, H. simplex and H. maculatus as hosts, while it is also likely to parasitise Lasioglossum malachurum. The principal host in England and Belgium is H. rubicundus. Other species have been claimed but not confirmed, including Andrena vaga and Colletes cunicularius both of which are regarded as unlikely hosts. However, with such a wide distribution a number of host species may be used. The adults feed only on nectar, and seem to show a preference for flowers of the families Asteraceae and Apiaceae.
