= Sphecodes schenckii =

Conservation status
- Near Threatened (IUCN 3.1)

Scientific classification
- Kingdom: Animalia
- Phylum: Arthropoda
- Clade: Pancrustacea
- Class: Insecta
- Order: Hymenoptera
- Family: Halictidae
- Genus: Sphecodes
- Species: S. schenckii

Binomial name
- Sphecodes schenckii Hagens, 1882

Synonyms
- Sphecodes sulcicollis Perez, 1903

Species of bee

Sphecodes schenckii is a solitary cleptoparasitic bee which is found in southern and eastern Europe and the Middle East. Its host is Lasioglossum discum and possibly Halictus simplex where L. discum does not occur such as in southern Germany and Switzerland. It is rare and there are only a few records from each country from which it has been recorded. It prefers warm open areas, such as grasslands and Mediterranean scrub, and may be threatened by reafforestation and vegetation succession. The specific name schenckii is in honour of the German hymenopterist Adolph Schenck.
