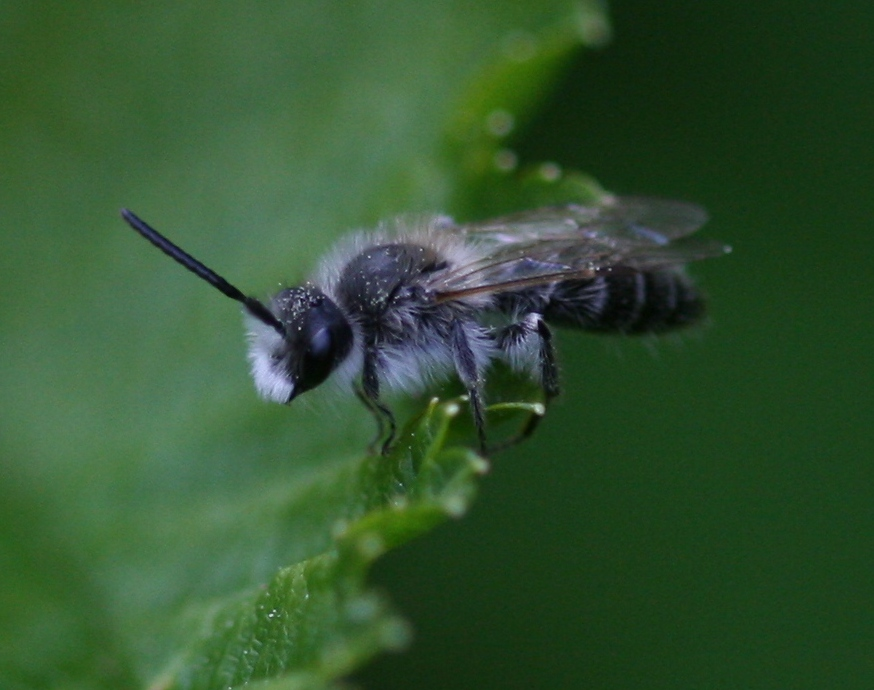

Conservation status
- Least Concern (IUCN 3.1)

Scientific classification
- Kingdom: Animalia
- Phylum: Arthropoda
- Class: Insecta
- Order: Hymenoptera
- Family: Andrenidae
- Genus: Andrena
- Species: A. barbilabris

Binomial name
- Andrena barbilabris (Kirby, 1802)

Synonyms
- List: Apis sericea Christ, 1791; Melitta barbilabris Kirby, 1802; Melitta albicrus Kirby, 1802; Andrena albo-cincta Zetterstedt, 1838; Andrena albocincta Zetterstedt, 1838; Andrena barbatula Zetterstedt, 1838; Andrena parumpunctata Schenck, 1853; Andrena placida Smith, 1853; Andrena angustipes Schenck, 1866; Andrena ciliate Schenck, 1870; Andrena macilenta Provancher, 1888; Andrena macgillivrayi Cockerell, 1897; Andrena salicacea Robertson, 1900; Andrena sapellonis Cockerell, 1900; Andrena pauperata Pérez, 1902; Andrena ciliatula Viereck, 1916; Andrena (Euandrena) taisetsusana Tadauchi and Hirashima, 1987; Andrena (Andrena) dolharubang Tadauchi and Xu, 1997

= Andrena barbilabris =

Species of bee

Andrena barbilabris, the bearded miner bee, is a species of miner bee in the family Andrenidae. It is found in Europe and Northern Asia (excluding China) and North America.

== Description ==
The bearded miner bee is commonly around 11 mm in length, the males being smaller and slenderer than the females. The females have rufous hairs on the dorsal surface of the thorax which contrast with the yellower hairs on its sides and head. The males can appear silvery in colour because of the long pale hairs on their thorax. The integument is largely black. It has a narrow head which gives this species a rather hunch-backed appearance.

== Distribution ==
The bearded miner bee has a Holarctic distribution, being found across North America in southern Canada and the northern United States. In Eurasia it is distributed from western Europe to Anatolia, into western and eastern Siberia to the Russian Far East in Yakutia and Primorsky Krai and in Japan. In Britain and Ireland it has a patchy, localised distribution as far north as Inverness, it is scarcer in Ireland. It also occurs on Guernsey and Jersey in the Channel Islands.

== Habitat and ecology ==
The bearded miner bee has a strong association with light, sandy soils. The male and female bees emerge from their underground cells in the early Spring. Following emergence they mate and the females then search out sites to excavate their nesting burrows. In the burrow, the females dig out small cells within which they place a ball of pollen mixed with nectar. She then lays a single egg on each ball and seals it into its cell. The nest is not obvious and the female relies on her sense of scent to locate the nest. The nest is hidden under a thin layer of sand and the bee digs into the nest in a short time. The flight period of these bees is from March to July and they forage on a wide variety of flowers. Willows are their preferred plant for foraging on and they usually remain within 300m of their nests. These "solitary" bees form small aggregations of nests in loose sandy soil, even nesting between paving stones in gardens. Unlike other bees in the genus Andrena, the presence of the specialized cleptoparasitic bee from the genus Sphecodes, namely Sphecodes pellucidus often alerts the observer to the presence of its host as it digs into the sand, seeking out the nests of the Bearded Miner Bees.

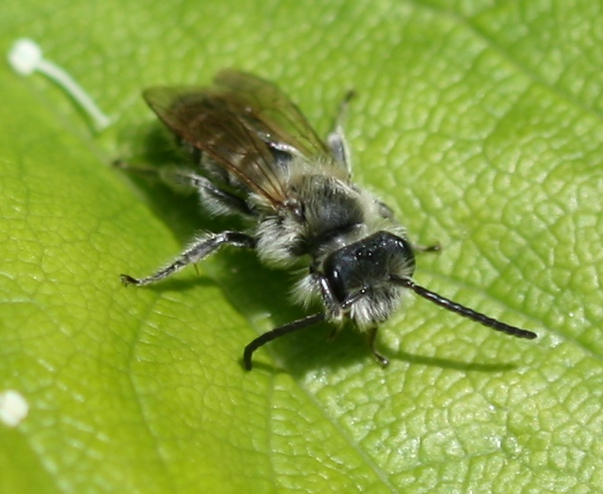
Andrena barbilabris

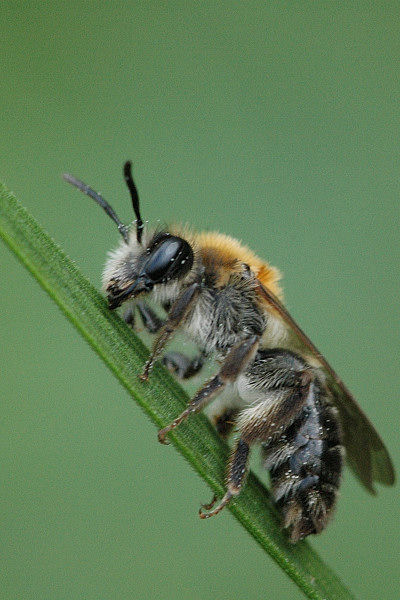
Andrena barbilabris
