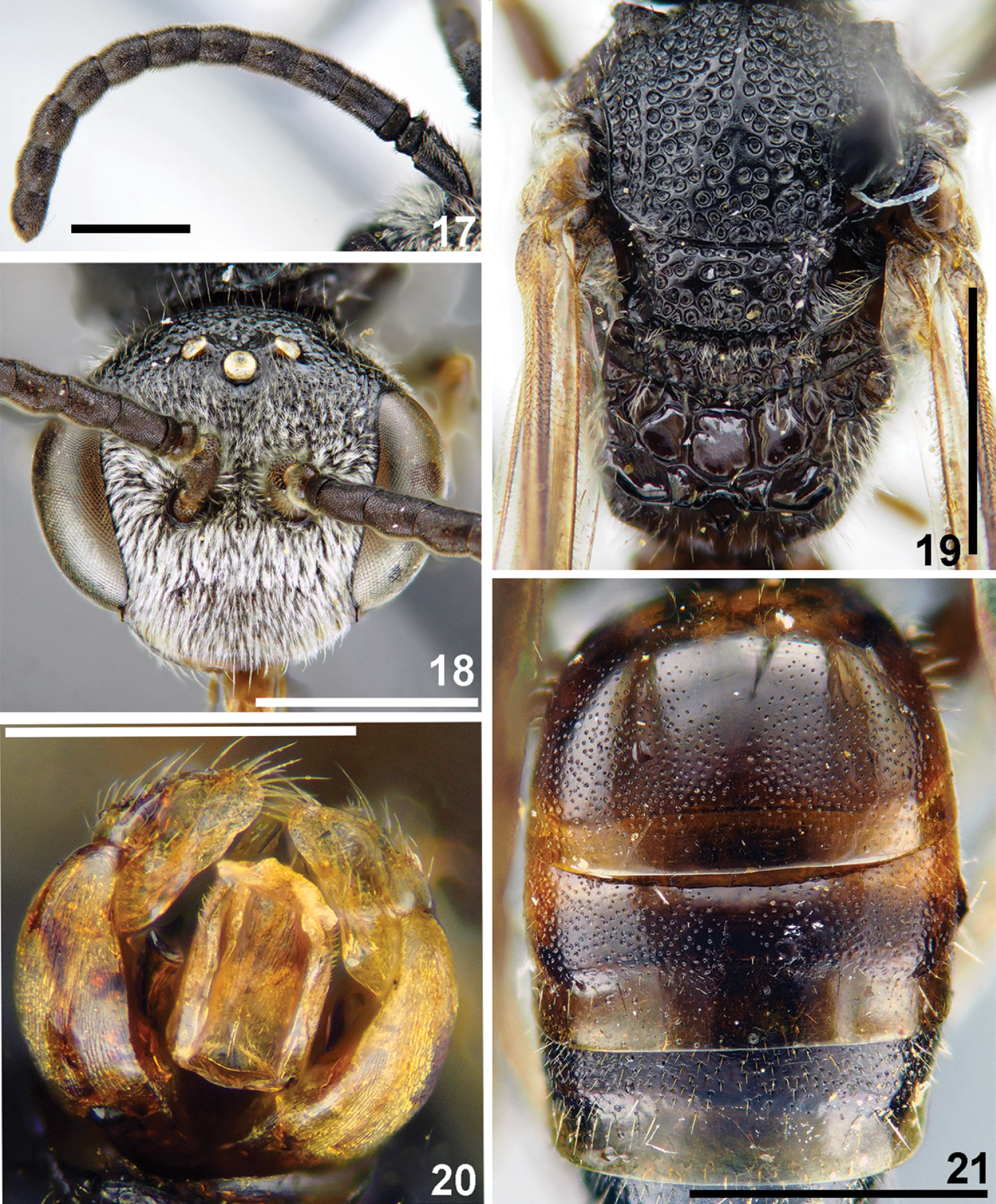

Scientific classification
- Kingdom: Animalia
- Phylum: Arthropoda
- Class: Insecta
- Order: Hymenoptera
- Family: Halictidae
- Genus: Sphecodes
- Species: S. biroi

Binomial name
- Sphecodes biroi Friese, 1909

Synonyms
- Sphecodes amboinensis Meyer, 1925; Sphecodes biroi mariae Cockerell, 1930, status uncertain

= Sphecodes biroi =

Species of bee

Sphecodes biroi is a species of bee in the genus Sphecodes, of the family Halictidae.
