= Sphecodes decorus =

Scientific classification
- Domain: Eukaryota
- Kingdom: Animalia
- Phylum: Arthropoda
- Class: Insecta
- Order: Hymenoptera
- Family: Halictidae
- Genus: Sphecodes
- Species: S. decorus

Binomial name
- Sphecodes decorus (Cameron, 1897)

Synonyms
- Halictus decorus Cameron, 1897; Halictus cameronii Bingham, 1897

Species of bee

Sphecodes decorus is a species of bee in the genus Sphecodes, of the family Halictidae. S. decorus has been documented in India and Sri Lanka.
