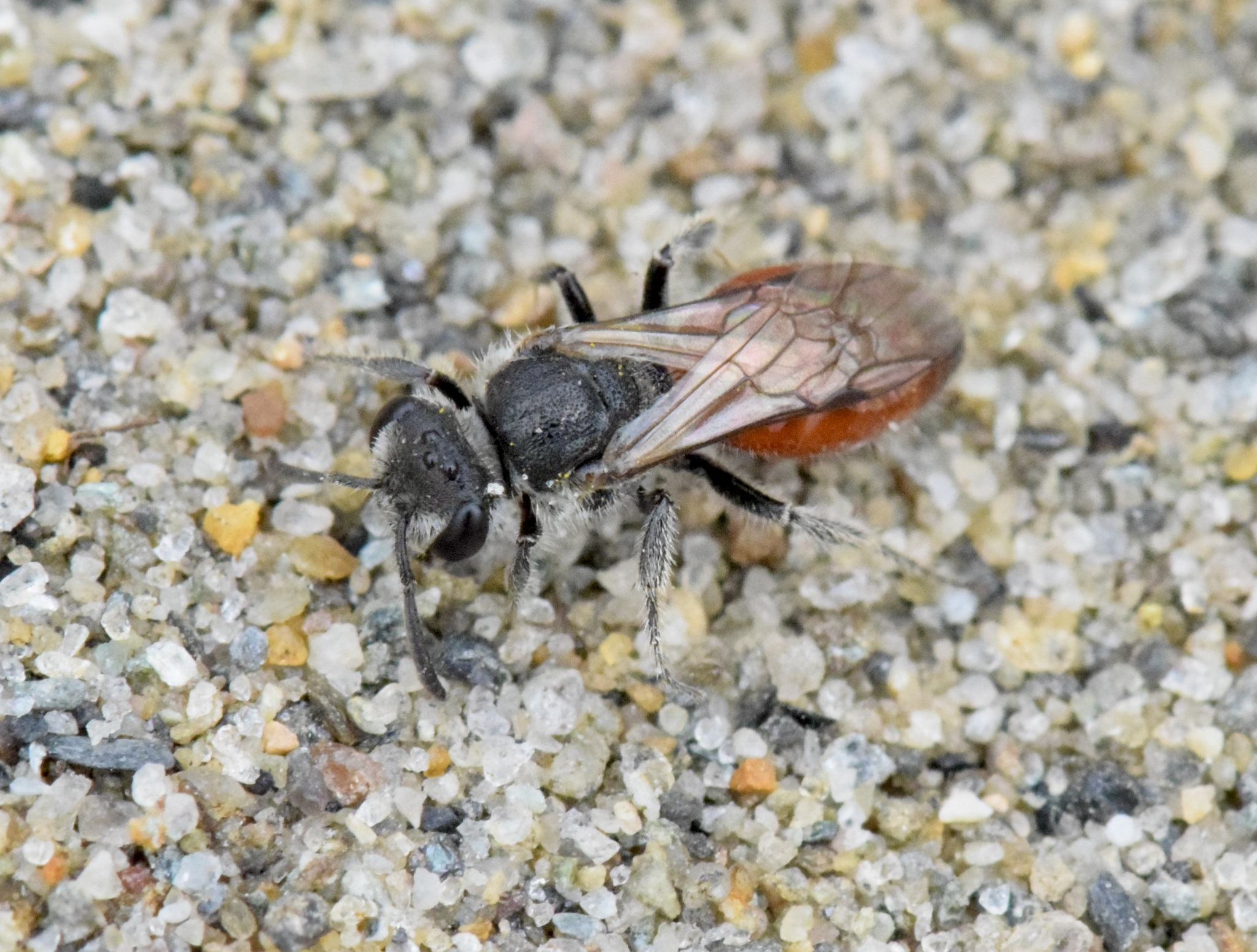

Scientific classification
- Kingdom: Animalia
- Phylum: Arthropoda
- Class: Insecta
- Order: Hymenoptera
- Family: Halictidae
- Genus: Sphecodes
- Species: S. confertus

Binomial name
- Sphecodes confertus Say, 1837

= Sphecodes confertus =

Species of bee

Sphecodes confertus is a species of sweat bee in the family Halictidae.
