= Sphecodes solonis =

Scientific classification
- Domain: Eukaryota
- Kingdom: Animalia
- Phylum: Arthropoda
- Class: Insecta
- Order: Hymenoptera
- Family: Halictidae
- Subfamily: Halictinae
- Genus: Sphecodes
- Species: S. solonis

Binomial name
- Sphecodes solonis Graenicher, 1911

Species of bee

Sphecodes solonis is a species of sweat bee in the family Halictidae.
