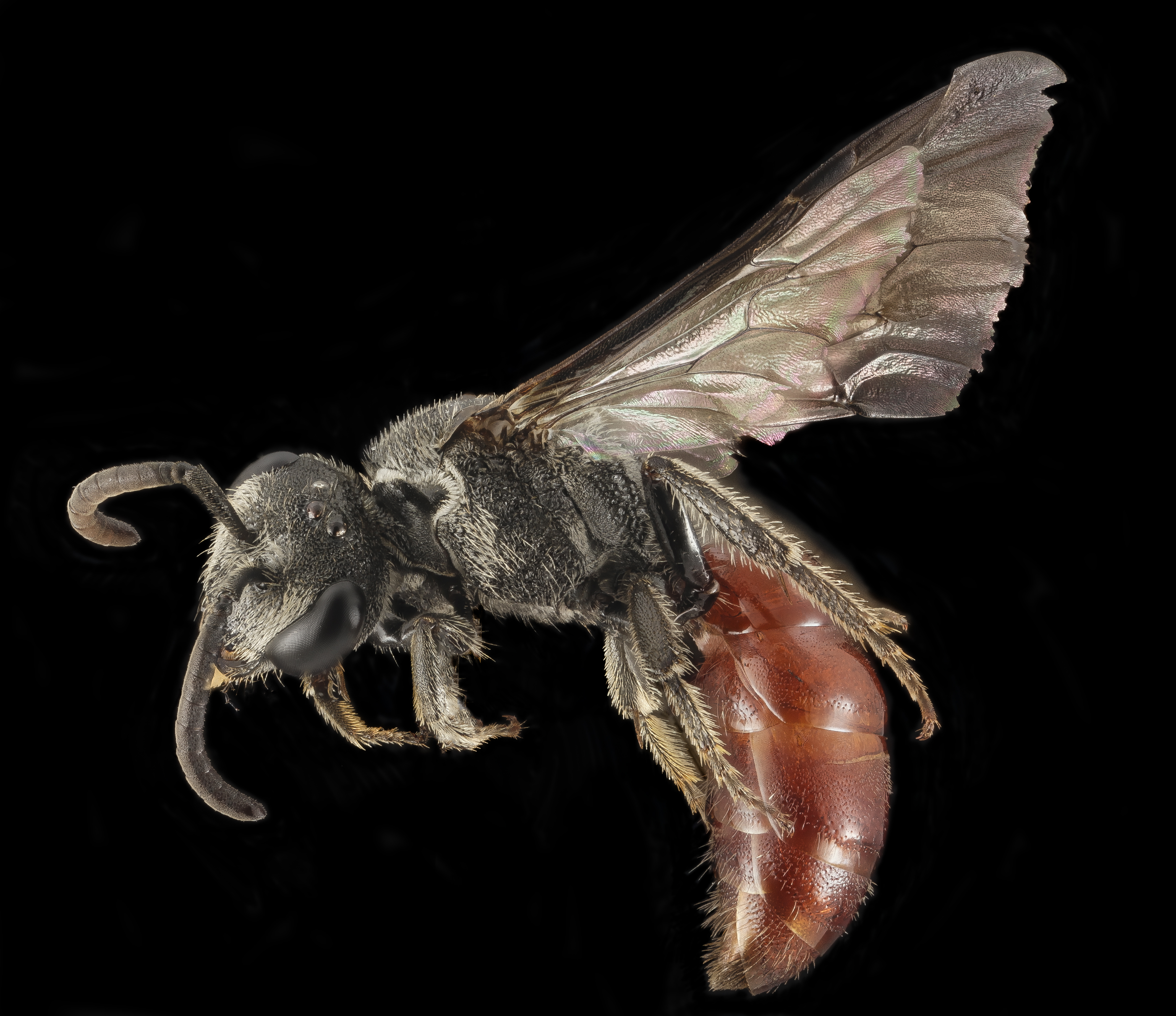

Scientific classification
- Domain: Eukaryota
- Kingdom: Animalia
- Phylum: Arthropoda
- Class: Insecta
- Order: Hymenoptera
- Family: Halictidae
- Subfamily: Halictinae
- Genus: Sphecodes
- Species: S. ranunculi

Binomial name
- Sphecodes ranunculi Robertson, 1897

= Sphecodes ranunculi =

Species of bee

Sphecodes ranunculi is a species of sweat bee in the family Halictidae.
