= Sphecodes mandibularis =

Scientific classification
- Domain: Eukaryota
- Kingdom: Animalia
- Phylum: Arthropoda
- Class: Insecta
- Order: Hymenoptera
- Family: Halictidae
- Genus: Sphecodes
- Species: S. mandibularis

Binomial name
- Sphecodes mandibularis Cresson, 1872

Species of bee

Sphecodes mandibularis is a species of sweat bee in the family Halictidae.
