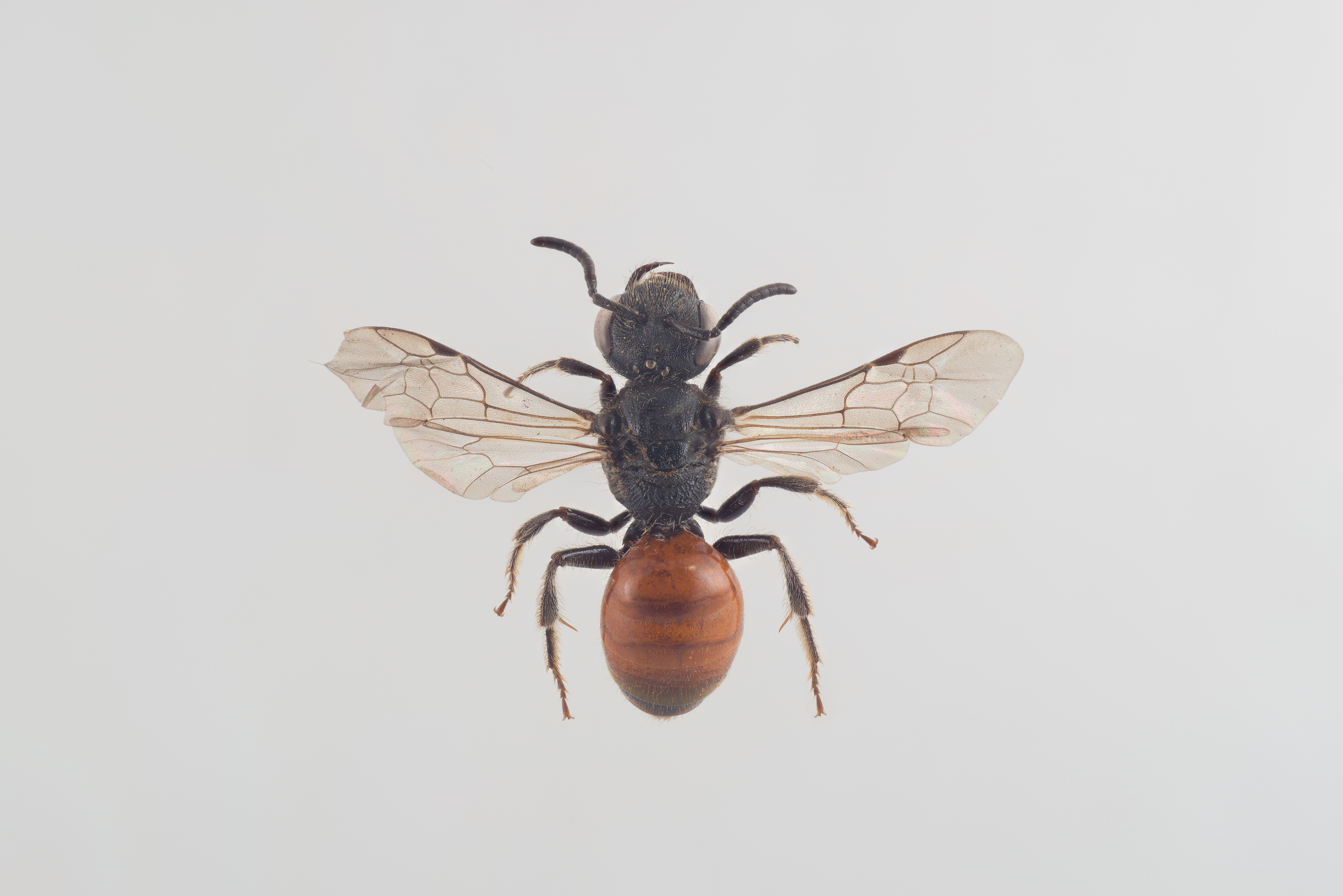
- Sphecodes ferruginatus Norway

Scientific classification
- Kingdom: Animalia
- Phylum: Arthropoda
- Clade: Pancrustacea
- Class: Insecta
- Order: Hymenoptera
- Family: Halictidae
- Subfamily: Halictinae
- Tribe: Halictini
- Genus: Sphecodes
- Species: S. ferruginatus

Binomial name
- Sphecodes ferruginatus von Hagens, 1882

= Sphecodes ferruginatus =

Species of bee

Sphecodes ferruginatus is a Palearctic species of sweat bee.
