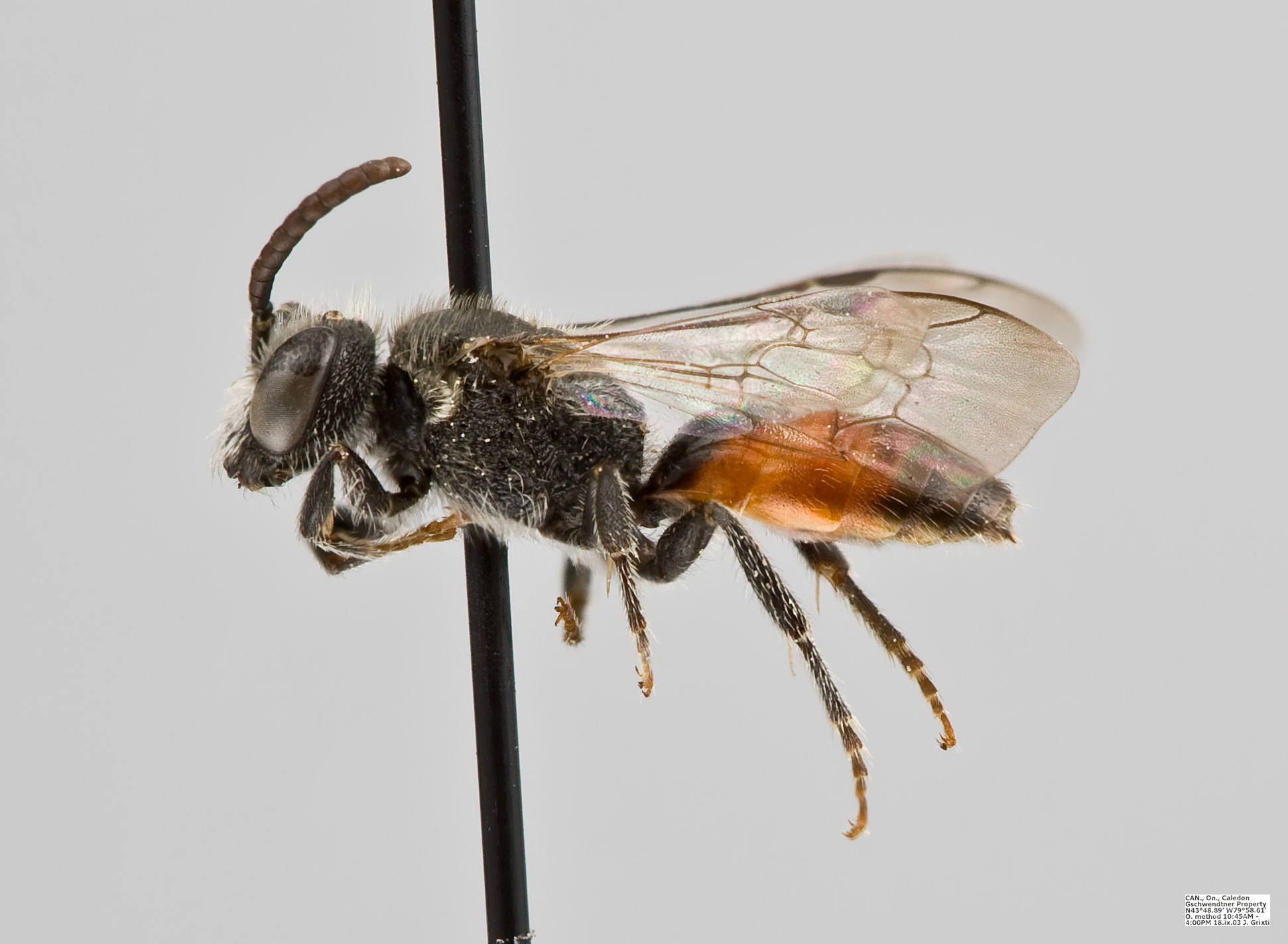

Scientific classification
- Domain: Eukaryota
- Kingdom: Animalia
- Phylum: Arthropoda
- Class: Insecta
- Order: Hymenoptera
- Family: Halictidae
- Genus: Sphecodes
- Species: S. davisii

Binomial name
- Sphecodes davisii Robertson, 1897

= Sphecodes davisii =

Species of bee

Sphecodes davisii is a species of sweat bee in the family Halictidae.
