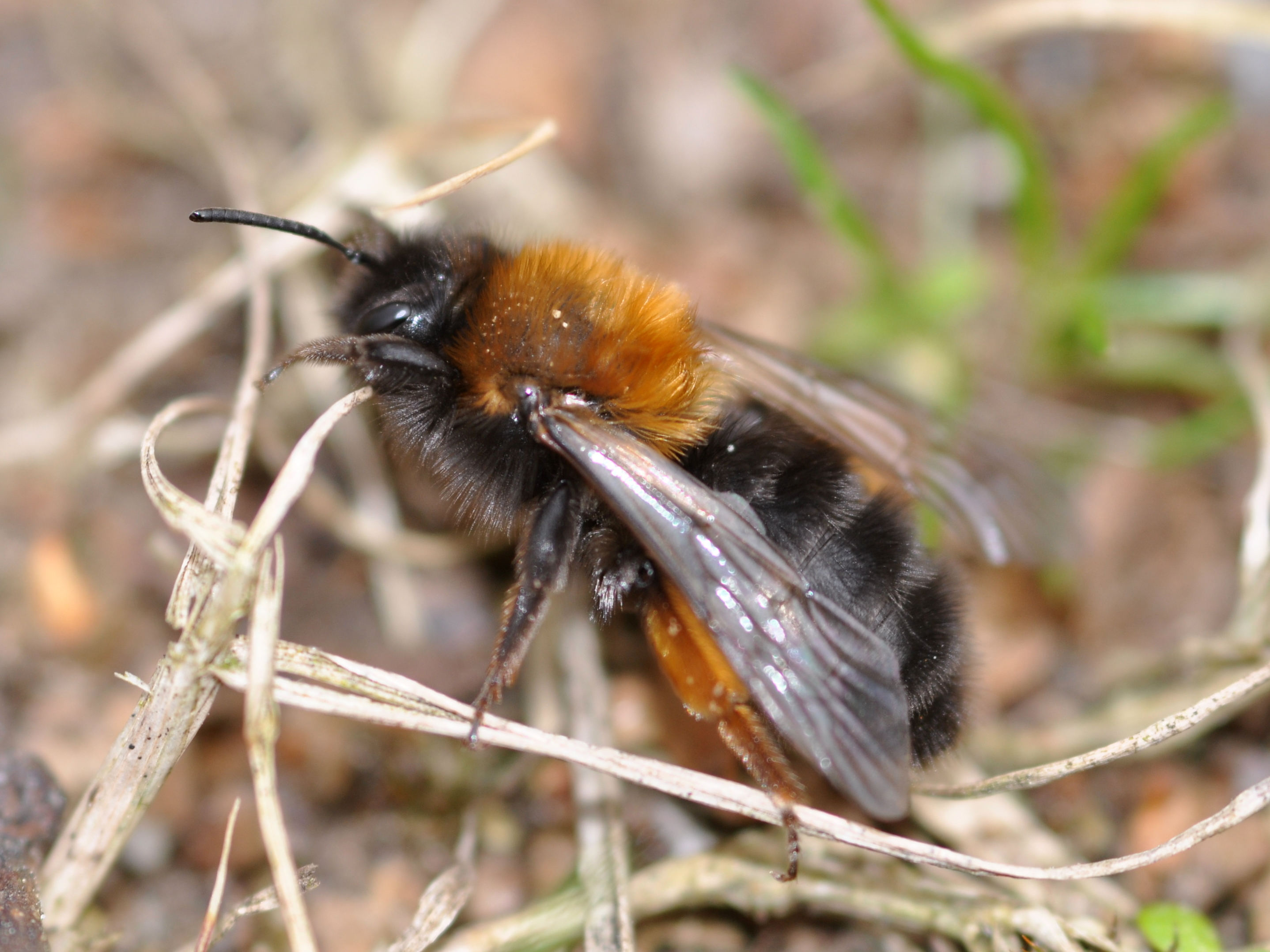

Scientific classification
- Kingdom: Animalia
- Phylum: Arthropoda
- Clade: Pancrustacea
- Class: Insecta
- Order: Hymenoptera
- Family: Andrenidae
- Genus: Andrena
- Species: A. clarkella

Binomial name
- Andrena clarkella (Kirby, 1802)

= Andrena clarkella =

Species of bee

The Clark's miner bee (Andrena clarkella) is a species of miner bee in the family Andrenidae. Other common names include Clark's andrena and Clarke's mining bee. It is found in Europe and Northern Asia (excluding China) and North America.

Etymology: William Kirby named the species in honor of Bracy Clark, an English entomologist.

Identification: 10-13 mm. Male with brown hair with loose tergite bands. Rarely on flowers, more on tree bark basking. Female easy to determine in the field: very densely hairy, with black hairs on the abdomen and reddish brown hair on the mesonotum. Hind legs fox red with equally colored rail brush. Small specimens resemble Andrena bicolor. Terminal fringe dark brown.

Pollen sources: Oligolectic on willows (Salix, Salicaceae).

Nest building: Bare to sparsely overgrown areas in sparse forests Forest fringes or clearings, preferably in sandy soil, but also nests in humus soils, mostly in smaller aggregations with low nest density. The nest entrance is locked before each food supply flight. One to four brood cells are created per nest, often only 5 cm, a maximum of 30 cm below the surface.

Habitat: Affinity to forests; forest fringes, forest clearings, clear cuts, preferred on sandy soil. From the lowlands to the subalpine altitude.

Parasites: cuckoo bee is Nomada leucophthalma. As another nest parasite Bombylius major was observed. Adults are sometimes infested with Stylops melittae.

Flight period: In one generation from early March to mid-May.

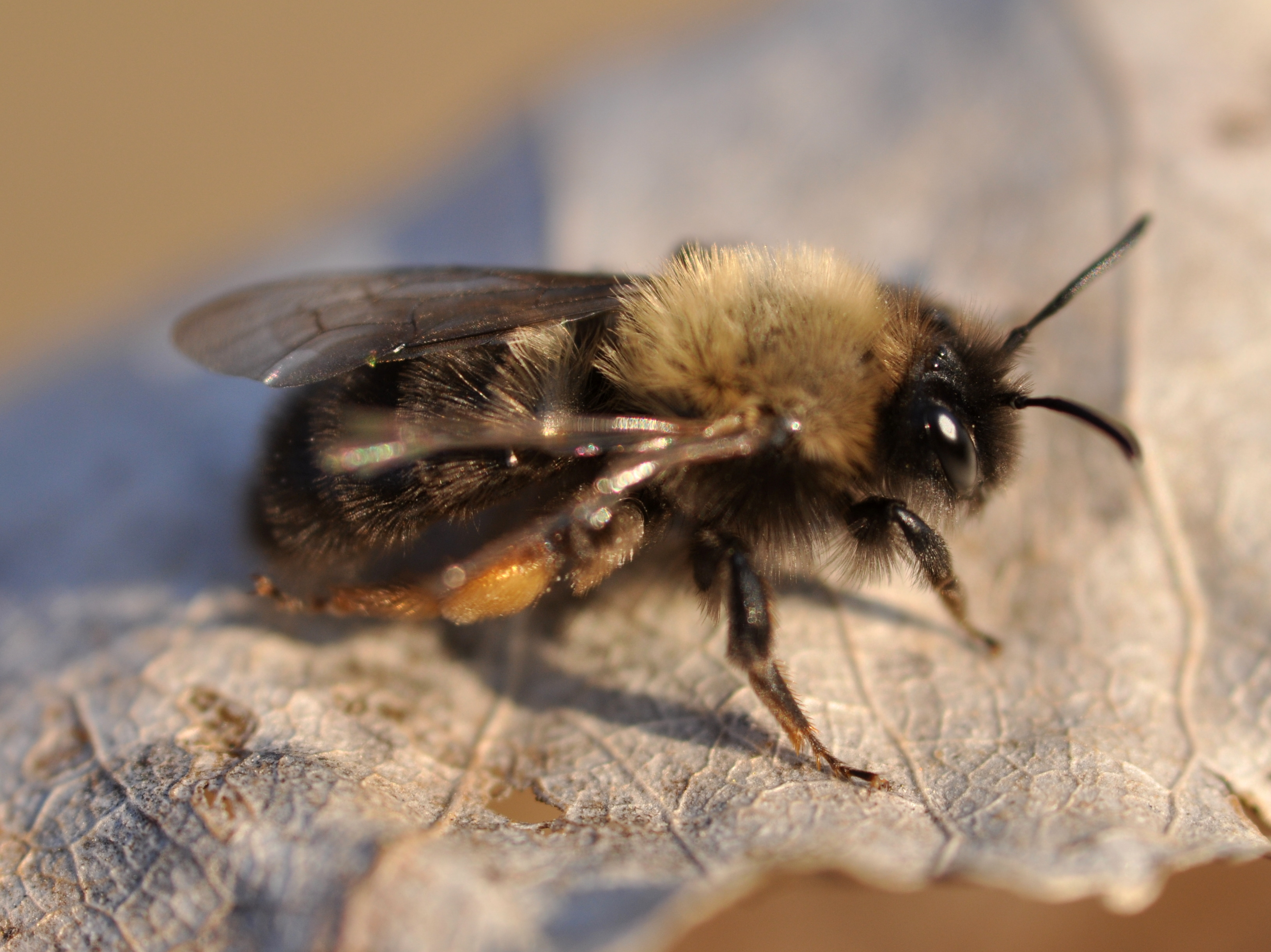
Clark's andrena, Andrena clarkella
