= Sphecodes heraclei =

Scientific classification
- Domain: Eukaryota
- Kingdom: Animalia
- Phylum: Arthropoda
- Class: Insecta
- Order: Hymenoptera
- Family: Halictidae
- Subfamily: Halictinae
- Genus: Sphecodes
- Species: S. heraclei

Binomial name
- Sphecodes heraclei Robertson, 1897

Species of bee

Sphecodes heraclei is a species of sweat bee in the family Halictidae.

== Subspecies ==
These two subspecies belong to the species Sphecodes heraclei:

- Sphecodes heraclei heraclei
- Sphecodes heraclei ignitus
