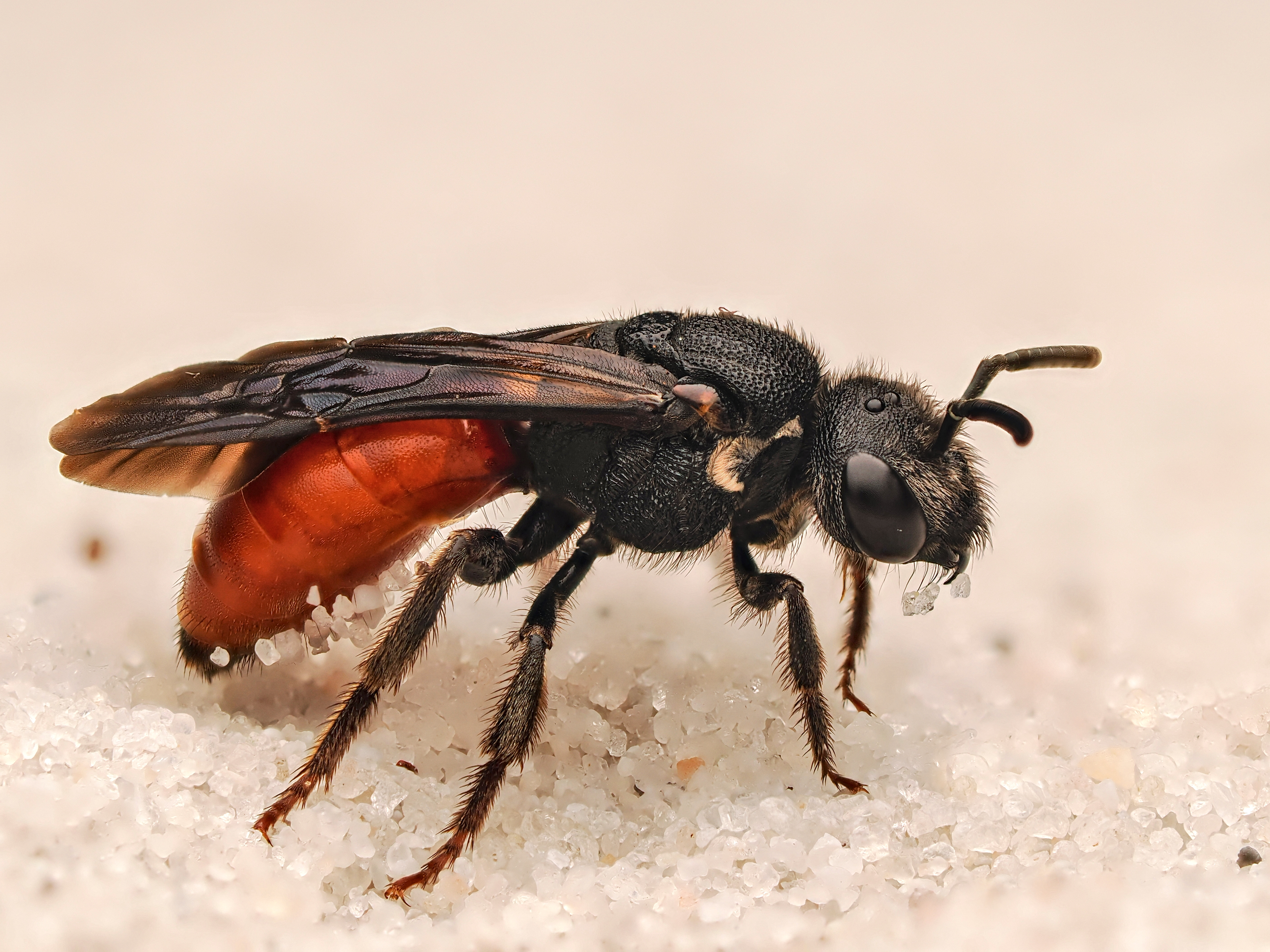

Scientific classification
- Kingdom: Animalia
- Phylum: Arthropoda
- Clade: Pancrustacea
- Class: Insecta
- Order: Hymenoptera
- Family: Halictidae
- Genus: Sphecodes
- Species: S. albilabris

Binomial name
- Sphecodes albilabris Fabricius, 1793

= Sphecodes albilabris =

Species of insect

Sphecodes albilabris is a solitary parasitic bee that is endemic to Central and Western Europe. It also occurs in North Africa and is thought to have been introduced to the United States and Australia by accident.

== Description ==
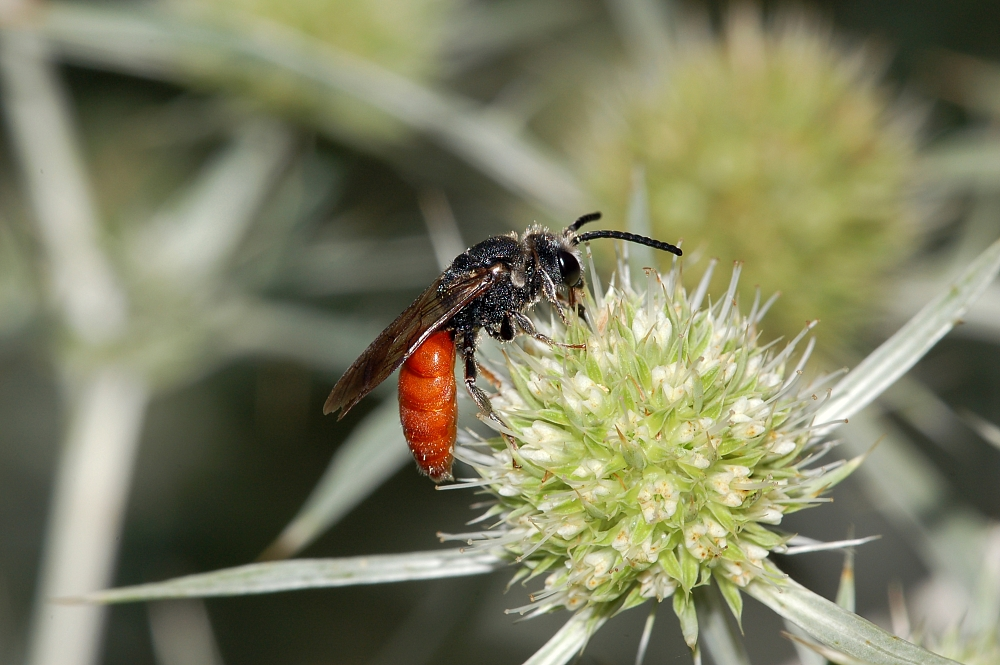

The length of the bee is 11–14 mm.

== Range ==
This species shows a transpalaearctic distribution. It occurs in North Africa from Morocco to Egypt. In Eurasia it occurs from Portugal via Europe, Asia Minor, Levant, Caucasus, Central Asia and Siberia to the Pacific coast of the Far East, reaches the oriental fauna region in northwest India (Uttar Pradesh); north to 60 ° N in Norway (Hønefoss), 62.5 ° N in Sweden (Västernorrland), 63.5 ° N in Finland (North Karelia), in Russia to Karelia and Kirov; south to Sicily, Crete, Cyprus and Israel. The ssp. rubripes SPINOLA, 1838 occurs in North Africa, Levante, Iberia including the Balearic Islands, Sardinia and Cyprus.

== Habitat ==
Inland dunes, drifting sand fields, sand pits, grasslands, flood dams, mainly in sand but also loess areas. From the lowlands to the montane elevation.

== Ecology ==
It flies from March to October. Females are flying from March to August, males from July to October.

The larvae of this species are parasites of Colletes cunicularius. The species was also observed in the nests of Halictus sexcinctus, Halictus quadricinctus and Melitturga clavicornis.

== Etymology ==
From Latin "albus" = "white" and "labrum" = "lip"; because of the snow-white hairy lower half of the face of the male.

== Taxonomy ==
Synonyms: Sphecodes fuscipennis (GERMAR, 1819)
