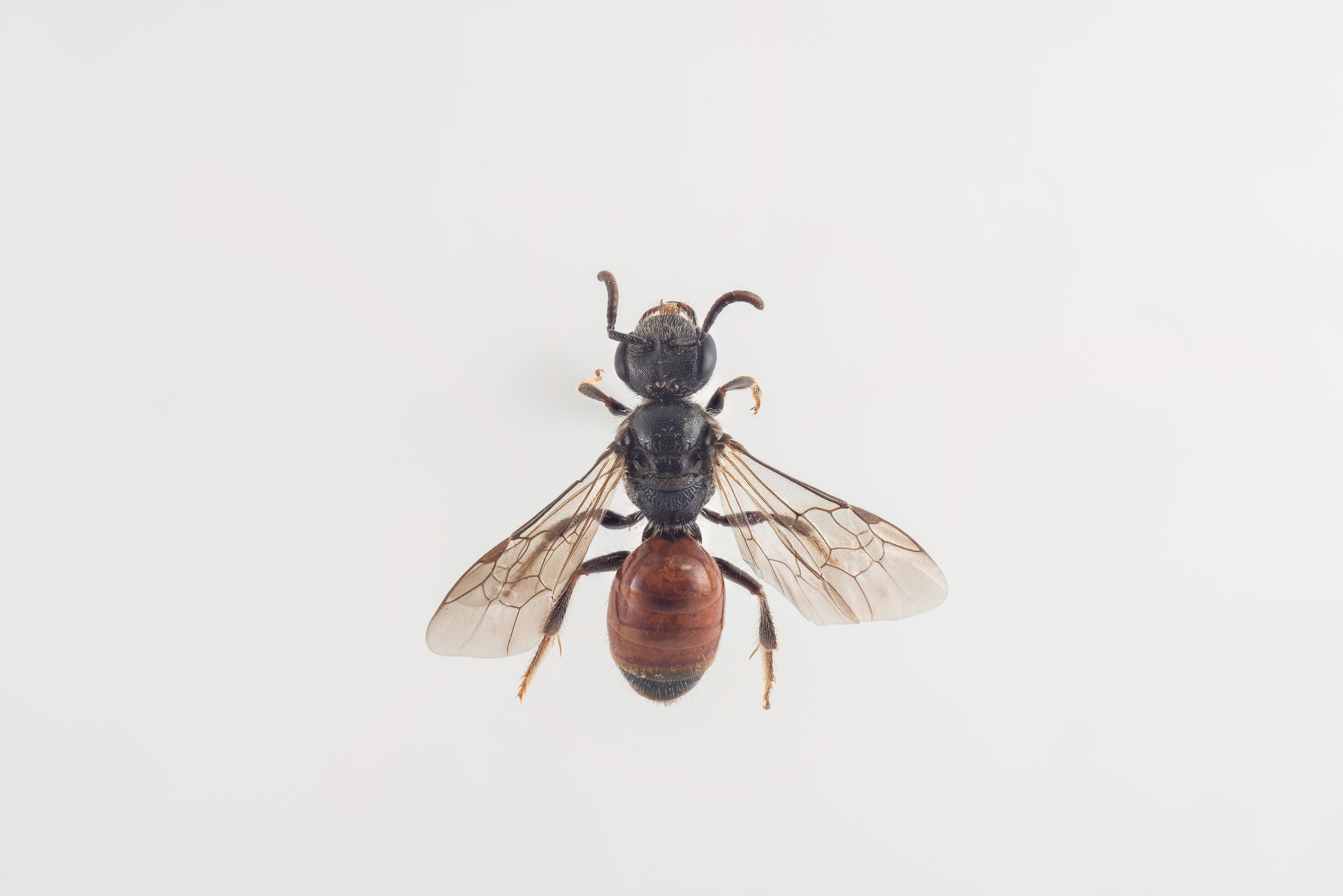
- Sphecodes hyalinatus Norway

Scientific classification
- Domain: Eukaryota
- Kingdom: Animalia
- Phylum: Arthropoda
- Class: Insecta
- Order: Hymenoptera
- Family: Halictidae
- Subfamily: Halictinae
- Genus: Sphecodes
- Species: S. hyalinatus

Binomial name
- Sphecodes hyalinatus von Hagens, 1882

= Sphecodes hyalinatus =

Species of bee

Sphecodes hyalinatus is a Palearctic species of sweat bee.
