= Sphecodes crassicornis =

Scientific classification
- Domain: Eukaryota
- Kingdom: Animalia
- Phylum: Arthropoda
- Class: Insecta
- Order: Hymenoptera
- Family: Halictidae
- Genus: Sphecodes
- Species: S. crassicornis

Binomial name
- Sphecodes crassicornis Smith, 1879

Synonyms
- Sphecodes abuensis Nurse, 1903

Species of bee

Sphecodes crassicornis is a species of bee in the genus Sphecodes, of the family Halictidae.
