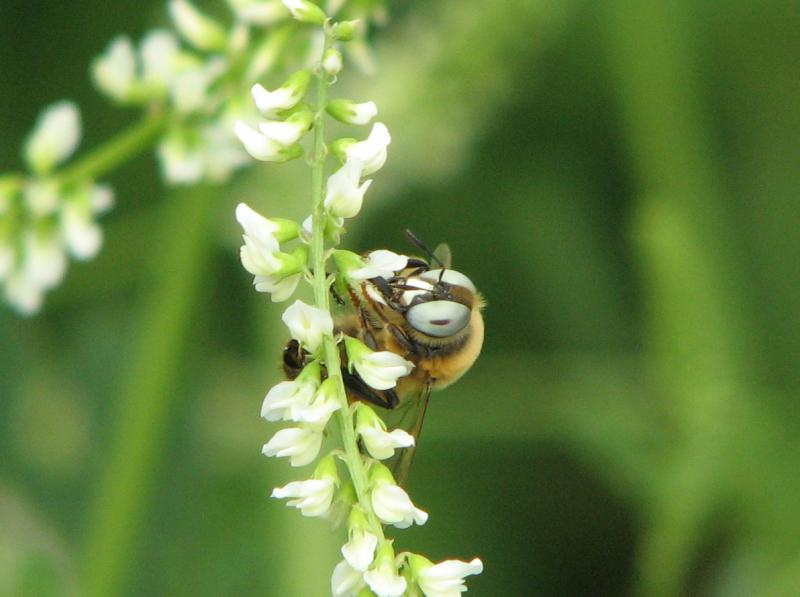

Scientific classification
- Kingdom: Animalia
- Phylum: Arthropoda
- Class: Insecta
- Order: Hymenoptera
- Family: Andrenidae
- Genus: Melitturga
- Species: M. clavicornis

Binomial name
- Melitturga clavicornis (Latreille, 1808)

= Melitturga clavicornis =

Species of bee

Melitturga clavicornis is a species of insect belonging to the family Andrenidae.

It is native to Europe.
