= Lasioglossum prasinum =

Scientific classification
- Domain: Eukaryota
- Kingdom: Animalia
- Phylum: Arthropoda
- Class: Insecta
- Order: Hymenoptera
- Family: Halictidae
- Tribe: Halictini
- Genus: Lasioglossum
- Species: L. prasinum

Binomial name
- Lasioglossum prasinum (Smith, 1848)

Species of bee

Lasioglossum prasinum is a species of insect belonging to the family Halictidae.

It is native to Europe.
