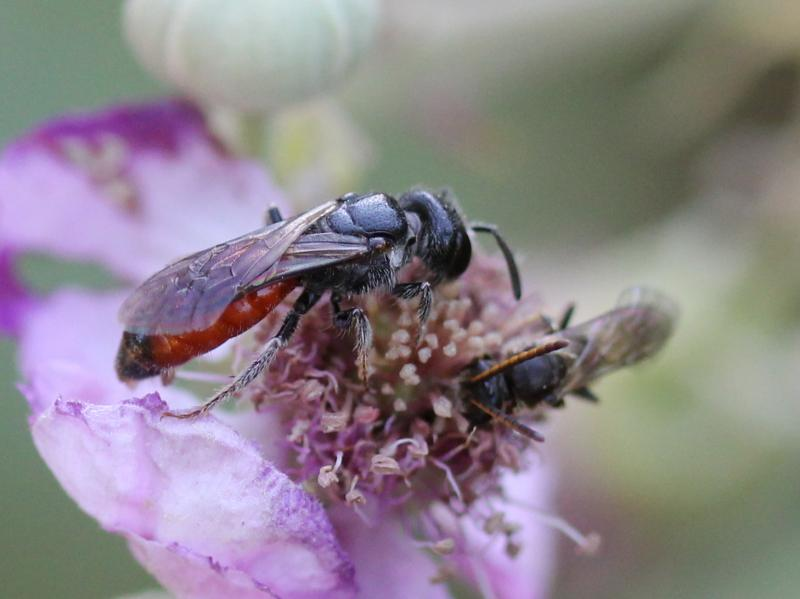

Scientific classification
- Domain: Eukaryota
- Kingdom: Animalia
- Phylum: Arthropoda
- Class: Insecta
- Order: Hymenoptera
- Family: Halictidae
- Genus: Sphecodes
- Species: S. crassus

Binomial name
- Sphecodes crassus Thomson, 1870

Synonyms
- Sphecodes variegatus Hagens 1882; Sphecodes divisus Hagens 1882; Sphecodes valesianus Frey-Gessner 1903

= Sphecodes crassus =

Species of bee

Sphecodes crassus, common name swollen-thighed blood bee, is a species of bee. It was described by Carl Gustaf Thomson in 1870. It is a kleptoparasite of bees of the genus Lasioglossum, and is found throughout Europe.
