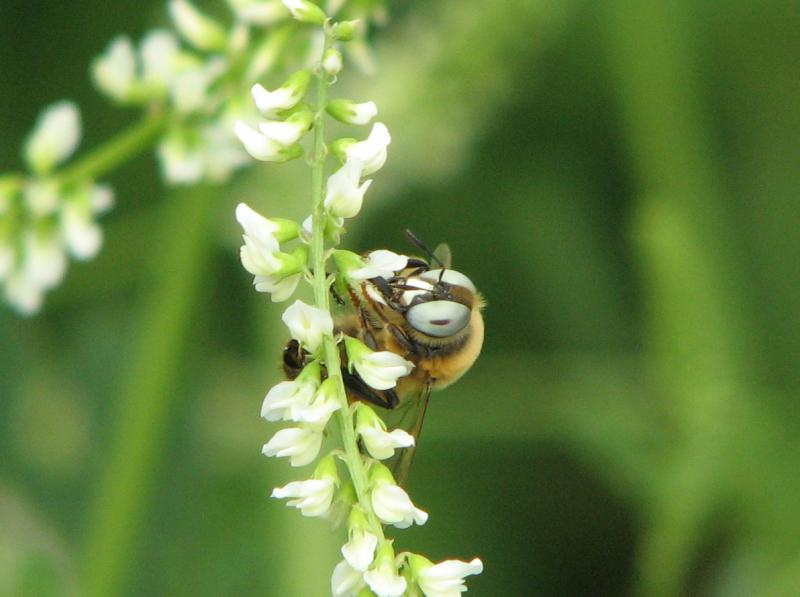

Scientific classification
- Kingdom: Animalia
- Phylum: Arthropoda
- Class: Insecta
- Order: Hymenoptera
- Family: Andrenidae
- Genus: Melitturga; Latreille, 1809

= Melitturga =

Genus of bees

Melitturga is a genus of insect belonging to the family Andrenidae.

The genus was first described by Latreille in 1809.

The species of this genus are found in Eurasia and Africa.

Species:

- Melitturga clavicornis (Latreille, 1808)
