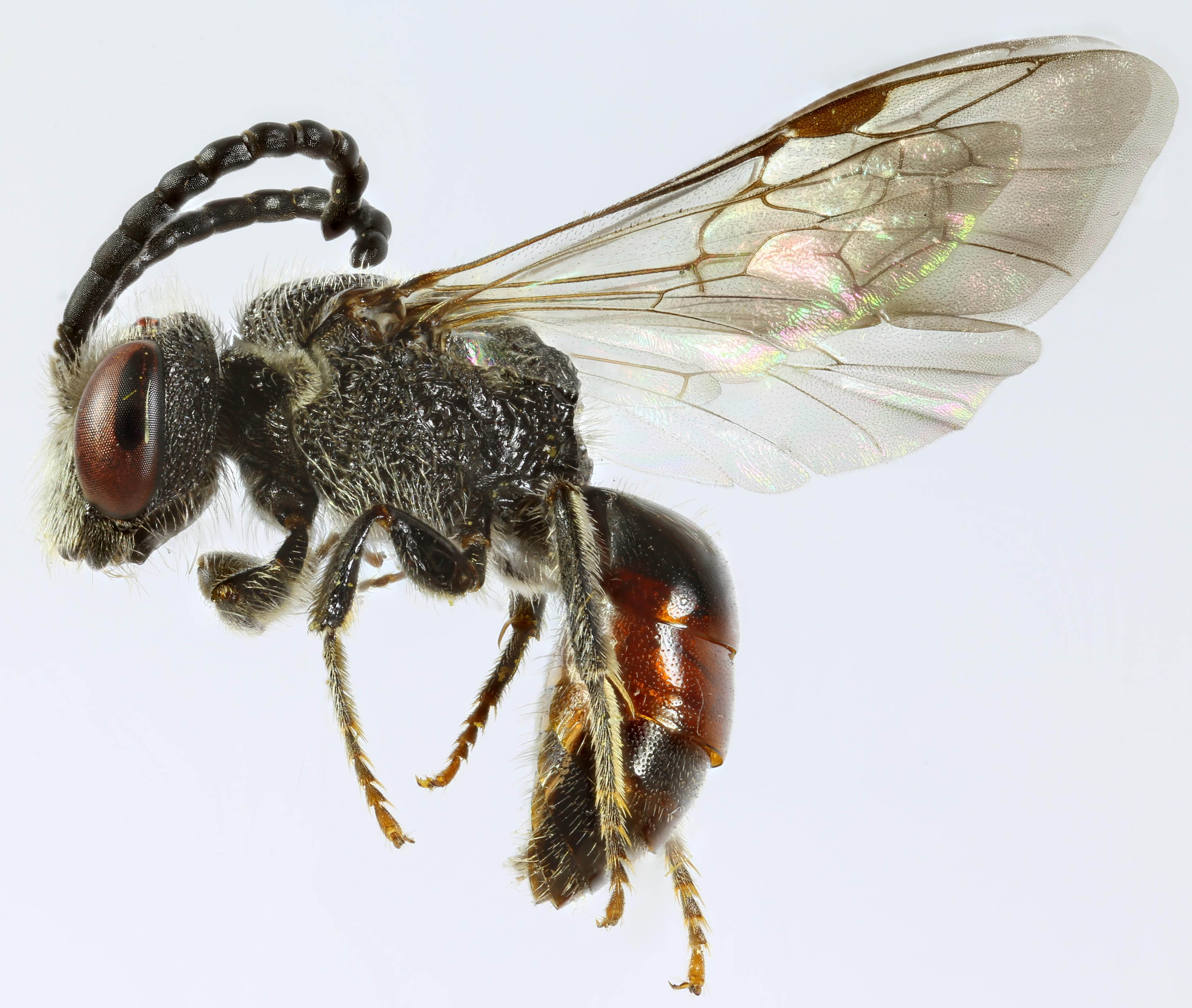
- Sphecodes ephippius male, Trawscoed, North Wales

Scientific classification
- Kingdom: Animalia
- Phylum: Arthropoda
- Class: Insecta
- Order: Hymenoptera
- Family: Halictidae
- Subfamily: Halictinae
- Genus: Sphecodes
- Species: S. ephippius

Binomial name
- Sphecodes ephippius (Linnaeus, 1767)

= Sphecodes ephippius =

Species of bee

Sphecodes ephippius is a Palearctic species of sweat bee.
