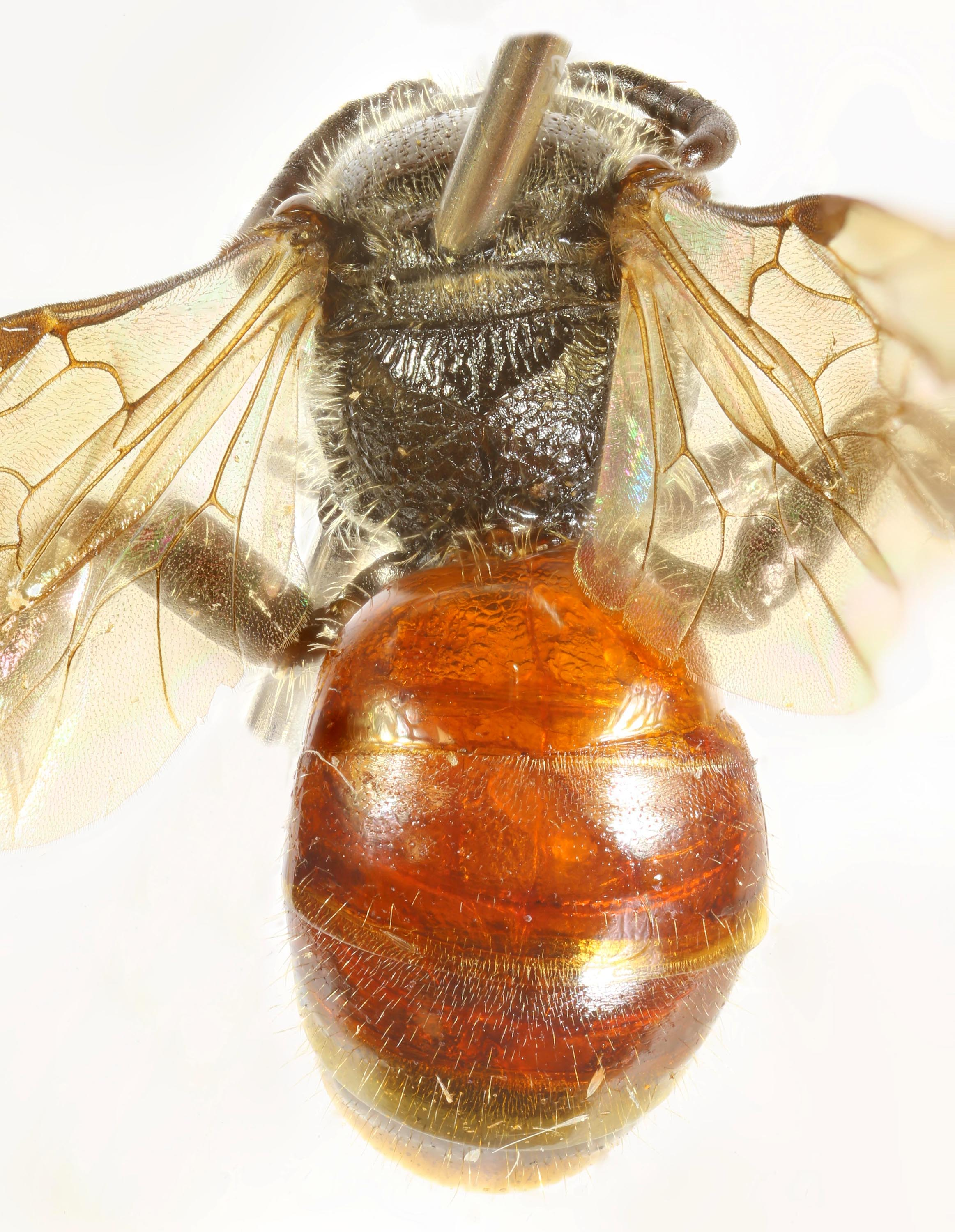
- Sphecodes geoffrellus female, Trawscoed, North Wales

Scientific classification
- Domain: Eukaryota
- Kingdom: Animalia
- Phylum: Arthropoda
- Class: Insecta
- Order: Hymenoptera
- Family: Halictidae
- Subfamily: Halictinae
- Genus: Sphecodes
- Species: S. geoffrellus

Binomial name
- Sphecodes geoffrellus (Kirby, 1802)

= Sphecodes geoffrellus =

Species of bee

Sphecodes geoffrellus is a Palearctic species of sweat bee.
