= Joseph von Hagens =

German entomologist

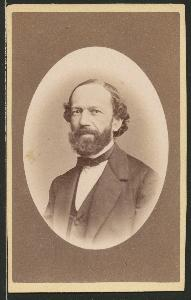
Joseph von Hagens

Joseph von Hagens (1826 in Düsseldorf – 1899 in Düsseldorf) was a German entomologist who specialised in Hymenoptera especially Apidae and Coleoptera.

He was a regional court judge in Dusseldorf.His collection of Apidae was held by the now destroyed Dominikaner-Kloster 'Trans Cedron' Venlo

== Works ==
partial list

- (1874) Genitalien der männlichen Bienen als vorzügliche Mittel zur Artbestimmung. Verhandlungen des Naturhistorischen Vereins der Preussischen Rheinlande und Westfalens, 24: 64; Bonn.
- (1874): Ueber die Genitalien der männlichen Bienen, besonders der Gattung Sphecodes. Berliner Entomologische Zeitschrift, 18: 25; Berlin.
- (1875): Über Bienen- und Ameisenzwitter. Verhandlungen des Naturhistorischen Vereins der Preussischen Rheinlande und Westfalens, 32: 37; Bonn.
- (1876): Die Genitalien der männlichen Bienen. Tageblatt der Versammlung Deutscher Naturforscher und Aerzte, 49: 175; Berlin.
- (1877): Die Bienengattung Sphecodes. Entomologische Nachrichten, 3: 53;Putbus.pdf
- (1882): Ueber die männlichen Genitalien der Bienen-Gattung Sphecodes. Deutsche Entomologische Zeitschrift, 26: 209; Berlin.
