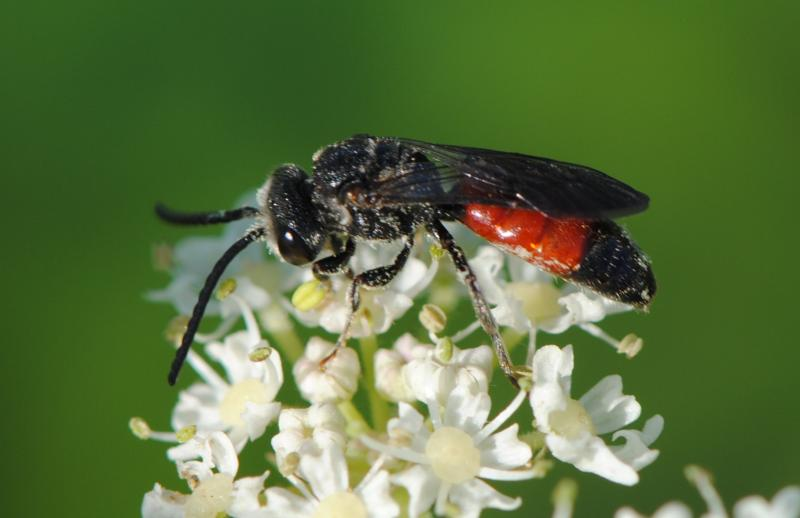
- Sphecodes gibbus

Scientific classification
- Kingdom: Animalia
- Phylum: Arthropoda
- Clade: Pancrustacea
- Class: Insecta
- Order: Hymenoptera
- Family: Halictidae
- Subfamily: Halictinae
- Tribe: Halictini
- Genus: Sphecodes; Latreille, 1804

Type species
- Sphecodes gibbus (Linnaeus, 1758)

Species
- See text

= Sphecodes =

Genus of bees

Sphecodes is a genus of cuckoo bees from the family Halictidae, the majority of which are black and red in colour and are colloquially known as blood bees. Sphecodes bees are kleptoparasitic on ground-nesting bees, especially bees in the genera Lasioglossum, Halictus and Andrena. The adults consume nectar, but because they use other bees' provisions to feed their offspring they do not collect pollen.

== Distribution ==
Sphecodes is a cosmopolitan genus with species represented on every continent except Antarctica. The genus is also very species rich, with 21 species described from Siberia, 33 species from Central Europe, 17 species from the Indian region, 26 from the Arabian Peninsula and surrounding region, and 21 from Southeast Asia. In the Americas, there are 11 species described from the Neotropics and 63 from the Nearctic. Australia has only two native species, S. manskii and S. profugus, both of which are restricted to the northeast. The species Sphecodes albilabris is thought to have been introduced to both Australia and the United States by accident.

== Taxonomy ==
Phylogenetic relationships among the Sphecodine genera Microsphecodes, Eupetersia, Sphecodes, and Austrosphecodes

The genus was erected in 1804 by Pierre Latreille for the species Sphecodes gibbus. That species was initially described by Carl Linnaeus as Sphex gibba. The fact that the type specimen was initially described as a wasp was not lost on Latreille as the name he chose for the genus, Sphecodes, means "like a wasp". In the late 18th and early 19th-centuries, the taxonomy of Apoidea was very unclear, and at various points Sphecodes species were described as the following genera: Sphex Linnaeus, 1758; Nomada Latrielle, 1802; Halictus Latrielle, 1804; Apis Linnaeus, 1758; Melitta Kirby, 1802; Andrena Fabricius, 1775; and Tiphia Fabricius, 1775.

The following genera are now considered synonyms of Sphecodes: Dichroa Illiger, 1806; Sabulicola Verhoeff 1890; Thrausmus Buysson 1900; Dialonia Robertson, 1903; Machaeris Robertson, 1903; Stelidium Robertson, 1903; and Sphegodes Mavromoustakis, 1949.

Charles Robertson was particularly prolific in describing genera that would be synonomized with Sphecodes later on, although the differences he noticed are now reflected in the subgenera. The following genera are now considered subgenera: Drepanium Robertson, 1903; Proteraner Robertson, 1903; and Sphecodium Robertson, 1903. Subgeneric classifications are currently debated, and whether they are truly monophyletic groups remains unknown.

Callosphecodes Friese, 1909 may either be a synonym or subgenus, but specimens that match its description are exceedingly rare.

=== Phylogeny ===
Relatively few phylogenetic studies have been completed for the genus, and none that are exhaustive or analyze biogeography. Sphecodes is a member of the family Halictidae and in the tribe Sphecodini. Sphecodini is sister to Halictini sensu stricto. Genus-level relationships within Sphecodini are still being determined, but recent phylogenies suggest that Sphecodes is sister to the genus Eupetersia. It is unknown exactly how many species there are worldwide, and even well-studied regions of the world such as the United States and Europe likely have many species to be described or synonymized.

A note on Halictinae tribes

There are two diverging approaches to tribe-level phylogenies within Halictinae. The first, used by taxonomists like Danforth, Gibbs, and Brady recognizes five distinct tribes: Augochlorini, Thrinchostomini, Caenohalictini, Halictini sensu stricto, and Sphecodini. This is also the approach that Wikipedia uses. The second, used by Ascher, Michener, Straka, and Engel among others recognizes only two: Augochlorini and Halictini sensu lato, with the rest of the tribes relegated to subtribes within Halictini s. l. This approach is also used by resources such as iNaturalist and BugGuide. Both are valid and represent the same evolutionary relationships.

== Morphology ==
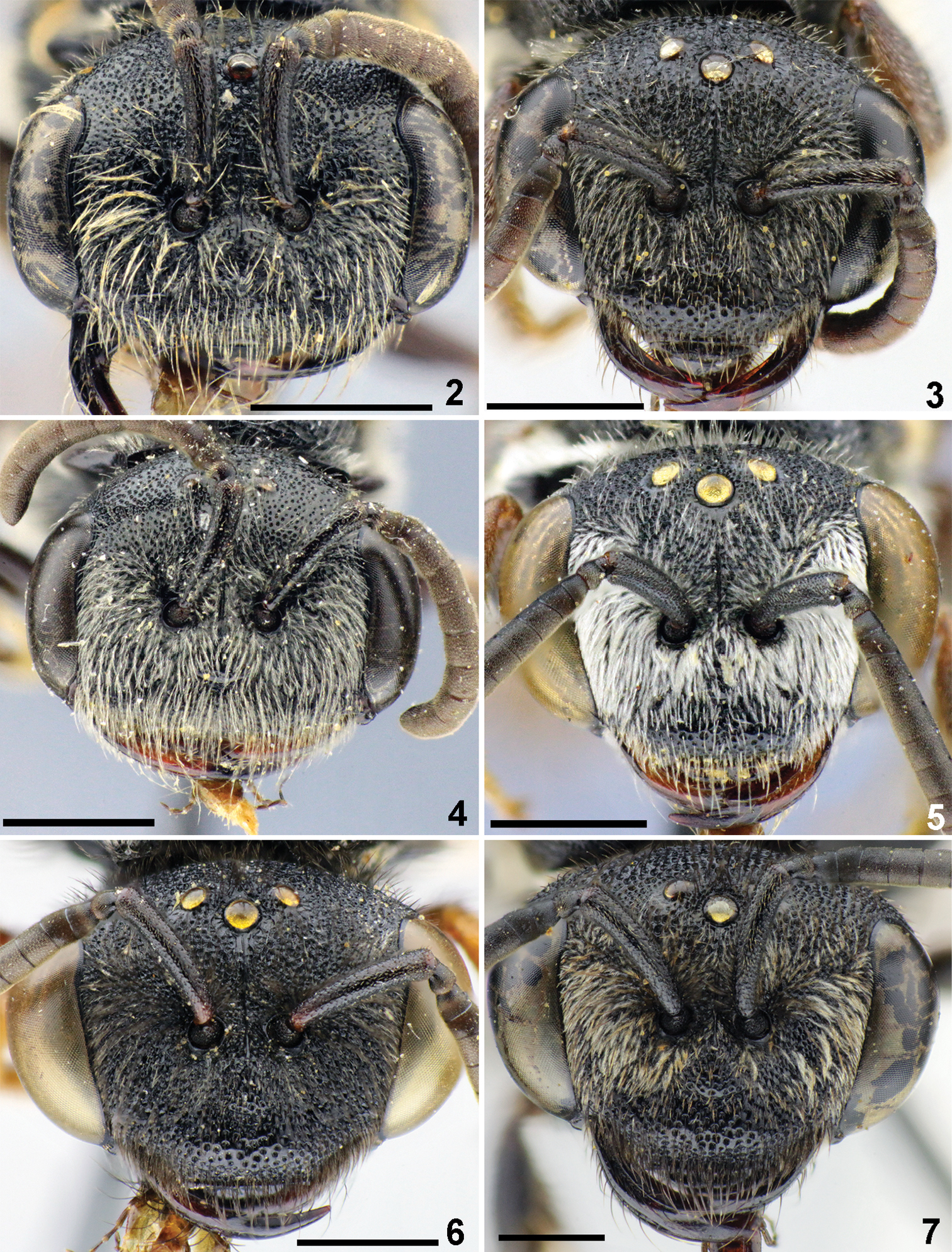
Front view of the head shape of six Sphecodes species: S. majalis, S. scabricollis, S. barbatus, S. atlanticus, S. rubripes, and S. albilabris

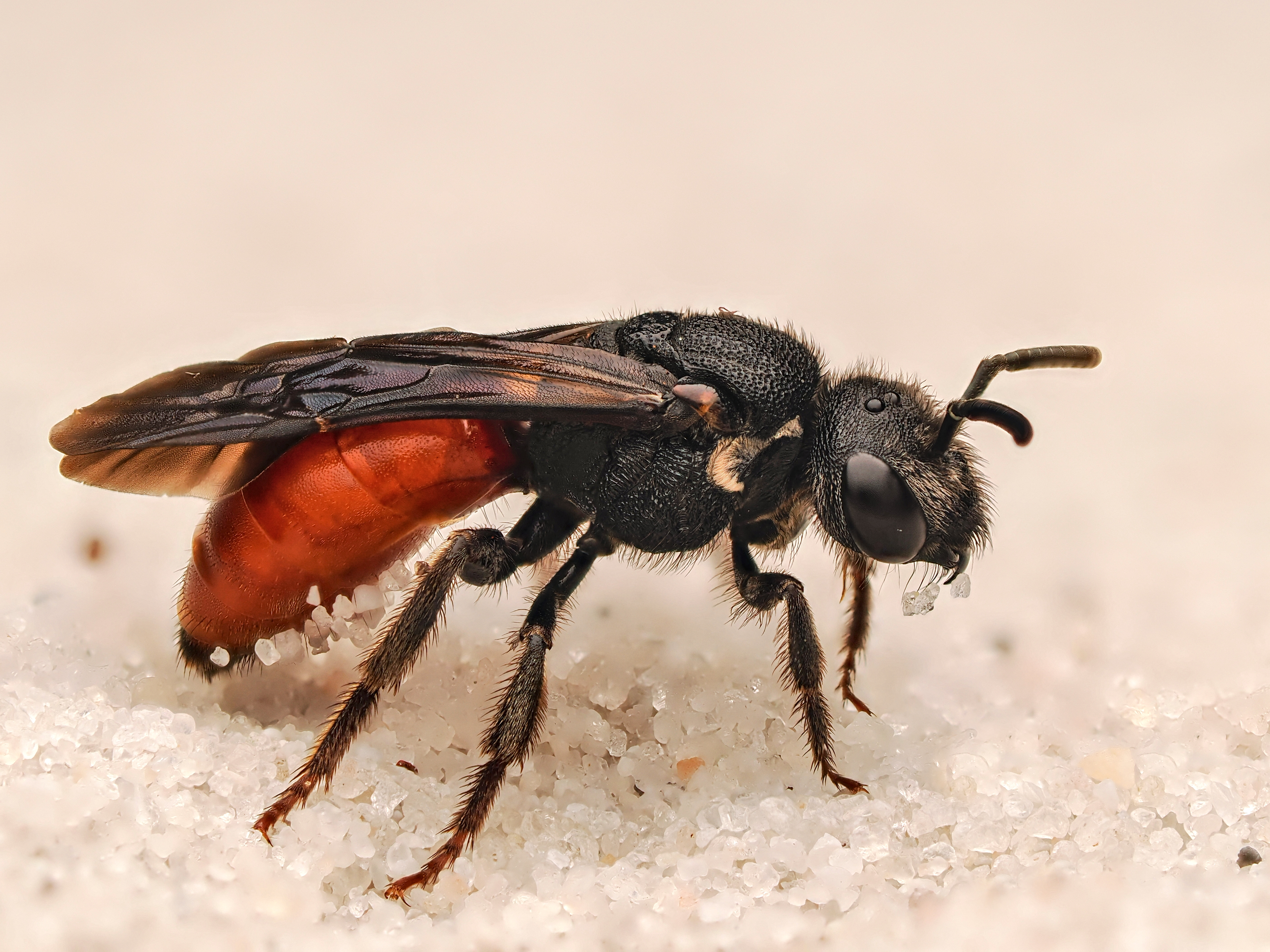
Sphecodes albilabris resting in sand

Sphecodes is in the family Halictidae, a group distinguished from other bee families by a highly arcuate basal vein. In North America, Sphecodes is the only genus of Sphecodini present.

Sphecodes are small-to-medium bees, usually with distinctive red abdomens although males are sometimes entirely black. The genus has somewhat oval, brachycephalic heads and thicker antennae compared to other bees. Most species have three submarginal cells, but some consistently have two, and others have either two or three. Their body size is correlated with that of their host: large Sphecodes parasitize larger hosts like Andrena, while small Sphecodes are more often associated with small hosts like Perdita. Like other kleptoparasitic bees, they are largely hairless and females lack scopae on their hind tibia. Both sexes have thickened and highly rugose cuticles. This adaptation allows them to deflect and block stings when fighting their hosts. In many other cuckoo bee genera, the larvae sport large mandibles used to kill the host. These are absent in the young of Sphecodes, where it is the adult that dispatches the host egg or larva.

Identification of these bees is difficult, in part due to lack of research and published keys. Important characters include the antennae, mandibles, propodeum, and male genitalia.

== Natural history ==
Sphecodes are most commonly found hovering over the nest sites of their host bees. Females will either kill the hosts or wait until the nests are unguarded. She will then enter the nest, laying her own egg on the pollen provisions and killing the egg or larvae of the host. The larval bee will feed on the pollen provisions throughout the winter, emerging as adults in the spring or fall. Their phenology does not necessarily overlap with that of their host, making host associations sometimes difficult to determine.

Phylogeny of the genus Sphecodes, with known host associations and ancestral state reconstruction

There are few studies of parasitism within Sphecodes and much of what we know is inferred from a small number of observations. Due to the range of sociality of its hosts, particularly Halictus and Lasioglossum, Sphecodes species display a broad range of parasitism tactics.

For solitary hosts or social hosts in a solitary phase of their lifecycle, the female Sphecodes will wait until the host leaves. Then, she will enter the nest undetected, laying her eggs in recently closed nest cells. If the host bee comes back, the Sphecodes will fight with her, typically killing or parasitizing the host. Other cuckoo bee genera such as Nomada also sneak into unguarded nests, chemically mimicking their Andrena hosts to remain undetected. Surprisingly, studies of the cuticular hydrocarbons and Dufour's gland secretions suggest that Sphecodes do not mimic their host.

If the hosts are either communal or eusocial and thus always have some bees guarding their nests, Sphecodes will deploy a different tactic. In this scenario, the female Sphecodes drives the host out of the nest, possibly chemically. Augochlora have been reported leaving disoriented, or in quick flight.

Some species will also deploy a much more aggressive response, battling and killing every member of the colony. She will then spend several hours laying eggs in the provisioned brood cells. The propensity for Sphecodes to kill the adult hosts is unusual in kleptoparasitic bees, although they prefer to enter unguarded nests.

=== Hosts ===
Sphecodes species are most frequently associated with the closely related genera Lasioglossum and Halictus. However, they have also been known to parasitize Perdita, Andrena, Calliopsis, Augochlorella, Melitturga, Colletes, Agapostemon, and possibly Augochloropsis. Host associations of most Sphecodes species, particularly outside of Europe, are largely unknown.

Some species parasitize a wide range of hosts, while others are species or genus-specific. Within a generalist species, however, studies have shown that individual bees are typically specialists: a single female Sphecodes will visit the nests of a single host species, although other individuals of the same species of Sphecodes may use different hosts.

Host switching is widespread in the evolution of Sphecodes, with one paper finding it has evolved at least 17 times. This flexibility could be due to their destructive modes of parasitism or the high degree of host generalism.

== Species ==
There are over 300 known species in the genus Sphecodes. As of 2015, there were 319 valid species described. The following list may be incomplete and does not reflect recent synonomies.

- Sphecodes abuensis Nurse, 1903
- Sphecodes abyssinicus Sichel, 1865
- Sphecodes aeneiceps Friese, 1917
- Sphecodes aino Tsuneki, 1983
- Sphecodes akitanus Tsuneki, 1983
- Sphecodes albifrons Smith, 1879
- Sphecodes albilabris (Fabricius, 1793)
- Sphecodes albociliatus Meyer, 1922
- Sphecodes algoensis Blüthgen, 1928
- Sphecodes alternatus Smith, 1853
- Sphecodes amakusensis Yasumatsu & Hirashima, 1951
- Sphecodes anatolicus Warncke, 1992
- Sphecodes andinus Schrottky, 1906
- Sphecodes angarensis Cockerell, 1937
- Sphecodes anonymus Blüthgen, 1928
- Sphecodes antennariae Robertson, 1891
- Sphecodes apicatus Smith, 1853
- Sphecodes arequipae Meyer, 1925
- Sphecodes argentinus Schrottky, 1906
- Sphecodes armeniacus Warncke, 1992
- Sphecodes arnoldi Blüthgen, 1928
- Sphecodes aroniae Mitchell, 1960
- Sphecodes arroyanus Cockerell, 1904
- Sphecodes arvensiformis Cockerell, 1904
- Sphecodes asclepiadis Cockerell, 1898
- Sphecodes aspericollis Sichel, 1865
- Sphecodes assamensis Blüthgen, 1927
- Sphecodes atlanticus Warncke, 1992
- Sphecodes atlantis Mitchell, 1956
- Sphecodes atriapicatus Strand, 1912
- Sphecodes autumnalis Mitchell, 1956
- Sphecodes awaensis Tsuneki, 1983
- Sphecodes bakeri Cockerell, 1915
- Sphecodes banaszaki Nobile & Turrisi, 2004
- Sphecodes banksii Lovell, 1909
- Sphecodes baratonis Tsuneki, 1983
- Sphecodes barbatus Blüthgen, 1923
- Sphecodes basalis Sichel, 1865
- Sphecodes binghami Blüthgen, 1924
- Sphecodes biroi Friese, 1909
- Sphecodes bischoffi Meyer, 1925
- Sphecodes bogotensis Meyer, 1922
- Sphecodes bonaerensis Holmberg, 1886
- Sphecodes borealis Cockerell, 1937
- Sphecodes brachycephalus Mitchell, 1956
- Sphecodes brasiliensis Schrottky, 1910
- Sphecodes braunsi Blüthgen, 1928
- Sphecodes breviclypeatus Tsuneki, 1984
- Sphecodes bruchi Schrottky, 1906
- Sphecodes brunneipes Friese, 1914
- Sphecodes californicus Meyer, 1922
- Sphecodes campadellii Nobile & Turrisi, 2004
- Sphecodes candidus Meyer, 1925
- Sphecodes capensis Cameron, 1905
- Sphecodes capriciosus Schrottky, 1906
- Sphecodes capverdensis Pauly & LaRoche, 2002
- Sphecodes carolinus Mitchell, 1956
- Sphecodes castaneae Mitchell, 1960
- Sphecodes centralis Cockerell, 1938
- Sphecodes cephalotes Meyer, 1920
- Sphecodes chaprensis Blüthgen, 1927
- Sphecodes chibaensis Tsuneki, 1984
- Sphecodes chichibuensis Tsuneki, 1986
- Sphecodes chichibuus Tsuneki, 1986
- Sphecodes chilensis Spinola, 1851
- Sphecodes clematidis Robertson, 1897
- Sphecodes clypeatus Friese, 1917
- Sphecodes columbiae Cockerell, 1906
- Sphecodes combai Nobile & Turrisi, 2004
- Sphecodes confertus Say, 1837
- Sphecodes confusus Blüthgen, 1928
- Sphecodes congoensis (Benoist, 1950)
- Sphecodes connexus Blüthgen, 1928
- Sphecodes convergens Michener, 1978
- Sphecodes convergens Tsuneki, 1983
- Sphecodes coptis Tsuneki, 1983
- Sphecodes cordillerensis Jörgensen, 1912
- Sphecodes cordovensis (Cockerell, 1919)
- Sphecodes coriae Moure & Hurd, 1987
- Sphecodes coronus Mitchell, 1956
- Sphecodes costaricensis Friese, 1917
- Sphecodes crassanus Warncke, 1992
- Sphecodes crassicornis Smith, 1879
- Sphecodes crassus Thomson, 1870
- Sphecodes crawfordi Mitchell, 1956
- Sphecodes cressonii (Robertson, 1903)
- Sphecodes cristatus Hagens, 1882
- Sphecodes croaticus Meyer, 1922
- Sphecodes daishi Tsuneki, 1983
- Sphecodes dathei Schwarz, 2010
- Sphecodes davisii Robertson, 1897
- Sphecodes decorus (Cameron, 1897)
- Sphecodes dichrous Smith, 1853
- Sphecodes dilutus Cockerell, 1936
- Sphecodes diremptus Cockerell, 1932
- Sphecodes discoverlifei Astafurova & Proshchalykin, 2020
- Sphecodes distinctus Meyer, 1925
- Sphecodes duplex Blüthgen, 1927
- Sphecodes duplipunctatus Tsuneki, 1983
- Sphecodes dusmeti Blüthgen, 1924
- Sphecodes dyozankeanus Tsuneki, 1983
- Sphecodes engeli Astafurova & Proshchalykin, 2020
- Sphecodes ephippius (Linné, 1767)
- Sphecodes equator Vachal, 1904
- Sphecodes eritrinus Friese, 1915
- Sphecodes eugnathus Blüthgen, 1928
- Sphecodes eustictus Cockerell, 1906
- Sphecodes exaltus Mitchell, 1956
- Sphecodes fattigi Mitchell, 1956
- Sphecodes ferruginatus Hagens, 1882
- Sphecodes fimbriatus Blüthgen, 1928
- Sphecodes formosus Cockerell, 1911
- Sphecodes fortior Cockerell, 1898
- Sphecodes fragariae Cockerell, 1903
- Sphecodes friesei Herbst, 1908
- Sphecodes fudzi Tsuneki, 1983
- Sphecodes fuelleborni Blüthgen, 1928
- Sphecodes fukuiensis Tsuneki, 1983
- Sphecodes fumipennis Smith, 1853
- Sphecodes galeritus Blüthgen, 1927
- Sphecodes galerus Lovell & Cockerell, 1907
- Sphecodes genaroi Engel, 2006
- Sphecodes geoffrellus (Kirby, 1802)
- Sphecodes gibbus (Linnaeus, 1758)
- Sphecodes grahami Cockerell, 1922
- Sphecodes grandidieri (Buysson, 1901)
- Sphecodes granulosus Sichel, 1865
- Sphecodes guineensis Vachal, 1903
- Sphecodes hagensi Ritsema, 1880
- Sphecodes haladai Warncke, 1992
- Sphecodes hanedai Tsuneki, 1983
- Sphecodes hasshanus Tsuneki, 1983
- Sphecodes hemirhodurus Cockerell, 1921
- Sphecodes heraclei Robertson, 1897
- Sphecodes hesperellus Cockerell, 1904
- Sphecodes hirtellus Blüthgen, 1923
- Sphecodes howardi Cockerell, 1922
- Sphecodes hudsoni Cockerell, 1913
- Sphecodes hyalinatus Hagens, 1882
- Sphecodes hydrangeae Mitchell, 1956
- Sphecodes illinoensis (Robertson, 1903)
- Sphecodes ilyadadaria Astafurova & Proshchalykin, 2020
- Sphecodes indicus Bingham, 1898
- Sphecodes invidus (Cameron, 1897)
- Sphecodes inornatus (Schrottky, 1902)
- Sphecodes insularis Smith, 1858
- Sphecodes intermedius Blüthgen, 1923
- Sphecodes iosephi Nobile & Turrisi, 2004
- Sphecodes iridescens Cockerell, 1921
- Sphecodes iridipennis Smith, 1879
- Sphecodes itidyo Tsuneki, 1983
- Sphecodes ituriensis Blüthgen, 1928
- Sphecodes iwatensis Tsuneki, 1983
- Sphecodes izumindus Tsuneki, 1986
- Sphecodes japonicus Cockerell, 1911
- Sphecodes javanicus Friese, 1914
- Sphecodes joergenseni Meyer, 1920
- Sphecodes johnsonii Lovell, 1909
- Sphecodes kaisensis Tsuneki, 1983
- Sphecodes kamafuse Tsuneki, 1983
- Sphecodes kershawi Perkins, 1921
- Sphecodes kincaidii Cockerell, 1898
- Sphecodes kisukei Tsuneki, 1983
- Sphecodes kitamius Tsuneki, 1983
- Sphecodes knetschi Cockerell, 1898
- Sphecodes koikensis Tsuneki, 1983
- Sphecodes kristenseni Meyer, 1919
- Sphecodes laetus Meyer, 1922
- Sphecodes lasimensis Blüthgen, 1927
- Sphecodes laticaudatus Tsuneki, 1983
- Sphecodes laticeps Meyer, 1920
- Sphecodes latifrons Cockerell, 1919
- Sphecodes lautipennis Cockerell, 1908
- Sphecodes levicinctus Cockerell, 1936
- Sphecodes levis Lovell & Cockerell, 1907
- Sphecodes libericus Cockerell, 1936
- Sphecodes longuloides Blüthgen, 1923
- Sphecodes longulus Hagens, 1882
- Sphecodes lunaris Vachal, 1904
- Sphecodes luteiventris Friese, 1925
- Sphecodes luzonicus Blüthgen, 1925
- Sphecodes macswaini Michener, 1954
- Sphecodes maetai Tsuneki, 1984
- Sphecodes magnipunctatus (Cockerell, 1946)
- Sphecodes majalis Pérez, 1903
- Sphecodes malayensis Blüthgen, 1927
- Sphecodes manchurianus Strand & Yasumatsu, 1938
- Sphecodes mandibularis Cresson, 1872
- Sphecodes manni Cockerell, 1913
- Sphecodes manskii (Rayment, 1935)
- Sphecodes marcellinoi Nobile & Turrisi, 2004
- Sphecodes marginatus Hagens, 1882
- Sphecodes maruyamanus Tsuneki, 1983
- Sphecodes melanopus Schrottky, 1906
- Sphecodes mendocinus Jörgensen, 1912
- Sphecodes metanotiaeus Sichel, 1865
- Sphecodes metathoracicus Sichel, 1865
- Sphecodes mexicanorum Cockerell, 1919
- Sphecodes millsi Cockerell, 1919
- Sphecodes minarum Schrottky, 1910
- Sphecodes miniatus Hagens, 1882
- Sphecodes minor Robertson, 1898
- Sphecodes monilicornis (Kirby, 1802)
- Sphecodes montanus Smith, 1879
- Sphecodes murotai Tsuneki, 1983
- Sphecodes mutillaeformis Schrottky, 1906
- Sphecodes mutsu Tsuneki, 1983
- Sphecodes mutsuoides Tsuneki, 1984
- Sphecodes nambui Tsuneki, 1983
- Sphecodes natalensis Friese, 1925
- Sphecodes niger Hagens, 1874
- Sphecodes nigeriae Blüthgen, 1928
- Sphecodes nigricans Timberlake, 1940
- Sphecodes nigricorpus Mitchell, 1956
- Sphecodes nigritus Ashmead, 1900
- Sphecodes nippon Meyer, 1922
- Sphecodes nipponicus Yasumatsu & Hirashima, 1951
- Sphecodes nitidissimus Cockerell, 1910
- Sphecodes niveatus Meyer, 1925
- Sphecodes niveipennis Meyer, 1925
- Sphecodes nomioidis Pesenko, 1979
- Sphecodes nyassanus Strand, 1911
- Sphecodes ohdeyamanus Tsuneki, 1984
- Sphecodes ohtsukius Tsuneki, 1984
- Sphecodes okuyetsu Tsuneki, 1983
- Sphecodes olivieri Lepeletier, 1825
- Sphecodes olympicus Cockerell, 1904
- Sphecodes oneili Cameron, 1905
- Sphecodes oriundus Vachal, 1903
- Sphecodes pallitarsis Vachal, 1909
- Sphecodes paraguayensis Schrottky, 1906
- Sphecodes paraplesius Lovell, 1911
- Sphecodes patagonicus Schrottky, 1906
- Sphecodes patruelis Cockerell, 1913
- Sphecodes pecosensis Cockerell, 1904
- Sphecodes pectoralis Morawitz, 1876
- Sphecodes pellucidus Smith, 1845
- Sphecodes perlustrans Cockerell, 1898
- Sphecodes perplexus Nurse, 1903
- Sphecodes persimilis Lovell & Cockerell, 1907
- Sphecodes peruensis Meyer, 1925
- Sphecodes pieli Cockerell, 1931
- Sphecodes pilosulus Smith, 1879
- Sphecodes pimpinellae Robertson, 1900
- Sphecodes pinguiculus Pérez, 1903
- Sphecodes politulus Cockerell, 1937
- Sphecodes profugus Cockerell, 1910
- Sphecodes propinquus Blüthgen, 1928
- Sphecodes prosphorus Lovell & Cockerell, 1907
- Sphecodes prostygius Mitchell, 1960
- Sphecodes pseudocrassus Blüthgen, 1924
- Sphecodes pseudofasciatus Blüthgen, 1925
- Sphecodes pseudoredivivus Astafurova & Proshchalykin, 2020
- Sphecodes pulsatillae Cockerell, 1906
- Sphecodes punctatus Sichel, 1865
- Sphecodes puncticeps Thomson, 1870
- Sphecodes puncticollis Sichel, 1865
- Sphecodes punctiscutum Eardley & R. P. Urban, 2006
- Sphecodes pusillus Cockerell, 1937
- Sphecodes pycnanthemi Robertson, 1897
- Sphecodes quadrimaculatus Blüthgen, 1928
- Sphecodes quellensis Blüthgen, 1927
- Sphecodes ralunensis Friese, 1909
- Sphecodes ranunculi Robertson, 1897
- Sphecodes redivivus Blüthgen, 1927
- Sphecodes reticulatus Thomson, 1870
- Sphecodes rhois (Cockerell, 1904)
- Sphecodes rikuchu Tsuneki, 1983
- Sphecodes rohweri Cockerell, 1907
- Sphecodes rotundiceps Cockerell, 1919
- Sphecodes rubicundus Hagens, 1875
- Sphecodes rubripes Spinola, 1838
- Sphecodes rudiusculus (Benoist, 1964)
- Sphecodes rufichelis Strand, 1912
- Sphecodes ruficrus (Erichson, 1835)
- Sphecodes rufiscapis Vachal, 1909
- Sphecodes rufithorax Morawitz, 1876
- Sphecodes rufiventris (Panzer, 1798)
- Sphecodes rufoantennatus Benoist, 1950
- Sphecodes rugulosus Sichel, 1865
- Sphecodes samarensis Blüthgen, 1927
- Sphecodes sapporensis Tsuneki, 1983
- Sphecodes sauteri Meyer, 1925
- Sphecodes saxicolus Warncke, 1992
- Sphecodes scabricollis Wesmael, 1835
- Sphecodes schenckii Hagens, 1882
- Sphecodes schoanus Blüthgen, 1928
- Sphecodes schwarzi Astafurova & Proshchalykin, 2015
- Sphecodes scrobiculatus Pauly & Brooks, 2001
- Sphecodes semicoloratus (Cockerell, 1897)
- Sphecodes senegalensis Sichel, 1865
- Sphecodes shawi Lovell, 1911
- Sphecodes shillongensis Blüthgen, 1927
- Sphecodes shirozui Tsuneki, 1983
- Sphecodes sibuyanensis Cockerell, 1925
- Sphecodes sikkimensis Blüthgen, 1927
- Sphecodes silvicola Tsuneki, 1983
- Sphecodes simillimus Smith, 1873
- Sphecodes simlaensis Blüthgen, 1924
- Sphecodes smilacinae Robertson, 1897
- Sphecodes solidaginis Cockerell, 1937
- Sphecodes solonis Graenicher, 1911
- Sphecodes sophiae Cockerell, 1898
- Sphecodes spinulosus Hagens, 1875
- Sphecodes strandi Meyer, 1920
- Sphecodes stygius Robertson, 1893
- Sphecodes subconfertus Sichel, 1865
- Sphecodes sudai Tsuneki, 1983
- Sphecodes sulcatulus Cockerell, 1906
- Sphecodes sulcifera Tsuneki, 1983
- Sphecodes tadschicus Blüthgen 1935
- Sphecodes taicho Tsuneki, 1983
- Sphecodes tainoi Engel, 2006
- Sphecodes tanoi Tsuneki, 1983
- Sphecodes tantalus Nurse, 1903
- Sphecodes tertius Blüthgen, 1927
- Sphecodes togoanus Strand, 1912
- Sphecodes tomarchioi Nobile & Turrisi, 2004
- Sphecodes townesi Mitchell, 1956
- Sphecodes transversus Cockerell, 1919
- Sphecodes trentonensis Cockerell, 1913
- Sphecodes tristellus Cockerell, 1919
- Sphecodes tuckeri Friese, 1925
- Sphecodes turanicus Astafurova & Proshchalykin, 2017
- Sphecodes turneri Cockerell, 1916
- Sphecodes ugandae Blüthgen, 1928
- Sphecodes utinamius Tsuneki, 1983
- Sphecodes vachali Meyer, 1920
- Sphecodes variabilis Schrottky, 1906
- Sphecodes veganus Cockerell, 1904
- Sphecodes villosulus Schwarz, 2010
- Sphecodes vumbuensis Blüthgen, 1928
- Sphecodes walteri Nobile & Turrisi, 2004
- Sphecodes washingtoni Cockerell, 1904
- Sphecodes wheeleri Mitchell, 1956
- Sphecodes woodi Cockerell, 1945
- Sphecodes zangherii Noskiewicz, 1931
