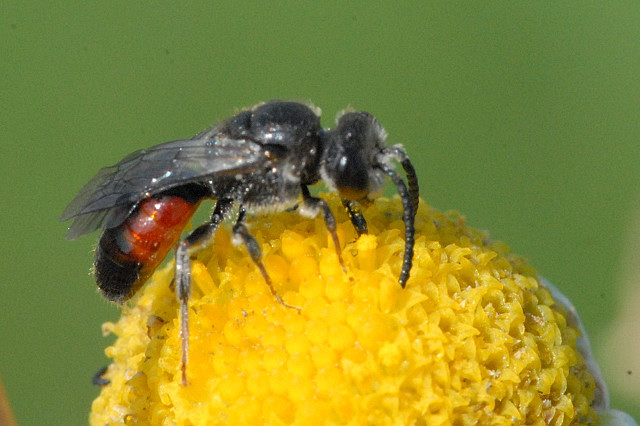
- Sphecodes monilicornis Ardennes

Scientific classification
- Domain: Eukaryota
- Kingdom: Animalia
- Phylum: Arthropoda
- Class: Insecta
- Order: Hymenoptera
- Family: Halictidae
- Subfamily: Halictinae
- Genus: Sphecodes
- Species: S. monilicornis

Binomial name
- Sphecodes monilicornis (Kirby, 1802)

= Sphecodes monilicornis =

Species of bee

Sphecodes monilicornis is a Palearctic species of sweat bee.
