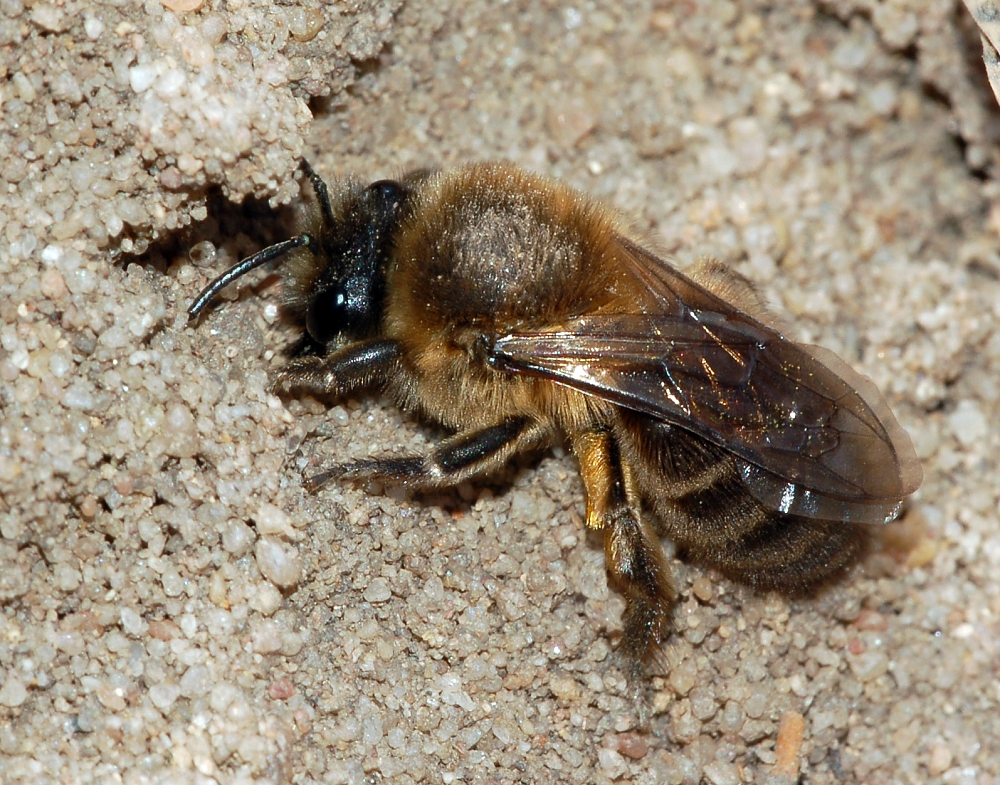

Conservation status
- Least Concern (IUCN 3.1)

Scientific classification
- Kingdom: Animalia
- Phylum: Arthropoda
- Clade: Pancrustacea
- Class: Insecta
- Order: Hymenoptera
- Family: Colletidae
- Genus: Colletes
- Species: C. cunicularius

Binomial name
- Colletes cunicularius (Linnaeus,1761)

= Colletes cunicularius =

Species of bee

Colletes cunicularius, the vernal colletes or spring mining bee, is a species of solitary bee from the family Colletidae which is widespread in the Palearctic from Britain to the Pacific Ocean which nests in areas of open, sandy soil.

== Description ==
Colletes cinicularius is a large species of Colletes which has an unbanded, hairy, black abdomen which contrasts with the thorax which is covered with brown hair. The most likely confusion species in Britain is Andrena scotica as this also has an early flight period but C. cunicularius is larger than A.scotica with longer antennae and does not have a fovea on the face. The males are smaller and paler than the females.

== Distribution ==
Colletes cunicularius is widespread in the Palearactic from Great Britain in the west to the Pacific coasts of Siberia and China in the east. In Great Britain it was restricted to the western coastal areas between south Wales and Cumbria but it has been expanding its range inland. As of 2015 it had recently colonised Jersey from the nearby continent and this may also be the source of Colletes cunicularius which have begun to breed in southern England.

== Habitat and ecology ==
Colletes cunicularius is a species associated with sparsely vegetated sandy areas, in Britain it was associated with large, mature coastal sand dunes which were near to areas where creeping willow (Salix repens) grows. Bees from Europe tended to be associated with alluvial area where rivers in flood has removed most of the vegetation and in both Britain and Europe this species has colonised man-made habitats such as sand pits. The British population was restricted to areas of dunes where it nests in erosion hollows within old dunes. It is univoltine, i.e. there is one generation per year, and it has a flight period of March to May, sometimes into June, which is earlier than most other species of Colletes.

C. cunicularius forages from a wide variety of flowers but in Great Britain, the most important is creeping willow with other species of Salix being used if creeping willow is not present. Elsewhere it is much more catholic in the plants it forages from, although in Finland it has also been reported as mainly specialising on willows while in Italy at was recorded as specialising in pollinating species in the family Fabaceae. The male C. cunicularius are the only species which pollinate two species of sexually deceptive orchids which mimic females bees Ophrys exaltata and Ophrys arachntiiformis, although they have been recorded as attempting to pseudocopulating with other species in the genus Ophrys.

A male of the solitary bee Colletes cunicularius pseudocopulating on the flower labellum of the orchid Ophrys lupercalis - 1471-2148-10-103-S1

To create the nest the female excavates a tunnel into the sand of around 45–55 centimetres (18–22 in) in length which is slightly sloping and has a number of side tunnels towards the deepest part of the tunnel each with a cell at the end. The adult males emerge from the upper cells en masse a day before the females, normally in the afternoon. The brood cells are lined with a cellophane-like membrane that is waterproof, has antifungal properties, and is thought to aid in the maintenance of the appropriate level of humidity as the bee's larvae develop. The membrane is made from a liquid secreted by the Dufour's gland and the female bee uses her short, two-pronged tongue like a paintbrush to smear the oily secretion around the walls of the cells, it then dries into the clear membrane. The females often nest together in large, and noisy, aggregations and when the females first emerge from their cells "mating balls" can be formed as many males try to mate with a single newly emerged female.

In Britain this species has no known parasites but on continental Europe the cuckoo bee Sphecodes albilabris is a cleptoparasite of this species. and the blister beetle Apalus bimaculatus is also recorded as a nest parasite.

== Subspecies ==
The population of C. cunicularius in western Britain is morphologically and biologically distinct from the continental populations and have been given subspecific status as C. c. celticus. The chemistry of the secretions of the Dufour's gland have also now been shown to be distinctive in the British subspecies too.
