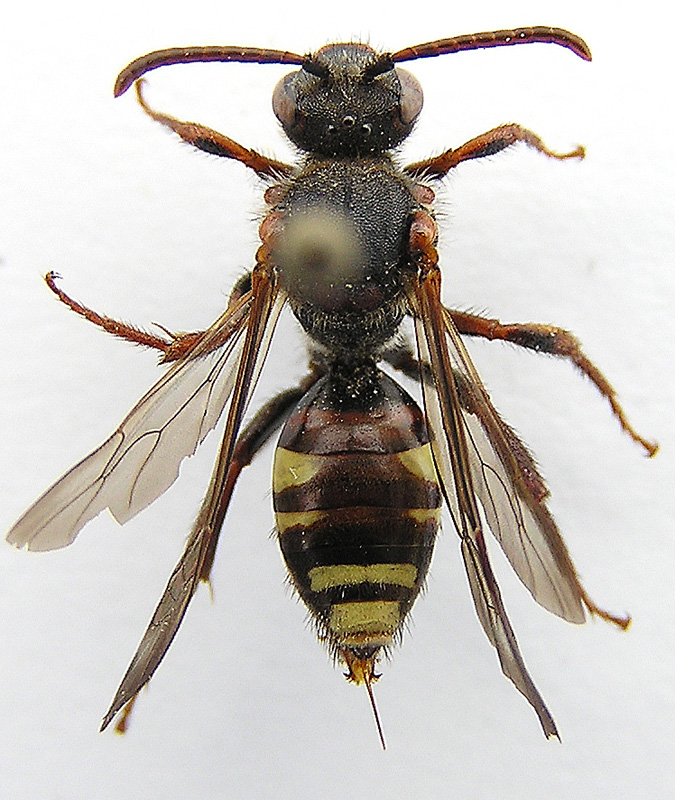

Scientific classification
- Kingdom: Animalia
- Phylum: Arthropoda
- Clade: Pancrustacea
- Class: Insecta
- Order: Hymenoptera
- Family: Apidae
- Subfamily: Nomadinae
- Tribe: Nomadini
- Genus: Nomada
- Species: N. leucophthalma

Binomial name
- Nomada leucophthalma (Kirby, 1802)

= Nomada leucophthalma =

Species of bee

Nomada leucophthalma is a Palearctic species of nomad bee.
