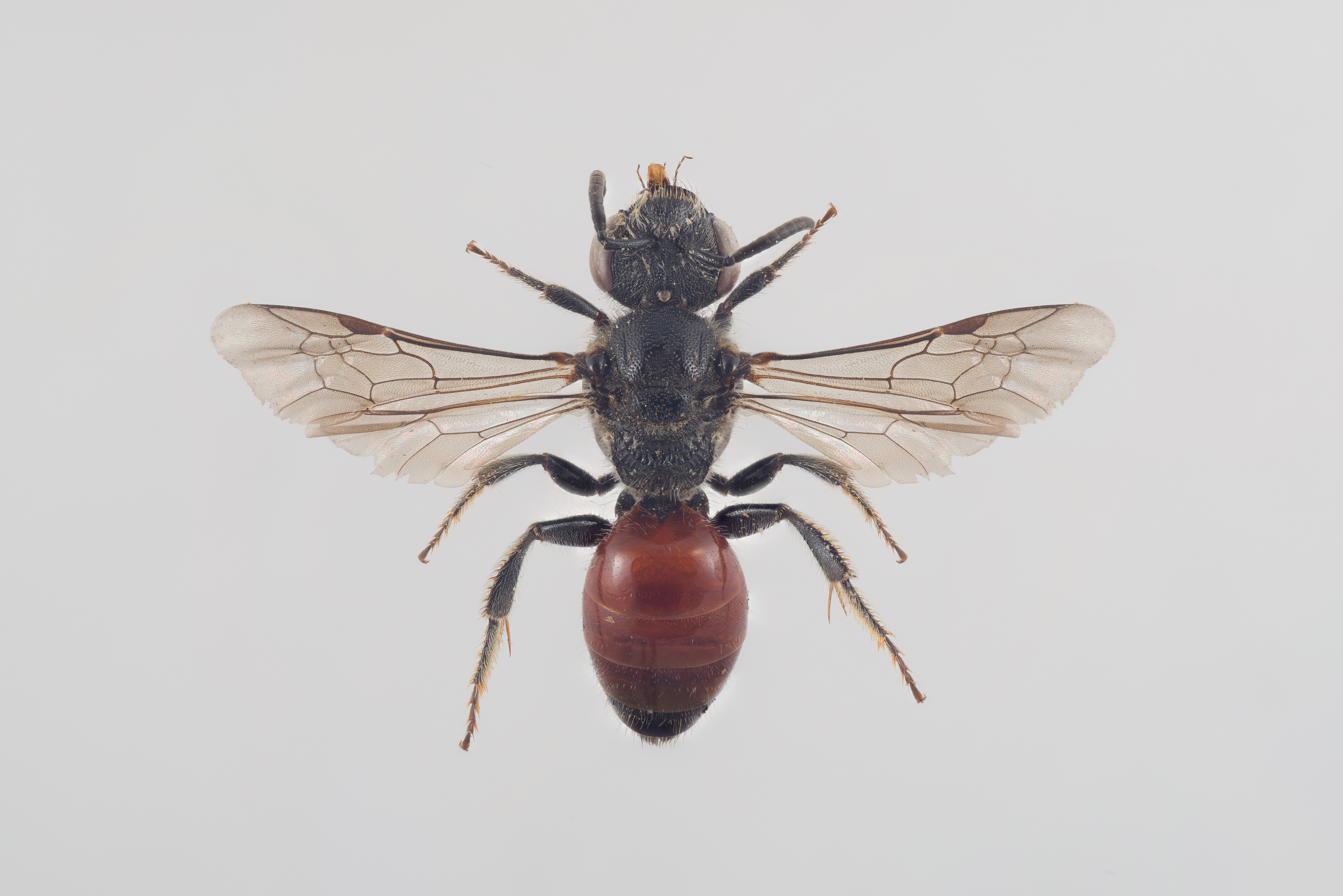
- Sphecodes pellucidus Norway

Scientific classification
- Domain: Eukaryota
- Kingdom: Animalia
- Phylum: Arthropoda
- Class: Insecta
- Order: Hymenoptera
- Family: Halictidae
- Subfamily: Halictinae
- Genus: Sphecodes
- Species: S. pellucidus

Binomial name
- Sphecodes pellucidus Smith, 1845

= Sphecodes pellucidus =

Species of bee

Sphecodes pellucidus is a Palearctic species of sweat bee.
