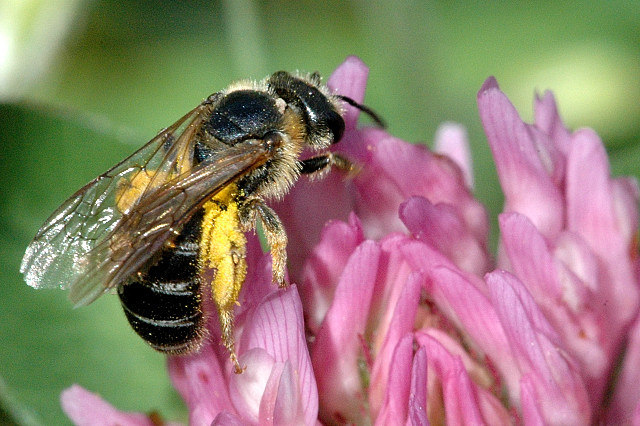

Scientific classification
- Kingdom: Animalia
- Phylum: Arthropoda
- Class: Insecta
- Order: Hymenoptera
- Family: Halictidae
- Tribe: Halictini
- Genus: Halictus
- Species: H. maculatus

Binomial name
- Halictus maculatus Smith, 1848

= Halictus maculatus =

Species of bee

Halictus maculatus is a species of insects belonging to the family Halictidae.

It is native to Europe and Eurasia.
