= List of Hymenoptera (Apocrita) of Ireland =

This article contains a list of Hymenoptera Apocrita of Ireland.

== Family Dryinidae ==
- Anteon arcuatum Kieffer 1905
- Anteon brachycerum (Dalman 1823)
- Anteon ephippiger (Dalman 1818)
- Anteon flavicorne (Dalman 1818)
- Anteon fulviventre (Haliday 1828)
- Anteon gaullei Kieffer 1905
- Anteon infectum (Haliday 1837)
- Anteon jurineanum Latreille 1809
- Anteon pubicorne (Dalman 1818)
- Anteon tripartitum (Kieffer 1905)
- Aphelopus atratus (Dalman 1823)
- Aphelopus melaleucus (Dalman 1818)
- Aphelopus nigriceps Kieffer 1905
- Aphelopus serratus Richards 1939
- Gonatopus bicolor (Haliday 1828)
- Gonatopus clavipes (Thunberg 1827)
- Gonatopus distinguendus Kieffer 1905
- Gonatopus striatus Kieffer 1905
- Lonchodryinus ruficornis (Dalman 1818)

== Family Bethylidae ==
- Bethylus fuscicornis (Jurine 1807)
- Cephalonomia waterstoni Gahan 1931

== Family Chrysididae (cuckoo wasps) ==
- Pseudomalus auratus (Linnaeus, 1758)
- Chrysis mediata Linsenmaier, 1951
- Chrysis ignita Linnaeus, 1758
- Chrysis rutiliventris Abeille de Perrin, 1879

== Family Tiphiidae (tiphiid wasps) ==
- Tiphia minuta Linden 1827

== Family Mutillidae (velvet ants) ==
- Myrmosa atra Panzer, 1801

== Family Formicidae (ants) ==
- Formica aquilonia Yarrow, 1955
- Formica lugubris Zetterstedt 1838
- Formica fusca Linnaeus 1758
- Formica lemani Bondroit 1917
- Hypoponera punctatissima (Roger 1859)
- Lasius flavus (Fabricius 1782)
- Lasius mixtus (Nylander 1846)
- Lasius umbratus (Nylander 1946)
- Lasius fuliginosus (Latreille 1798)
- Lasius alienus (Foerster 1850)
- Lasius niger (Linnaeus 1758)
- Lasius platythorax Seifert, 1991
- Leptothorax acervorum (Fabricius 1793)
- Monomorium pharaonis (Linnaeus 1758)
- Myrmica lobicornis Nylander 1846
- Myrmica rubra (Linnaeus 1758)
- Myrmica ruginodis Nylander 1846
- Myrmica sabuleti Meinert 1861
- Myrmica scabrinodis Nylander 1846
- Myrmica schencki Emery 1895
- Myrmica sulcinodis Nylander 1846
- Stenamma debile (Forster 1850)
- Stenamma westwoodi Westwood 1839
- Tetramorium caespitum (Linnaeus 1758)
- Tetramorium lucayanum Wheeler 1905

== Family Pompilidae (spider wasps) ==
=== Sub-family Ceropalinae ===
==== Genus Ceropales ====
- Ceropales maculata (Fabricius, 1775)

=== Sub-family Pepsinae ===
==== Genus Dipogon ====
- Dipogon variegatus (Linnaeus, 1758) Historic records

==== Genus Priocnemis ====
- Priocnemis perturbator (Harris, 1780)

=== Sub-family Pompilinae ===
==== Genus Anoplius ====
- Anoplius nigerrimus (Scopoli, 1763)

==== Genus Episyron ====
- Episyron rufipes (Linnaeus, 1758)

==== Genus Evagetes ====
- Evagetes crassicornis (Shuckard, 1835)

==== Genus Pompilus ====
- Pompilus cinereus (Fabricius, 1775)

== Family Vespidae ==
=== Subfamily Eumeninae (potter and mason wasps) ===
==== Genus Odynerus ====
===== Subgenus Odynerus =====
- Odynerus spinipes (Linnaeus, 1758) Historic records

==== Genus Ancistrocerus ====
- Ancistrocerus antilope (Panzer 1798)
- Ancistrocerus gazella (Panzer 1798)
- Ancistrocerus nigricornis (Curtis 1826)
- Ancistrocerus oviventris (Wesmael 1836)
- Ancistrocerus parietinus (Linnaeus 1761)
- Ancistrocerus scoticus (Curtis 1826)
- Ancistrocerus trifasciatus (Muller 1776)

==== Genus Symmorphus ====
- Symmorphus bifasciatus (Linnaeus 1761)

=== Subfamily Vespinae (social wasps) ===
==== Genus Dolichovespula ====
- Dolichovespula norwegica (Fabricius, 1781)
- Dolichovespula saxonica (Fabricius, 1793)

===== Subgenus Pseudovespula =====
- Dolichovespula sylvestris (Scopoli, 1763)

==== Genus Vespula (typical social wasps) ====
===== Subgenus Vespula =====
- Vespula austriaca (Panzer, 1799)
- Vespula rufa (Linnaeus, 1758)

===== Subgenus Paravespula =====
- Vespula germanica (Fabricius, 1793)
- Vespula vulgaris (Linnaeus, 1758)

== Family Sphecidae ==
=== Genus Ammophila ===
- Ammophila sabulosa (Linnaeus 1758)

=== Genus Podalonia ===
- Podalonia affinis (W. Kirby 1798)
- Podalonia hirsuta (Scopoli 1763)

== Family Crabronidae ==
=== Genus Argogorytes ===
- Argogorytes mystaceus (Linnaeus 1761)

=== Genus Astata ===
- Astata boops (Schrank 1781)

=== Genus Crabro ===
- Crabro peltarius (Schreber 1784)

=== Genus Crossocerus ===
- Crossocerus capitosus (Shuckard 1837)
- Crossocerus cetratus (Shuckard 1837)
- Crossocerus dimidiatus (Fabricius 1781)
- Crossocerus elongatulus (Vander Linden 1829)
- Crossocerus exiguus (Vander Linden 1829)
- Crossocerus megacephalus (Rossi 1790)
- Crossocerus nigritus (Lepeletier & Brullé 1835)
- Crossocerus palmipes (Linnaeus 1767)
- Crossocerus podagricus (Vander Linden 1829)
- Crossocerus quadrimaculatus (Fabricius 1793)
- Crossocerus styrius (Kohl 1892)
- Crossocerus tarsatus (Shuckard 1837)
- Crossocerus varus Lepeletier & Brullé 1835
- Crossocerus walkeri (Shuckard 1837)
- Crossocerus wesmaeli (Vander Linden 1829)

=== Genus Ectemnius ===
- Ectemnius cavifrons (Thomson 1870)
- Ectemnius cephalotes (Olivier 1792)
- Ectemnius continuus (Fabricius 1804)
- Ectemnius lapidarius (Panzer 1804)
- Ectemnius ruficornis (Zetterstedt 1838)

=== Genus Lindenius ===
- Lindenius albilabris (Fabricius 1793)

=== Genus Mellinus ===
- Mellinus arvensis (Linnaeus 1758)

=== Genus Mimumesa ===
- Mimumesa littoralis (Bondroit 1934)
- Mimumesa unicolor (Vander Linden 1829)

=== Genus Nysson ===
- Nysson spinosus (J. Forster 1771)

=== Genus Oxybelus ===
- Oxybelus uniglumis (Linnaeus 1758)

=== Genus Passaloecus ===
- Passaloecus insignis (Vander Linden 1829)
- Passaloecus monilicornis Dahlbom 1842

=== Genus Pemphredon ===
- Pemphredon inornata Say 1824
- Pemphredon lethifer (Shuckard 1837)
- Pemphredon lugubris (Fabricius 1793)
- Pemphredon rugifer (Dahlbom 1844)

=== Genus Psenulus ===
- Psenulus pallipes (Panzer 1798)

=== Genus Rhopalum ===
- Rhopalum clavipes (Linnaeus 1758)
- Rhopalum coarctatum (Scopoli 1763)

=== Genus Spilomena ===
- Spilomena troglodytes (Vander Linden 1829)

=== Genus Tachysphex ===
- Tachysphex pompiliformis (Panzer 1805)

=== Genus Trypoxylon ===
- Trypoxylon attenuatum F. Smith 1851
- Trypoxylon clavicerum Lepeletier & Serville 1828

== Family Colletidae ==
=== Genus Colletes (plasterer bees) ===
- Colletes daviesanus Smith, 1846
- Colletes floralis Eversmann, 1852
- Colletes fodiens (Geoffroy, 1785)
- Colletes similis Schenk, 1853
- Colletes succinctus (Linnaeus, 1758)

=== Genus Hylaeus ===
- Hylaeus brevicornis Nylander, 1852
- Hylaeus communis Nylander, 1852
- Hylaeus confusus Nylander, 1852
- Hylaeus hyalinatus Smith, 1842

== Family Andrenidae (mining bees) ==
=== Genus Andrena (mining bee) ===
- Andrena angustior (Kirby, 1802)
- Andrena apicata Smith, 1847
- Andrena barbilabris (Kirby, 1802)
- Andrena bicolor Fabricius, 1775
- Andrena carantonica Perez, 1902
- Andrena cineraria (Linnaeus, 1758)
- Andrena clarkella (Kirby, 1802)
- Andrena coitana (Kirby, 1802)
- Andrena denticulata (Kirby, 1802)
- Andrena fucata Smith, 1847
- Andrena fulva (Müller, 1766)
- Andrena fuscipes (Kirby, 1802)
- Andrena haemorrhoa (Fabricius, 1781)
- Andrena hattorfiana (Fabricius, 1775)
- Andrena helvola (Linnaeus, 1758)
- Andrena humilis Imhoff, 1832
- Andrena lapponica Zetterstedt, 1838
- Andrena marginata Fabricius, 1777
- Andrena minutula (Kirby, 1802)
- Andrena nigroaenea (Kirby, 1802)
- Andrena ovatula (Kirby, 1802)
- Andrena pilipes s.s. Fabricius, 1781
- Andrena praecox (Scopoli, 1763)
- Andrena rosae Panzer, 1801
- Andrena semilaevis Perez, 1903
- Andrena stragulata Illiger, 1806
- Andrena subopaca Nylander, 1848
- Andrena tarsata Nylander, 1848
- Andrena trimmerana (Kirby, 1802)
- Andrena wilkella (Kirby, 1802)

== Family Halictidae (sweat bees) ==
=== Genus Halictus ===
- Halictus rubicundus (Christ, 1791)
- Halictus tumulorum (Linnaeus, 1758)

=== Genus Lasioglossum ===
- Lasioglossum albipes (Fabricius, 1781)
- Lasioglossum calceatum (Scopoli, 1763)
- Lasioglossum cupromicans (Pérez, 1903)
- Lasioglossum fratellum (Pérez, 1903)
- Lasioglossum lativentre (Schenck, 1853)
- Lasioglossum leucopus (Kirby, 1802)
- Lasioglossum nitidiusculum (Kirby, 1802)
- Lasioglossum punctatissimum (Schenck, 1853)
- Lasioglossum rufitarse (Zetterstedt, 1838)
- Lasioglossum smeathmanellum (Kirby, 1802)
- Lasioglossum villosulum (Kirby, 1802)

=== Genus Sphecodes ===
- Sphecodes crassus Thomson, 1870
- Sphecodes ephippius (Linnaeus, 1767)
- Sphecodes ferruginatus von Hagens, 1882
- Sphecodes geoffrellus (Kirby, 1802)
- Sphecodes gibbus (Linnaeus 1785)
- Sphecodes hyalinatus von Hagens, 1882
- Sphecodes monilicornis (Kirby, 1802)
- Sphecodes pellucidus Smith, F., 1845

== Family Megachilidae ==
=== Genus Osmia (mason bee) ===
- Osmia aurulenta (Panzer, 1799)
- Osmia rufa (Linnaeus, 1758)

=== Genus Megachile (leafcutter bees) ===
- Megachile centuncularis Linnaeus 1758
- Megachile circumcincta Kirby 1802
- Megachile ligniseca Kirby 1802
- Megachile maritima Kirby 1802
- Megachile versicolor Smith 1844
- Megachile willughbiella Kirby 1802

=== Genus Coelioxys (leaf-cutting cuckoo bees, sharp-tailed bees) ===
- Coelioxys elongata Lepeletier, 1841
- Coelioxys inermis Kirby, 1802

== Family Apidae ==
=== Genus Nomada ===
- Nomada argentata Herrich-Schäffer, 1839
- Nomada fabriciana (Linnaeus, 1767)
- Nomada flavoguttata (Kirby, 1802)
- Nomada goodeniana (Kirby, 1802)
- Nomada leucophthalma (Kirby, 1802)
- Nomada marshamella (Kirby, 1802)
- Nomada obtusifrons Nylander, 1848
- Nomada panzeri Lepeletier, 1841
- Nomada ruficornis (Linnaeus, 1758)
- Nomada rufipes Fabricius, 1793
- Nomada sheppardana (Kirby, 1802)
- Nomada striata Fabricius, 1793

=== Genus Bombus (bumblebees) ===
==== Subgenus Bombus ====
- Bombus cryptarum (Fabricius, 1775)
- Bombus lucorum Linnaeus, 1761
- Bombus terrestris (Linnaeus, 1758)
- Bombus magnus Vogt, 1911

==== Subgenus Megabombus ====
- Bombus (Megabombus) hortorum Linnaeus, 1761

==== Subgenus Melanobombus ====
- Bombus (Melanobombus) lapidarius (Linnaeus, 1758)

==== Subgenus Psithyrus ====
- Bombus (Psithyrus) barbutellus (Kirby, 1802)
- Bombus (Psithyrus) bohemicus Seidl, 1838
- Bombus (Psithyrus) campestris (Panzer, 1801)
- Bombus (Psithyrus) rupestris (Fabricius, 1793)
- Bombus (Psithyrus) sylvestris (Lepeletier, 1833)
- Bombus (Psithyrus) vestalis Geoffroy, 1785

==== Subgenus Pyrobombus ====
- Bombus (Pyrobombus) jonellus (Kirby, 1802)
- Bombus (Pyrobombus) monticola Smith, 1849
- Bombus (Pyrobombus) pratorum (Linnaeus, 1761)
- Bombus (Pyrobombus) hypnorum Linnaeus, 1758

==== Subgenus Subterraneobombus ====
- Bobus (Subterraneobombus) distinguendus Morawitz, 1869

==== Subgenus Thoracombus ====
- Bombus (Thoracombus) muscorum (Linnaeus, 1758)
- Bombus (Thoracombus) pascuorum (Scopoli, 1763)
- Bombus (Thoracombus) ruderarius (Müller, 1776)
- Bombus (Thoracombus) sylvarum (Linnaeus, 1761)

=== Genus Apis (honey bees) ===
- Apis mellifera, western honey bee (Linnaeus, 1758)
