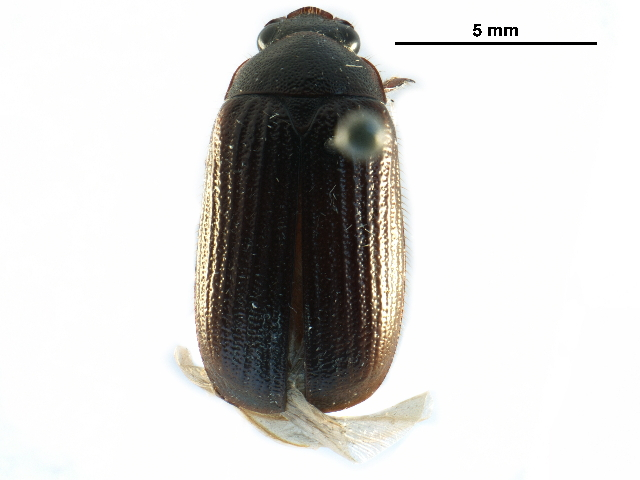

Scientific classification
- Kingdom: Animalia
- Phylum: Arthropoda
- Class: Insecta
- Order: Coleoptera
- Suborder: Polyphaga
- Infraorder: Scarabaeiformia
- Family: Scarabaeidae
- Genus: Serica
- Species: S. atracapilla

Binomial name
- Serica atracapilla (Kirby, 1837)

Synonyms
- Camptorhina atracapilla Kirby, 1837; Serica cucullata Dawson, 1947

= Serica atracapilla =

Species of beetle

Serica atracapilla is a species of scarab beetle in the family Scarabaeidae. It is found in North America, where it has been recorded from Alabama, Connecticut, Florida, Georgia, Illinois, Maine, Maryland, Michigan, Minnesota, New Hampshire, New Jersey, New York, North Carolina, North Dakota, Pennsylvania, Vermont, Virginia, Wisconsin, Tennessee, Manitoba, New Brunswick, Nova Scotia, Ontario, Prince Edward Island, Quebec and Saskatchewan.

== Description ==
Adults reach a length of about 10 mm. The colour is chestnut-brown. The upper surface is bare, polished and shining, without any trace of sericeous or pruinose luster.
