= Harpalus ochropus =

Scientific classification
- Kingdom: Animalia
- Phylum: Arthropoda
- Class: Insecta
- Order: Coleoptera
- Suborder: Adephaga
- Family: Carabidae
- Genus: Harpalus
- Species: H. ochropus

Binomial name
- Harpalus ochropus Kirby, 1837

Species of beetle

Harpalus ochropus is a species of ground beetle in the subfamily Harpalinae. It was described by William Kirby in 1837. It is found in North America, including Canada and the United States.
