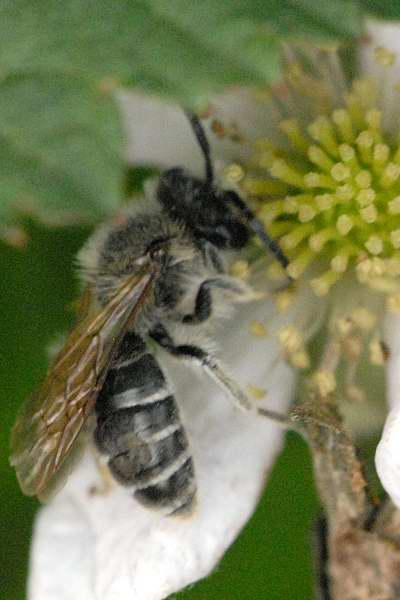
- Andrena ovatula Ardennes

Scientific classification
- Domain: Eukaryota
- Kingdom: Animalia
- Phylum: Arthropoda
- Class: Insecta
- Order: Hymenoptera
- Family: Andrenidae
- Genus: Andrena
- Species: A. ovatula

Binomial name
- Andrena ovatula (Kirby, 1802)

= Andrena ovatula =

Species of bee

Andrena ovatula is a Palearctic species of mining bee.
