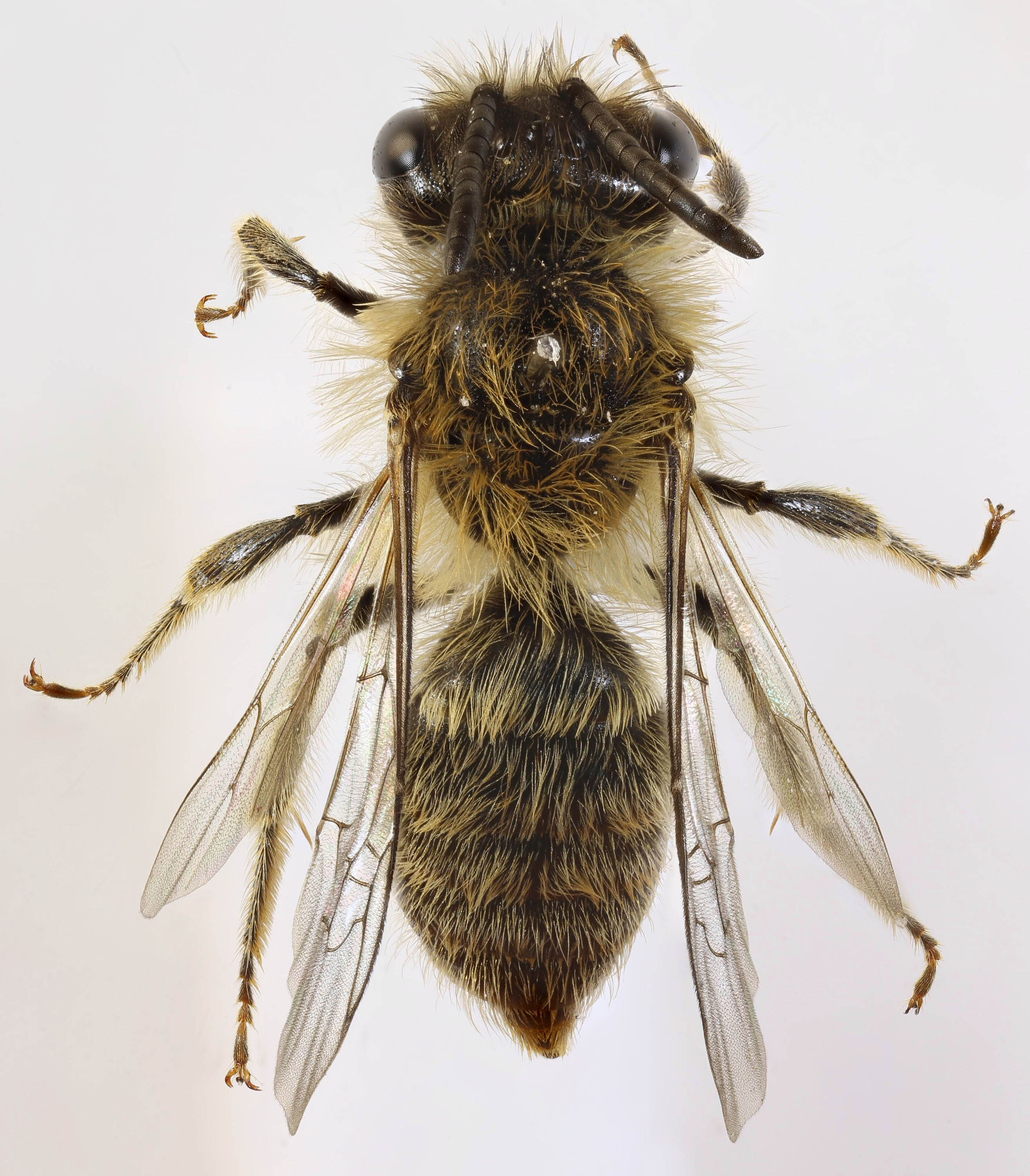
- Andrena fuscipes, Maentwrog, North Wales

Scientific classification
- Domain: Eukaryota
- Kingdom: Animalia
- Phylum: Arthropoda
- Class: Insecta
- Order: Hymenoptera
- Family: Andrenidae
- Genus: Andrena
- Species: A. fuscipes

Binomial name
- Andrena fuscipes (Kirby, 1802)

= Andrena fuscipes =

Species of bee

Andrena fuscipes is a Palearctic species of mining bee.
