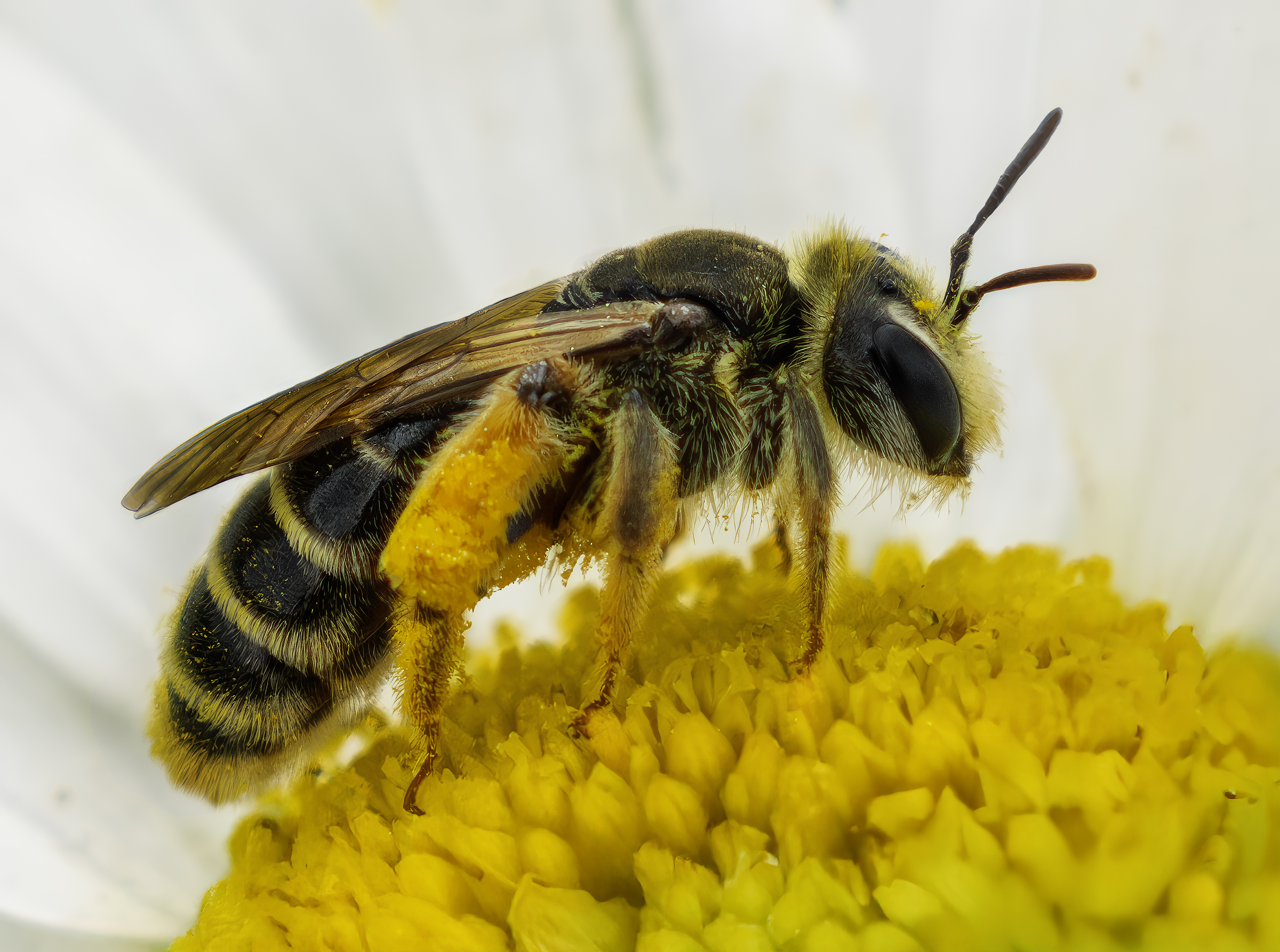

Scientific classification
- Domain: Eukaryota
- Kingdom: Animalia
- Phylum: Arthropoda
- Class: Insecta
- Order: Hymenoptera
- Family: Andrenidae
- Genus: Andrena
- Species: A. wilkella

Binomial name
- Andrena wilkella (Kirby, 1802)

= Andrena wilkella =

Species of bee

Andrena wilkella, also known as Wilke's mining bee, is a species of miner bee in the family Andrenidae. Its original distribution is Europe. It has been accidentally introduced to North America long ago, possibly with ship ballast. It is active between April and August. Andrena wilkella has been recorded to nest both singly and in aggregations. Andrena wilkella preferentially collects pollen from Fabaceae including clover and sweet clover.

The body length of the female is 10–12 mm, and the male is 9–11 mm.

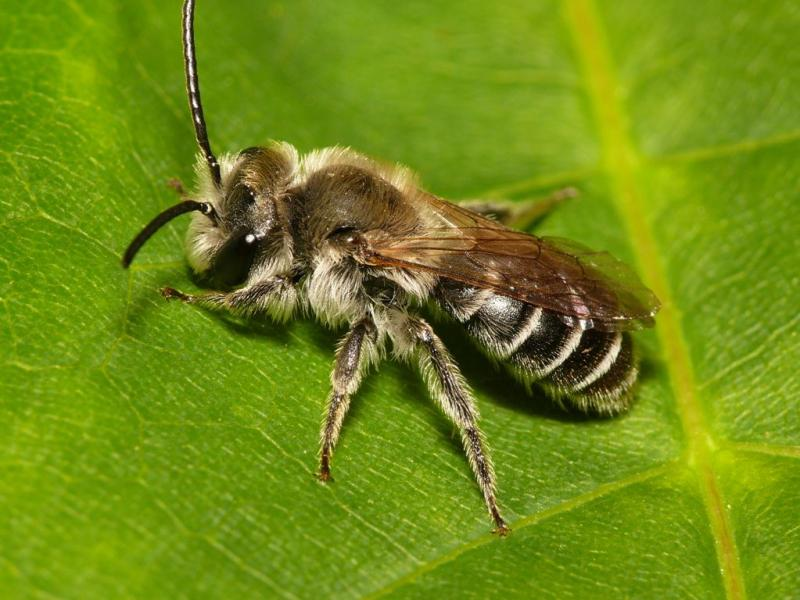
