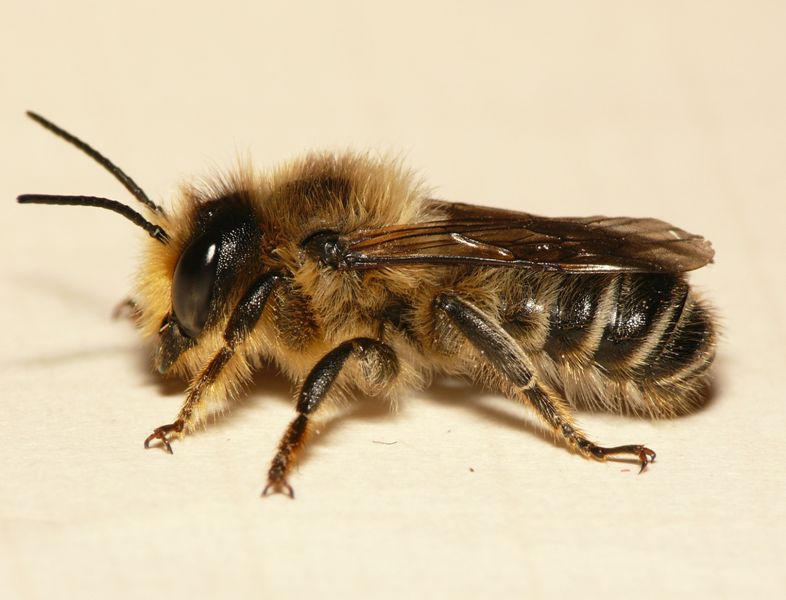

Scientific classification
- Domain: Eukaryota
- Kingdom: Animalia
- Phylum: Arthropoda
- Class: Insecta
- Order: Hymenoptera
- Family: Megachilidae
- Genus: Megachile
- Species: M. ligniseca

Binomial name
- Megachile ligniseca (Kirby, 1802)

= Megachile ligniseca =

Species of leafcutter bee (Megachile)

Megachile ligniseca is a species of bee in the family Megachilidae. It was described by William Kirby in 1802.
