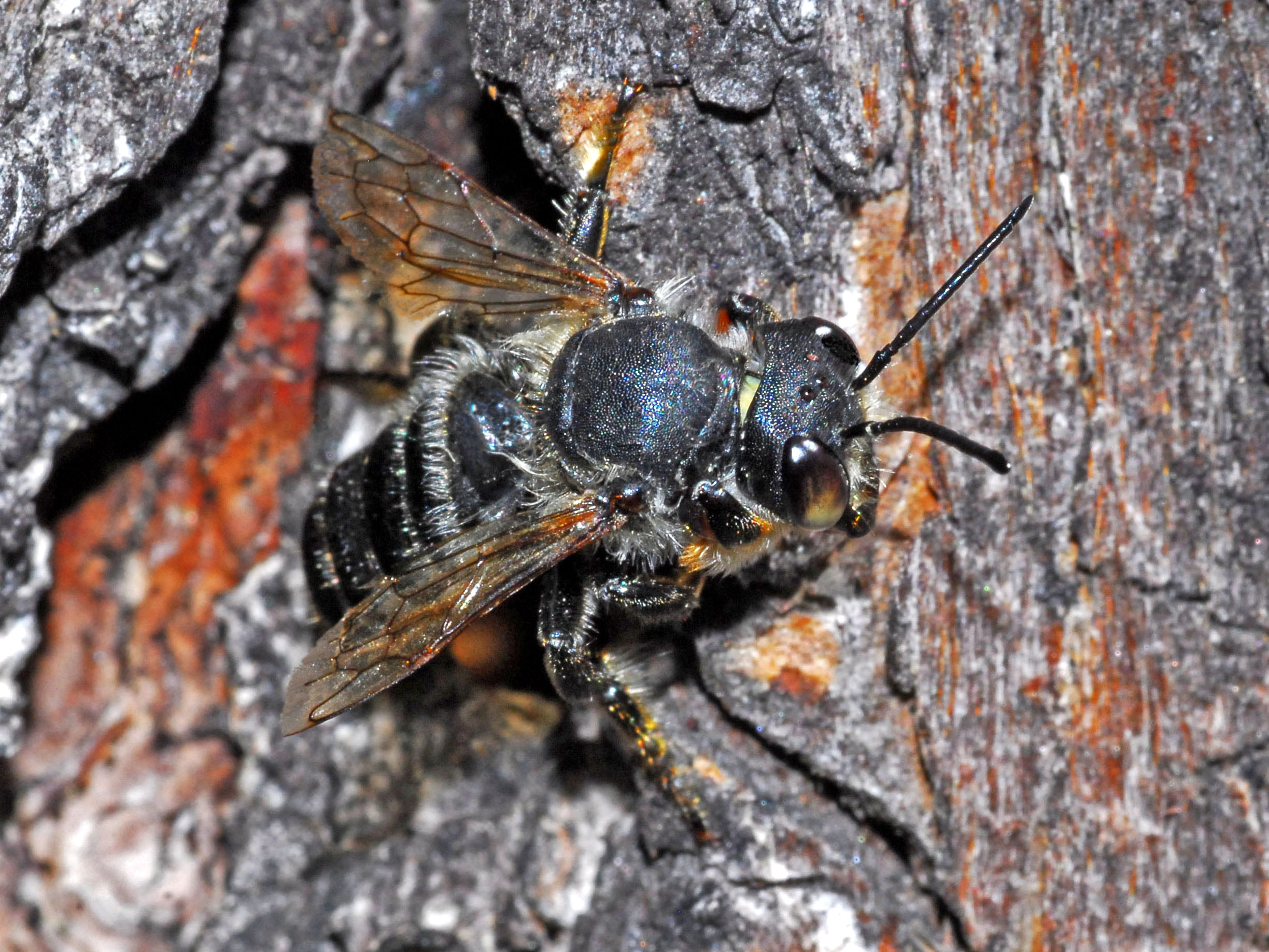
- Megachile maritima. Male

Scientific classification
- Domain: Eukaryota
- Kingdom: Animalia
- Phylum: Arthropoda
- Class: Insecta
- Order: Hymenoptera
- Family: Megachilidae
- Genus: Megachile
- Species: M. maritima

Binomial name
- Megachile maritima (Kirby, 1802)

Synonyms
- Apis maritima Kirby, 1802; Megachile (Xanthosarus) maritima kashgarensis Cockerell, 1913; Megachile (Xanthosarus) maritima mandschurica Hedicke, 1940; Megachile flaviventris Schenck, 1853; Megachile fulvescens Smith, 1853; Megachile kashgarensis Cockerell, 1913; Megachile maritima continentalis Hedicke, 1938; Megachile maritima yamadai Yasumatsu, 1938; Phyllotoma manicata Dumeril, 1860

= Megachile maritima =

Species of leafcutter bee (Megachile)

Megachile maritima, common name coast leaf-cutter, is a species of leaf-cutter bees in the family Megachilidae. It was described by William Kirby in 1802.

== Distribution ==
This species is present in most of Europe (Austria, Belgium, United Kingdom, Czech Republic, Denmark, Finland, France, Germany, Hungary, Italy, Lithuania, European Russia, Poland, Slovakia, Slovenia, Spain and Switzerland), in the East Palaearctic realm and in the Oriental realm.

== Habitat ==
These leaf-cutter bees can be found on lowland heaths and on chalk grassland, but they mainly occur on the coast (hence the species name), on coastal dunes with light, sandy soil and on soft-rock cliffs.

== Description ==
Megachile maritima can reach a body length of about 9–10.5 mm (0.35–0.41 in), with a wing length of about 10 mm (0.39 in). Head and thorax of these robust, very large leaf-cutters bees are generally black, thickly and minutely punctured and rather hairy. Mandible are very large, with four terminal teeth. Antennae are filiform. The oblong-quadrate abdomen is covered with reddish hairs in fresh individuals, but in older specimen it turns to silvery black. Wings are transparent, darkened at the apex. Hind tibiae and tarsi are strongly swollen. Males have whitish and strongly expanded front tarsi and bushy hair on the front feet.

== Biology ==
Adults of this univoltine species fly from June to mid-August. They are used to collect pollen from flowers of Campanula trachelium, Centaurea nigra, Cirsium vulgare, Echium vulgare, Erica species, Eryngium maritimum, Heracleum sphondylium, Lotus corniculatus, Lotus pedunculatus, Ononis species, Reseda species, Rubus fruticosus and Senecio species.

The nest is usually excavated in the ground and the cells are made with cut sections of green leaves obtained from various plants (especially Salix species and Cynoglossum officinale).

This species appears to be parasitized by Coelioxys conoidea and Coelioxys mandibularis.
