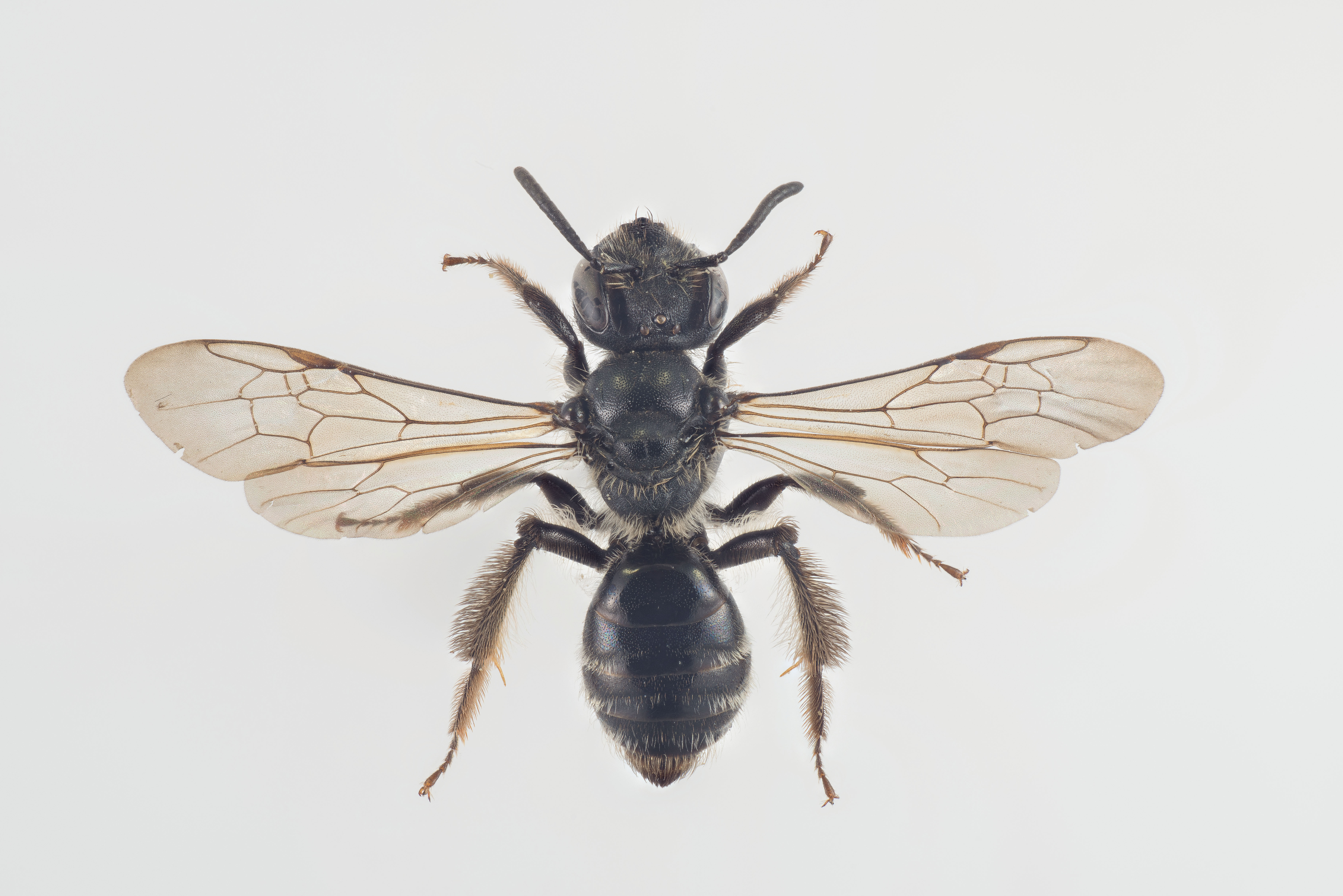

Scientific classification
- Kingdom: Animalia
- Phylum: Arthropoda
- Class: Insecta
- Order: Hymenoptera
- Family: Andrenidae
- Genus: Andrena
- Species: A. coitana

Binomial name
- Andrena coitana (Kirby, 1802)

= Andrena coitana =

Species of bee

Andrena coitana is a Palearctic species of mining bee inhabiting woodlands, wetlands and grasslands.
