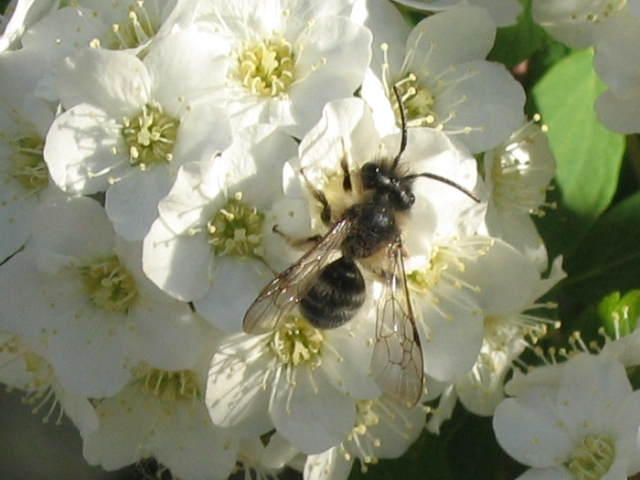
- Andrena angustior Madrid Spain

Scientific classification
- Domain: Eukaryota
- Kingdom: Animalia
- Phylum: Arthropoda
- Class: Insecta
- Order: Hymenoptera
- Family: Andrenidae
- Genus: Andrena
- Species: A. angustior

Binomial name
- Andrena angustior (Kirby, 1802)

= Andrena angustior =

Species of bee

Andrena angustior is a Palearctic species of mining bee.
