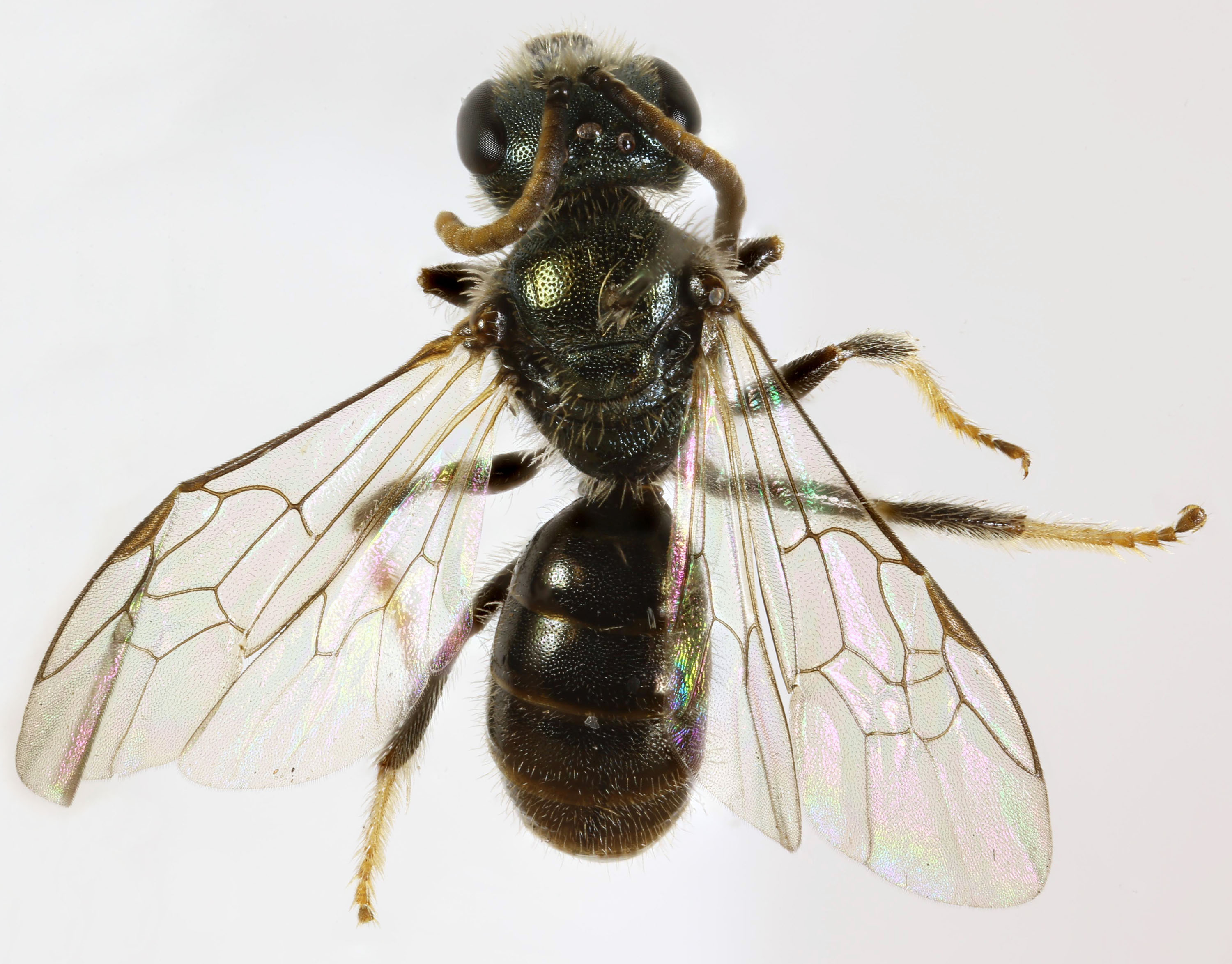
- Lasioglossum leucopus, Bagillt, North Wales

Scientific classification
- Domain: Eukaryota
- Kingdom: Animalia
- Phylum: Arthropoda
- Class: Insecta
- Order: Hymenoptera
- Family: Halictidae
- Subfamily: Halictinae
- Tribe: Halictini
- Genus: Lasioglossum
- Species: L. leucopus

Binomial name
- Lasioglossum leucopus (Kirby, 1802)

= Lasioglossum leucopus =

Species of bee

Lasioglossum leucopus is a Palearctic species of sweat bee.
