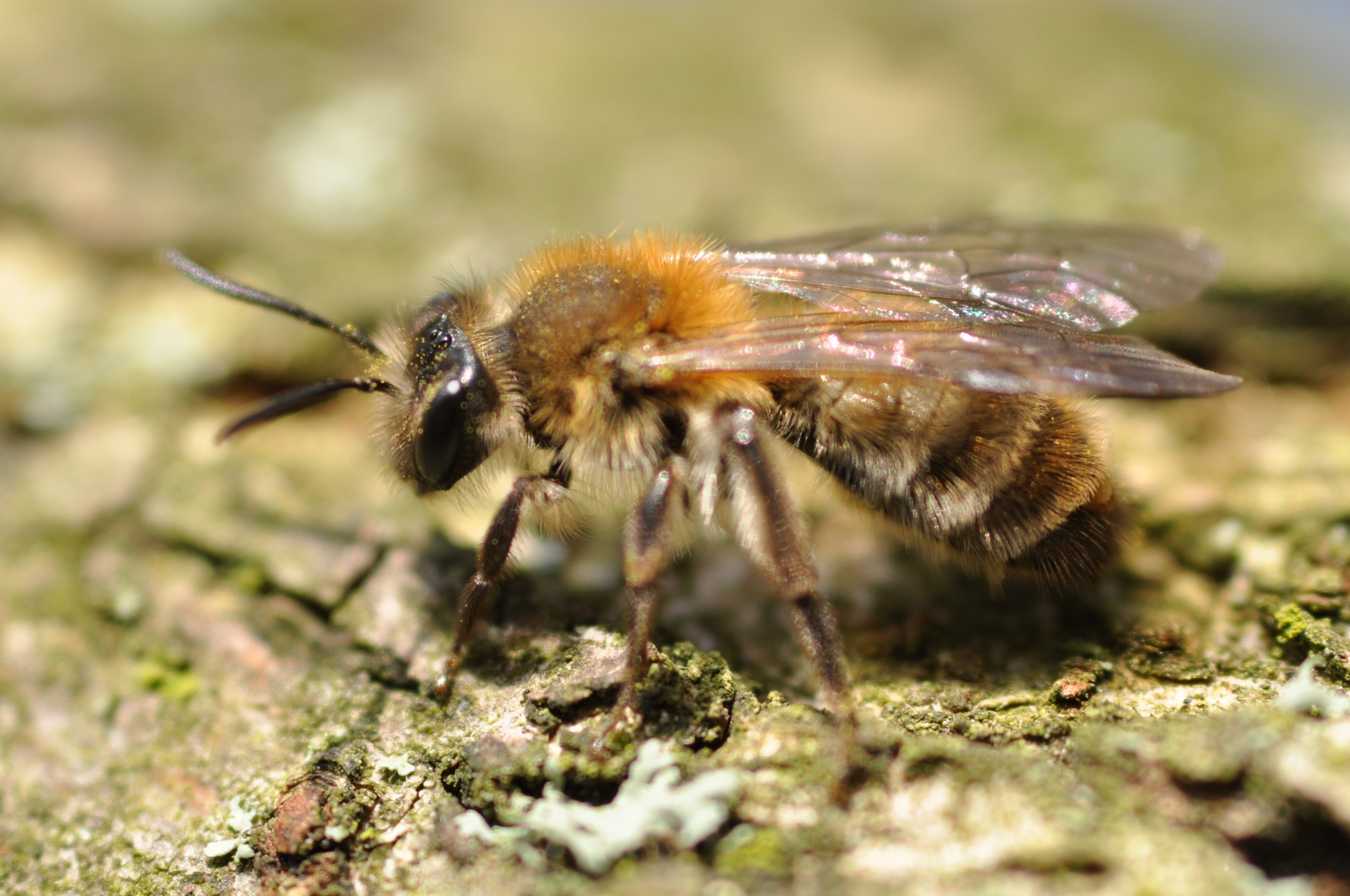
- Andrena praecox Kirchwerder Germany

Scientific classification
- Domain: Eukaryota
- Kingdom: Animalia
- Phylum: Arthropoda
- Class: Insecta
- Order: Hymenoptera
- Family: Andrenidae
- Genus: Andrena
- Species: A. praecox

Binomial name
- Andrena praecox (Scopoli, 1763)

= Andrena praecox =

Species of bee

Andrena praecox is a Palearctic species of mining bee.
