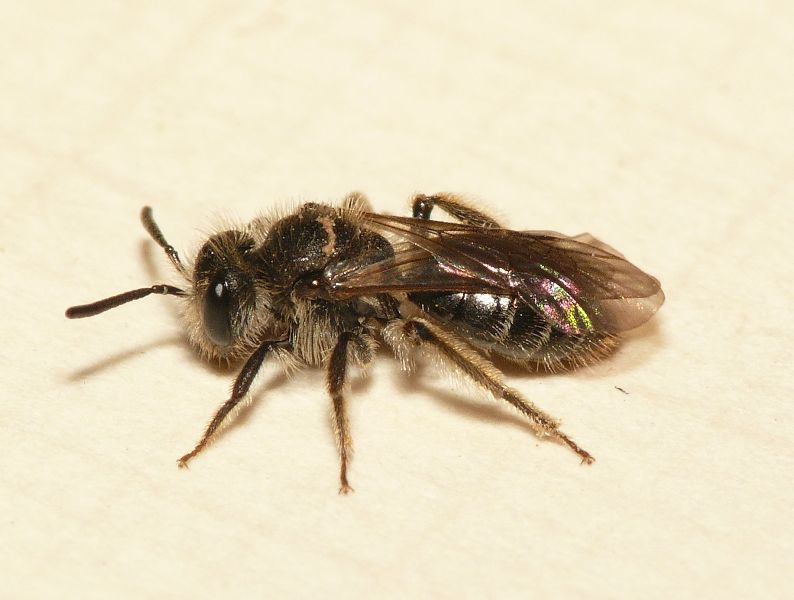
- Andrena subopaca Rhenen, the Netherlands

Scientific classification
- Kingdom: Animalia
- Phylum: Arthropoda
- Clade: Pancrustacea
- Class: Insecta
- Order: Hymenoptera
- Family: Andrenidae
- Genus: Andrena
- Species: A. subopaca

Binomial name
- Andrena subopaca Nylander, 1848

= Andrena subopaca =

Species of bee

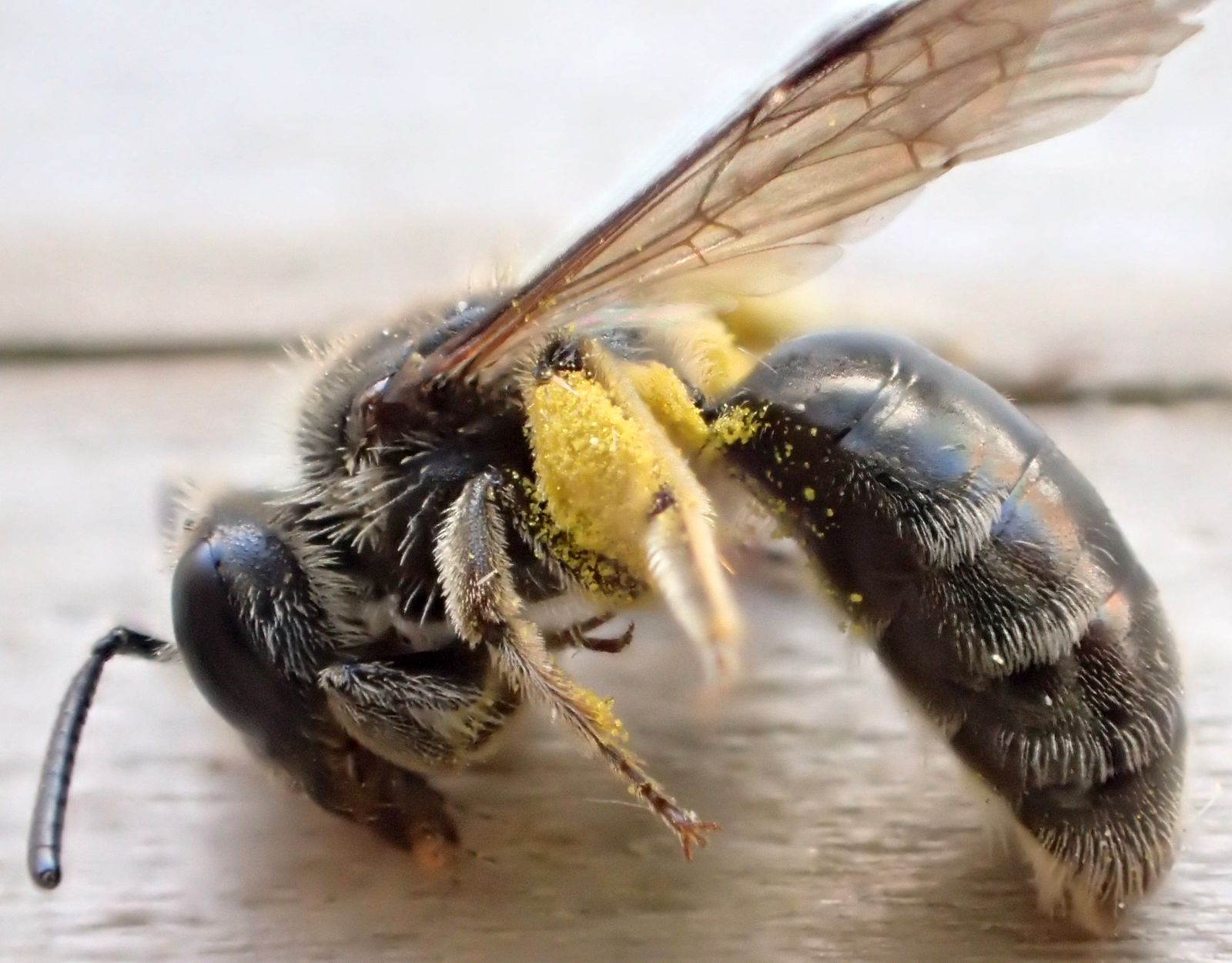
Andrena subopaca, female

Andrena subopaca is a Palearctic species of mining bee.
