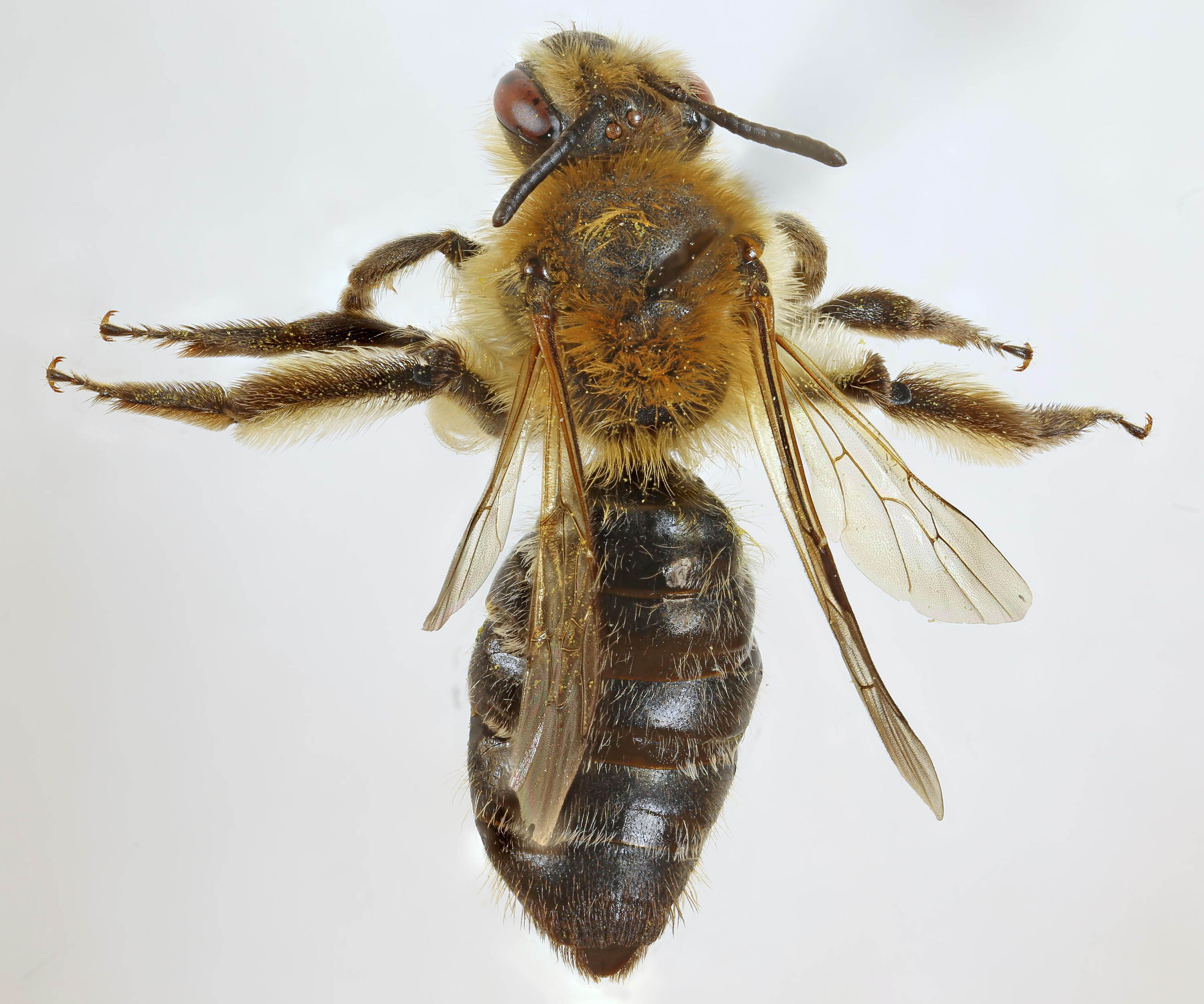
- Andrena fucata female, Llanfachraeth, North Wales

Scientific classification
- Domain: Eukaryota
- Kingdom: Animalia
- Phylum: Arthropoda
- Class: Insecta
- Order: Hymenoptera
- Family: Andrenidae
- Genus: Andrena
- Species: A. fucata

Binomial name
- Andrena fucata Smith, 1847

= Andrena fucata =

Species of bee

Andrena fucata is a Palearctic species of mining bee.
