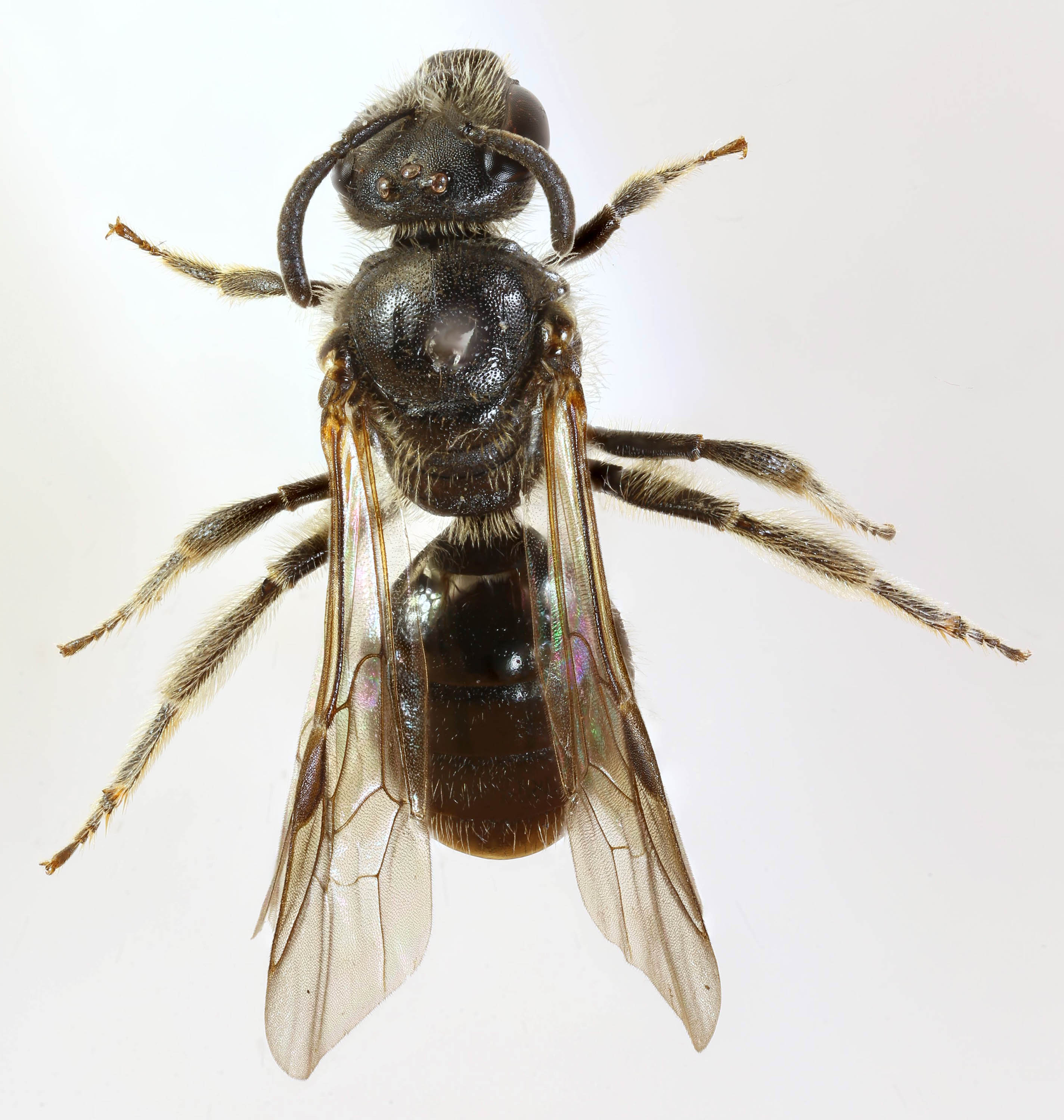
- Lasioglossum rufitarse, Minera, North Wales

Scientific classification
- Domain: Eukaryota
- Kingdom: Animalia
- Phylum: Arthropoda
- Class: Insecta
- Order: Hymenoptera
- Family: Halictidae
- Subfamily: Halictinae
- Tribe: Halictini
- Genus: Lasioglossum
- Species: L. rufitarse

Binomial name
- Lasioglossum rufitarse (Zetterstedt ,1838)

= Lasioglossum rufitarse =

Species of bee

Lasioglossum rufitarse is a Holarctic species of sweat bee.
