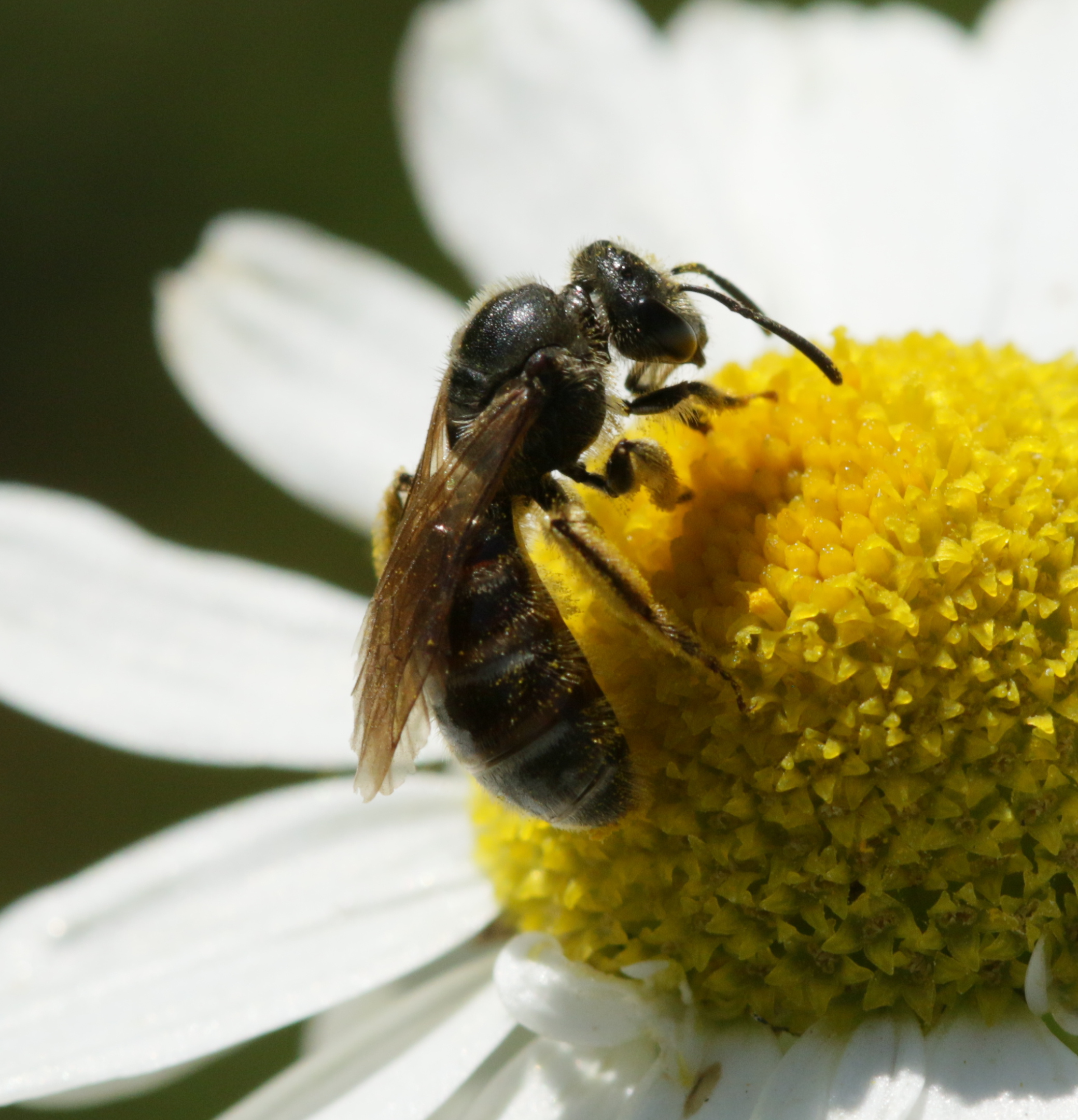
- Musselburgh, East Lothian, Scotland

Scientific classification
- Domain: Eukaryota
- Kingdom: Animalia
- Phylum: Arthropoda
- Class: Insecta
- Order: Hymenoptera
- Family: Halictidae
- Subfamily: Halictinae
- Tribe: Halictini
- Genus: Lasioglossum
- Species: L. calceatum

Binomial name
- Lasioglossum calceatum (Scopoli, 1763)

= Lasioglossum calceatum =

Species of bee

Lasioglossum calceatum is a Palearctic species of sweat bee. The species is socially polymorphic, with northern populations being solitary while southern populations exhibit eusocial behavior.
