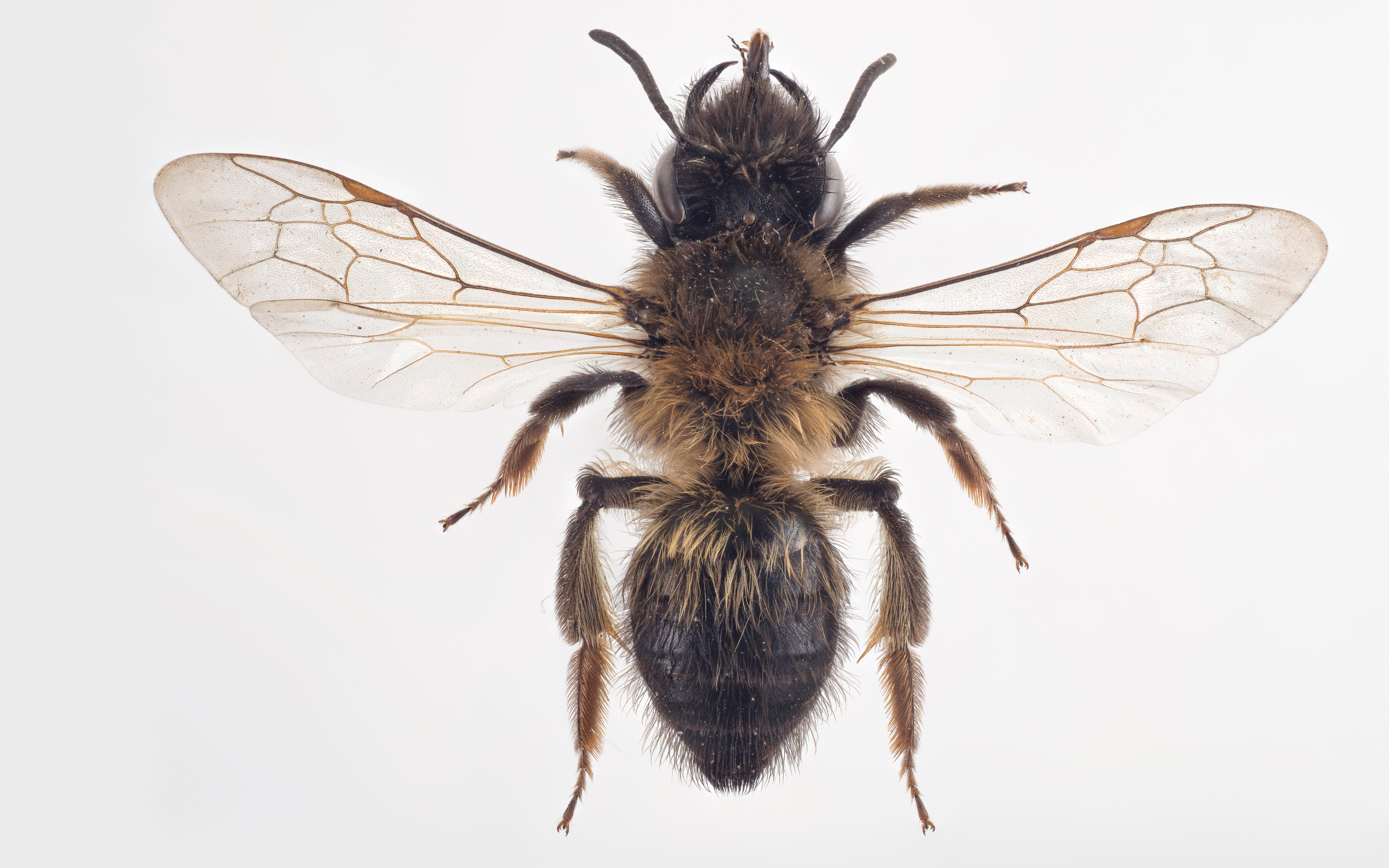

Scientific classification
- Domain: Eukaryota
- Kingdom: Animalia
- Phylum: Arthropoda
- Class: Insecta
- Order: Hymenoptera
- Family: Andrenidae
- Genus: Andrena
- Species: A. apicata

Binomial name
- Andrena apicata Smith, 1847

= Andrena apicata =

Species of bee

Andrena apicata is a Palearctic species of mining bee.
