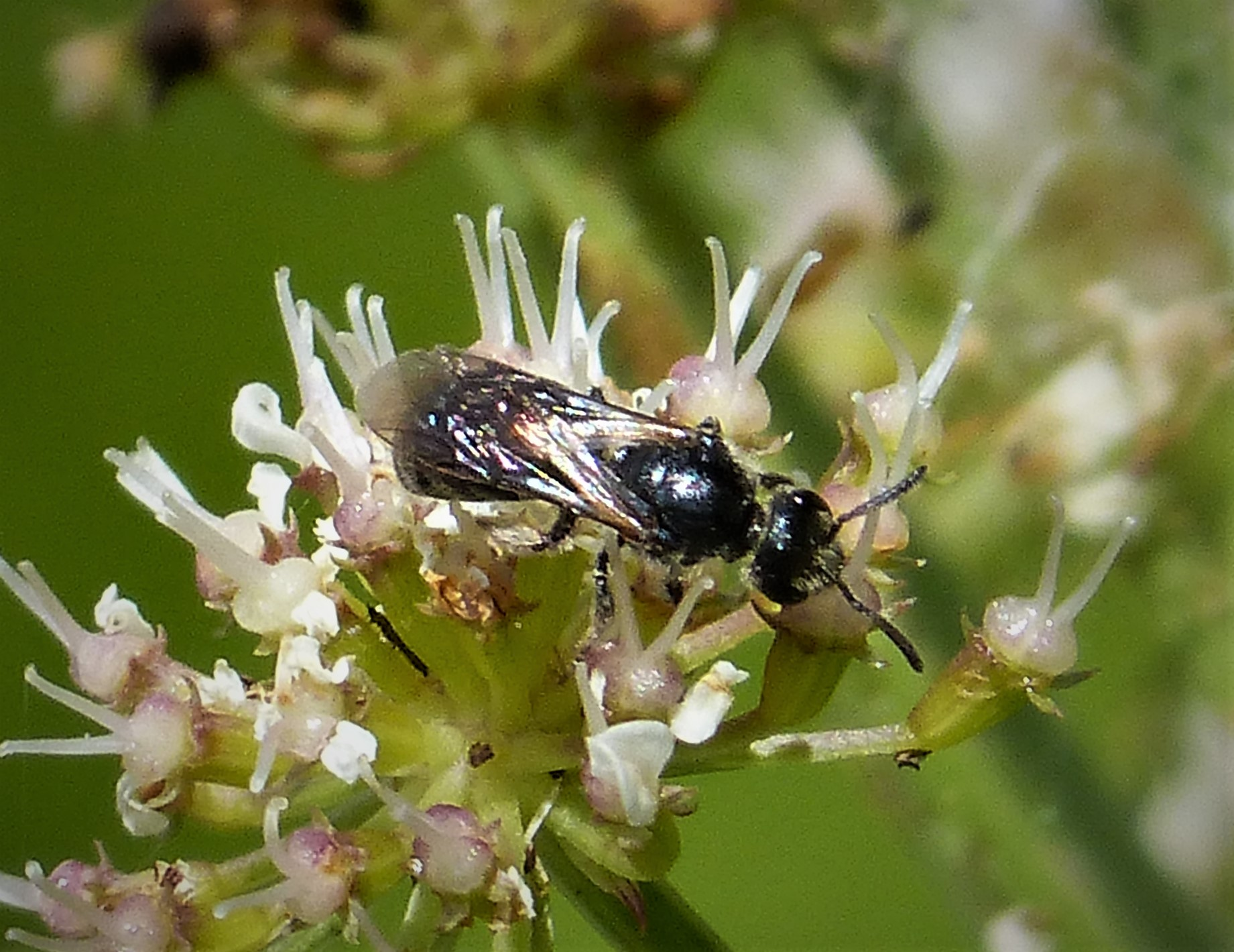
- Lasioglossumcf cupromicans Isle of Arran

Scientific classification
- Domain: Eukaryota
- Kingdom: Animalia
- Phylum: Arthropoda
- Class: Insecta
- Order: Hymenoptera
- Family: Halictidae
- Subfamily: Halictinae
- Tribe: Halictini
- Genus: Lasioglossum
- Species: L. cupromicans

Binomial name
- Lasioglossum cupromicans (Pérez, 1903)

= Lasioglossum cupromicans =

Species of bee

Lasioglossum cupromicans is a Palearctic species of sweat bee.
