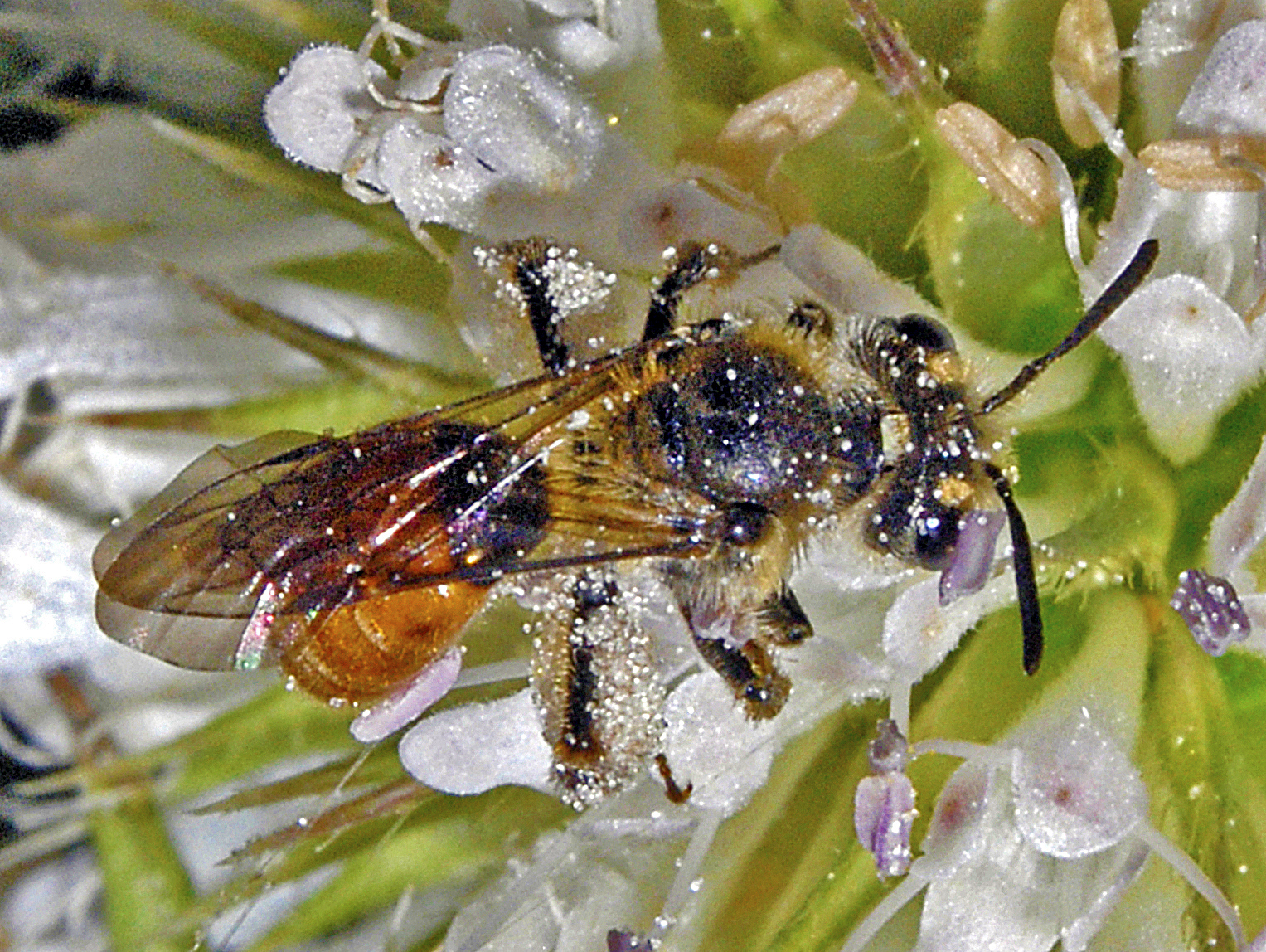
- Female of Andrena marginata

Scientific classification
- Domain: Eukaryota
- Kingdom: Animalia
- Phylum: Arthropoda
- Class: Insecta
- Order: Hymenoptera
- Family: Andrenidae
- Genus: Andrena
- Species: A. marginata

Binomial name
- Andrena marginata Fabricius, 1776

= Andrena marginata =

Species of bee

Andrena marginata, sometimes called the small scabious mining bee is a species of the sand bee (Andrena) genus.

== Distribution and habitat ==
This species is present in most of Europe and in the East Palaearctic. It can mainly be found in acidic or calcareous grasslands, moors, heaths, moorland edges and woodland, where Devil's-bit scabious plants occur.

== Description ==
Andrena marginata. Video Clip

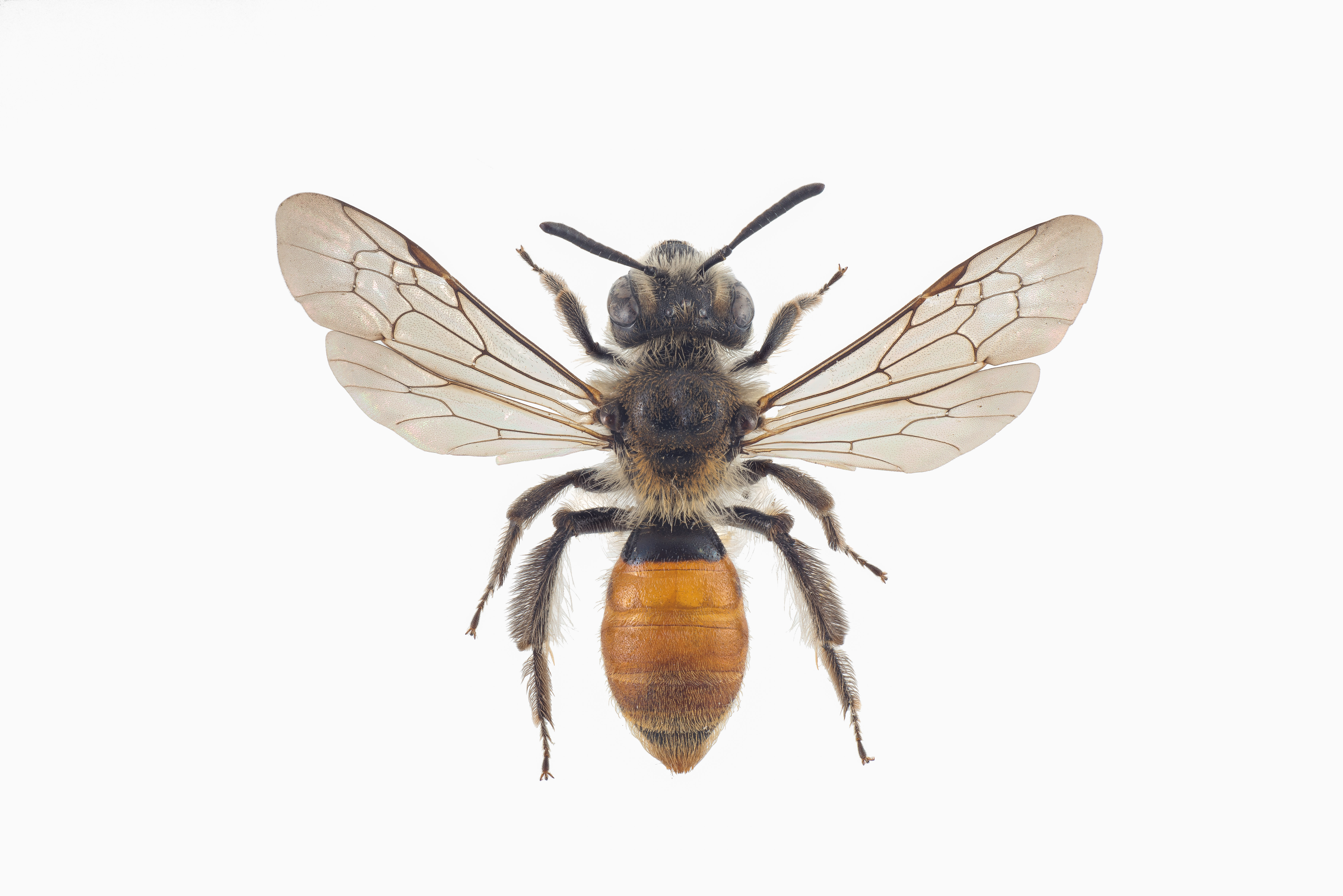
Andrena marginata. Mounted specimen

Andrena marginata can reach a body length of about 11 mm (0.43 in). The basic body color of these medium-sized mining bees is black or dark brown. In the males the dark color is widespread on the hind body, only the second and third tergites are partially orange colored. They are slimmer, with denser body hairs than the female. The male shows a yellowish-white mouth shield.

The females of A. marginata occur in different colour forms. Usually the females have strongly hairs and a special pollen basket on hind legs. Moreover, in the females the hind body lacks hairs and they are black only on the first tergite (hind body segment), while other tergites are orange colored. Some females are predominantly orange. However more or less completely black or dark individuals can be found in both sexes.

== Biology ==
Andrena marginata is an univoltine species. Adults of these solitary bees fly between mid July to late September. They are oligolectic on late flowering scabious flowers. They feed on different nectar-bearing plants of the family Dipsacaceae, like field scabious, Small scabious (Scabiosa columbaria) and Devil's-bit scabious (from which its common name derives), though they have also been observed foraging on knapweed, bramble (Rubus fruticosus), meadowsweet (Filipendula ulmaria), willowherb (Epilobium species), nipplewort (Lapsana communis) and creeping thistle. The female builds a nest in the ground and fills the cells with a mixture of nectar and pollen. One egg is placed in each cell and the larva hatches, grow and pupates within the nest. The adults emerge in spring after hibernation.
