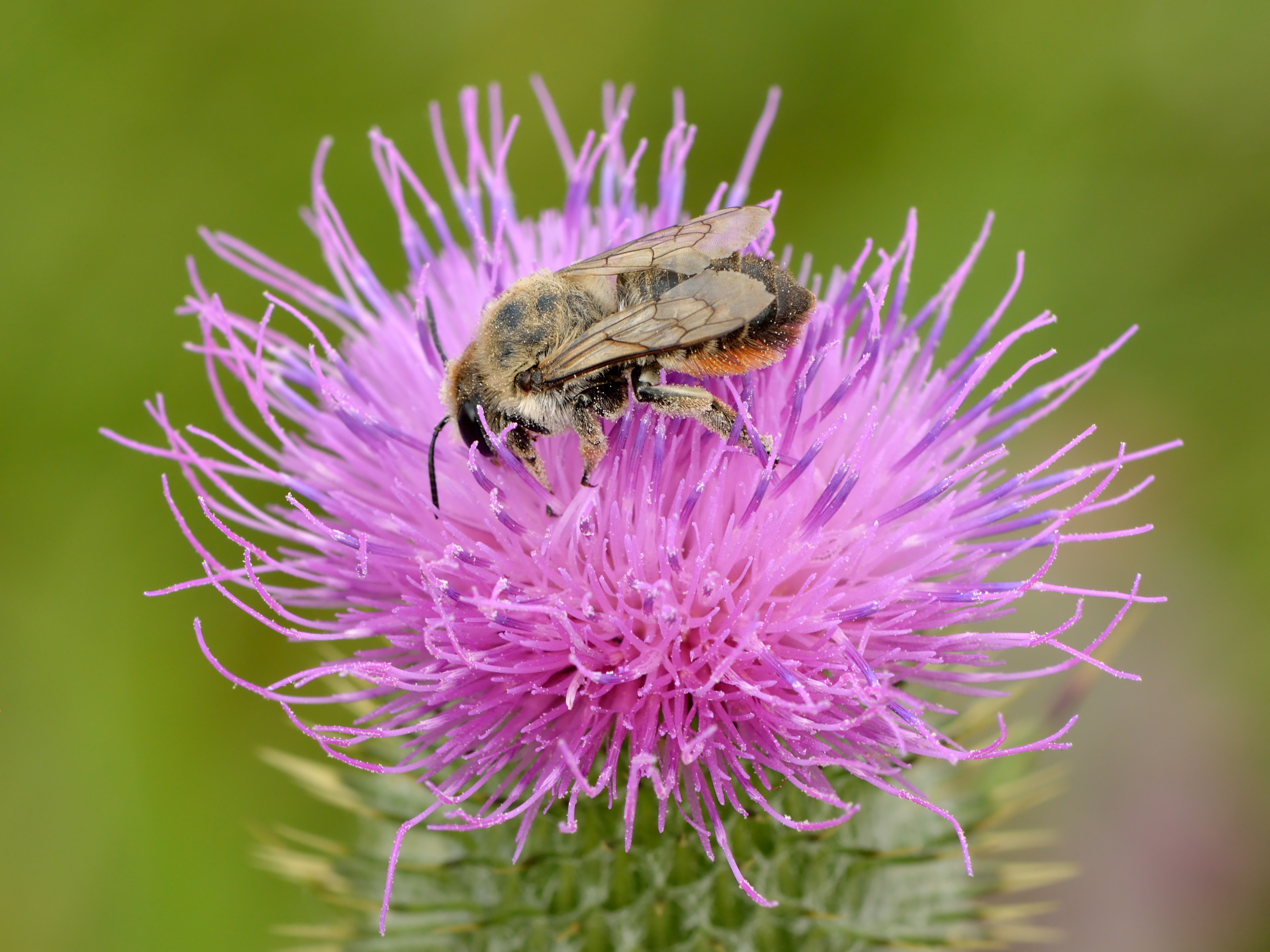

Scientific classification
- Domain: Eukaryota
- Kingdom: Animalia
- Phylum: Arthropoda
- Class: Insecta
- Order: Hymenoptera
- Family: Megachilidae
- Genus: Megachile
- Species: M. versicolor

Binomial name
- Megachile versicolor Smith, 1844

= Megachile versicolor =

Species of bee

Megachile versicolor is a species of bee in the family Megachilidae. It was described by Smith in 1844.
