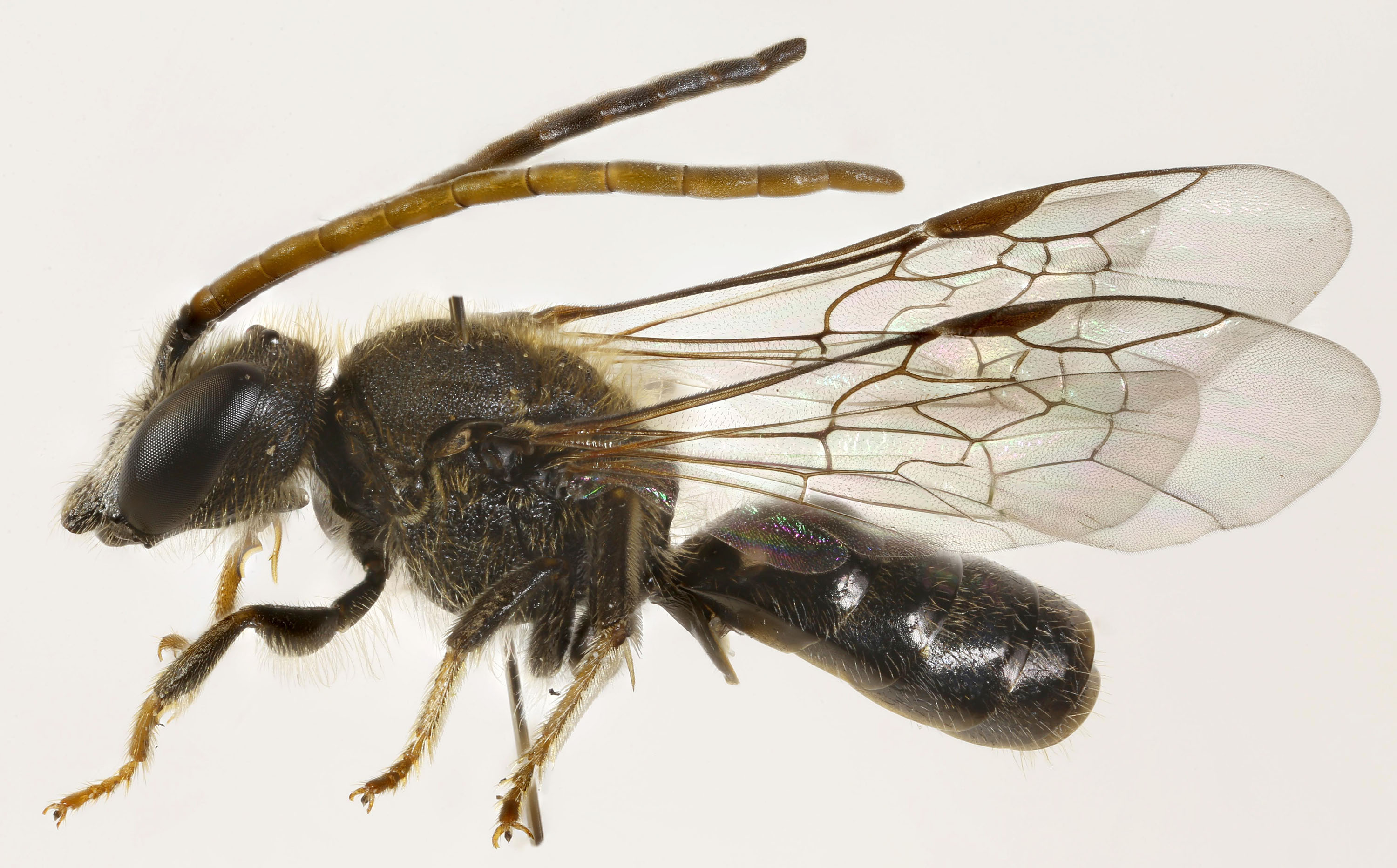
- Lasioglossum fratellum, Maentwrog, North Wales

Scientific classification
- Domain: Eukaryota
- Kingdom: Animalia
- Phylum: Arthropoda
- Class: Insecta
- Order: Hymenoptera
- Family: Halictidae
- Subfamily: Halictinae
- Tribe: Halictini
- Genus: Lasioglossum
- Species: L. fratellum

Binomial name
- Lasioglossum fratellum (Pérez, 1903)

= Lasioglossum fratellum =

Species of bee

Lasioglossum fratellum is a Palearctic species of sweat bee.
