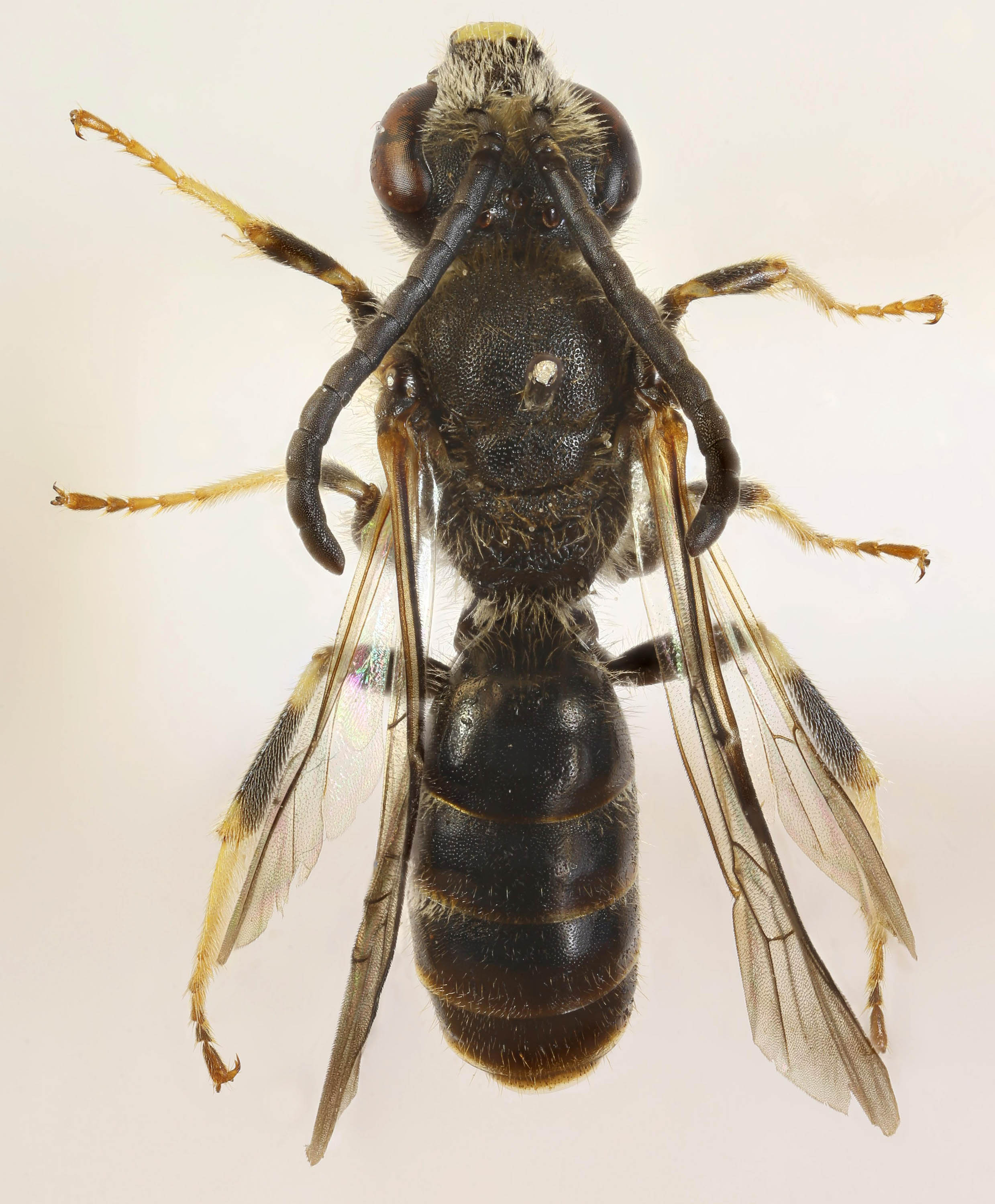
- Lasioglossum albipes male, Minera, North Wales

Scientific classification
- Domain: Eukaryota
- Kingdom: Animalia
- Phylum: Arthropoda
- Class: Insecta
- Order: Hymenoptera
- Family: Halictidae
- Subfamily: Halictinae
- Tribe: Halictini
- Genus: Lasioglossum
- Species: L. albipes

Binomial name
- Lasioglossum albipes (Fabricius, 1781)

= Lasioglossum albipes =

Species of bee

Lasioglossum albipes is a Palearctic species of sweat bee.
