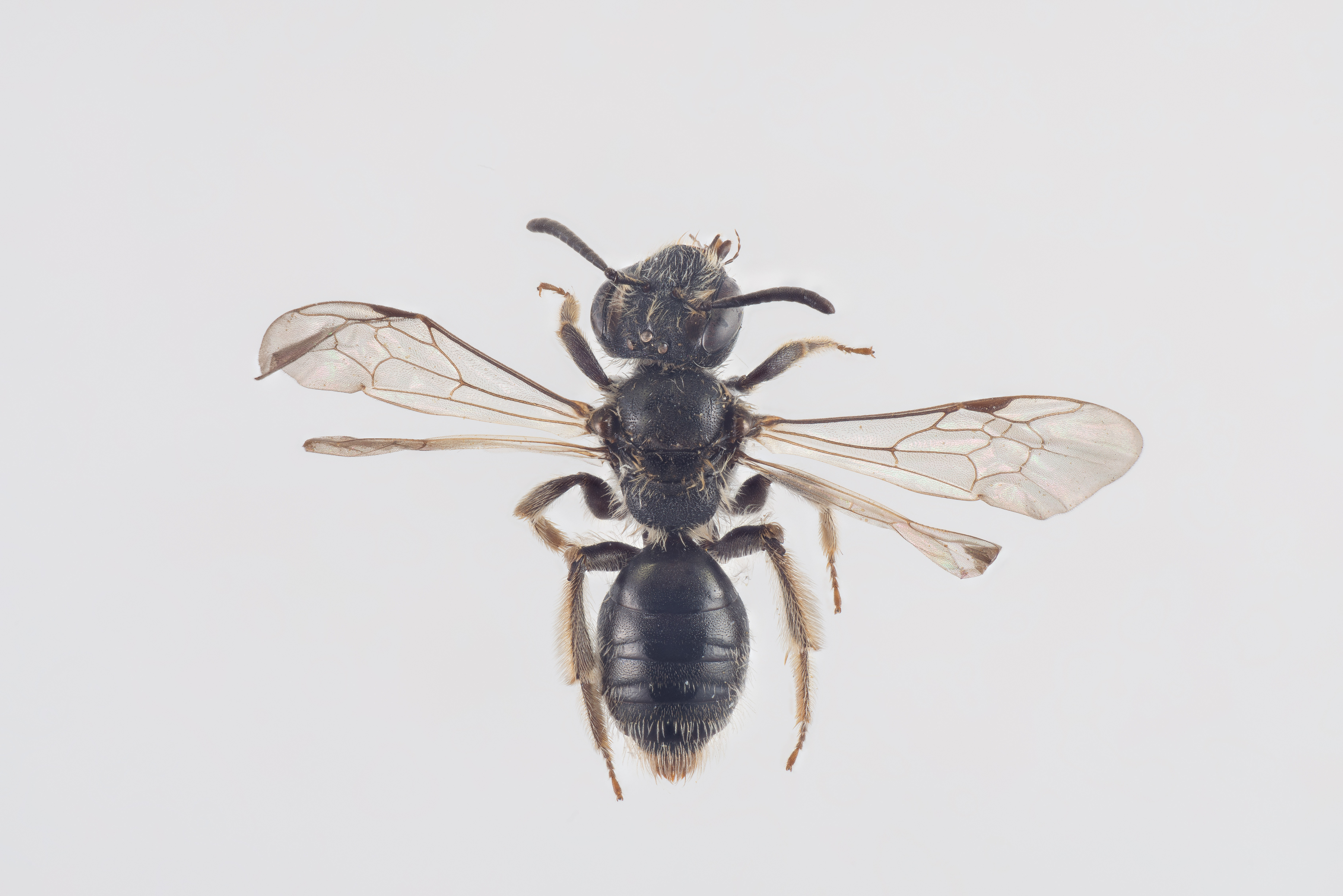
- Andrena semilaevis Norway

Conservation status
- Data Deficient (IUCN 3.1)

Scientific classification
- Kingdom: Animalia
- Phylum: Arthropoda
- Clade: Pancrustacea
- Class: Insecta
- Order: Hymenoptera
- Family: Andrenidae
- Genus: Andrena
- Species: A. semilaevis

Binomial name
- Andrena semilaevis Perez, 1903

= Andrena semilaevis =

Species of bee

Andrena semilaevis is a Palearctic species of mining bee.
