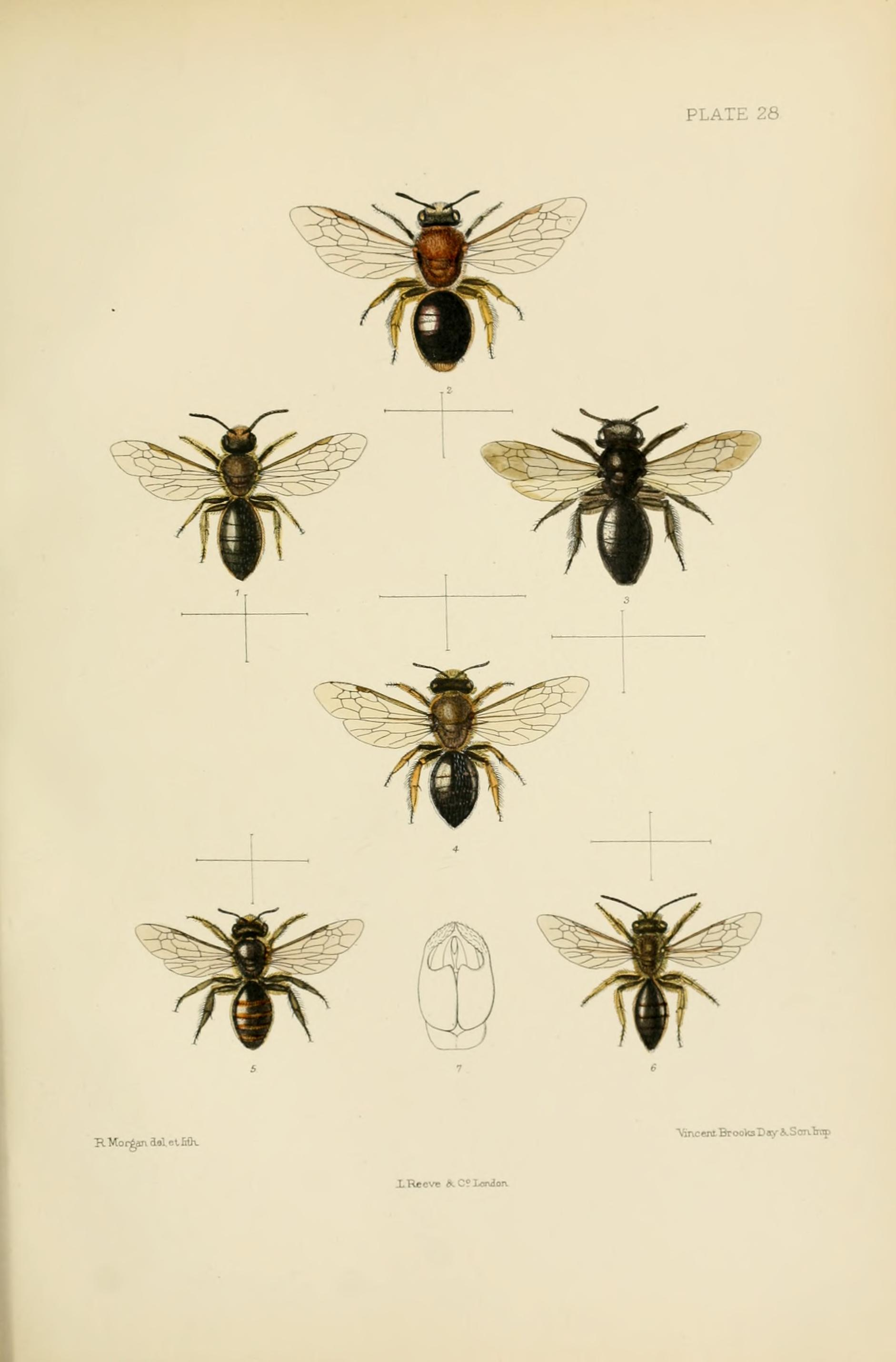
- in Saunders Hymenoptera Aculeata 1896

Scientific classification
- Kingdom: Animalia
- Phylum: Arthropoda
- Class: Insecta
- Order: Hymenoptera
- Family: Andrenidae
- Genus: Andrena
- Species: A. pilipes

Binomial name
- Andrena pilipes Fabricius, 1781

= Andrena pilipes s.s. =

Species of bee

Andrena pilipes is a Palearctic species of mining bee.
