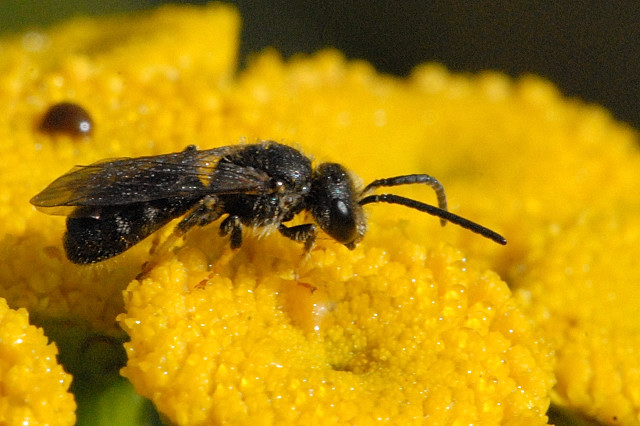
- Lasioglossum lativentre Ardennes

Scientific classification
- Kingdom: Animalia
- Phylum: Arthropoda
- Clade: Pancrustacea
- Class: Insecta
- Order: Hymenoptera
- Family: Halictidae
- Subfamily: Halictinae
- Tribe: Halictini
- Genus: Lasioglossum
- Species: L. lativentre

Binomial name
- Lasioglossum lativentre (Schenck, 1853)

= Lasioglossum lativentre =

Species of bee

Lasioglossum lativentre is a Palearctic species of sweat bee.
