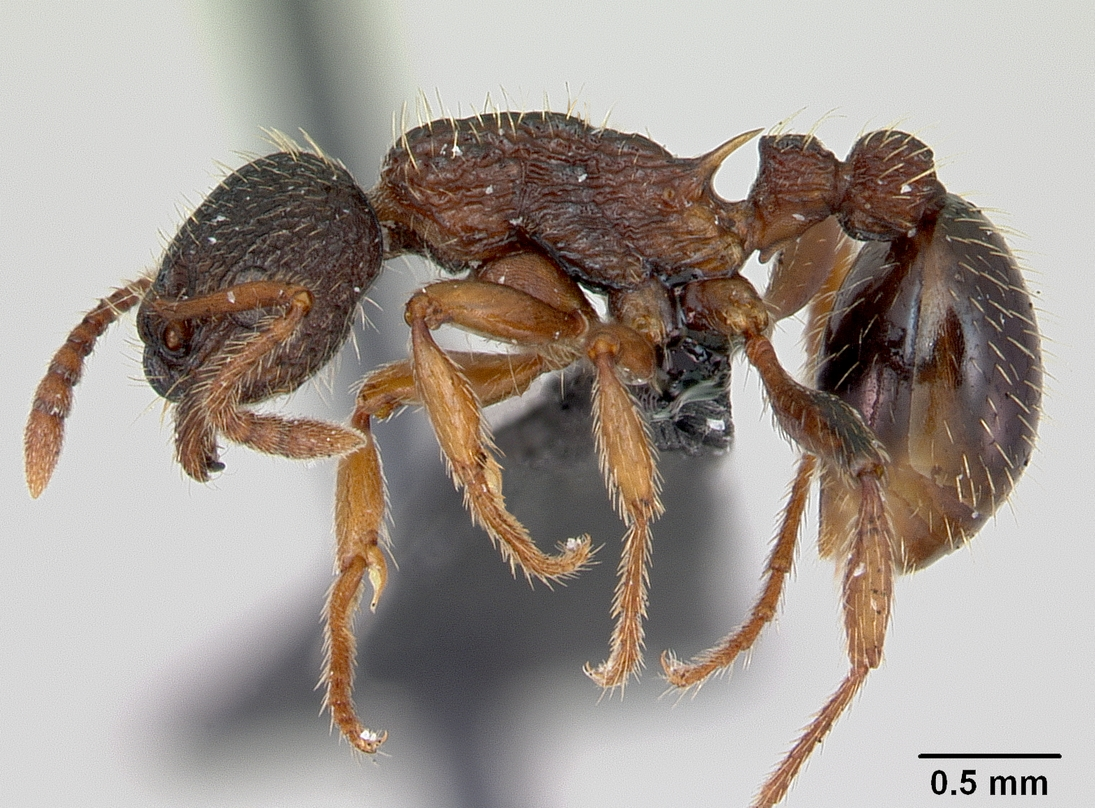
- worker

Scientific classification
- Domain: Eukaryota
- Kingdom: Animalia
- Phylum: Arthropoda
- Class: Insecta
- Order: Hymenoptera
- Family: Formicidae
- Subfamily: Myrmicinae
- Genus: Myrmica
- Species: M. lobicornis

Binomial name
- Myrmica lobicornis (Nylander, 1846)

= Myrmica lobicornis =

Species of ant

Myrmica lobicornis is an ant species distributed through the planes of North Europe and the mountains of Central and Southern Europe. It is also found in the forest zone of East Europe, the Caucasus, West Siberia, North-East Kazakhstan, East Siberia, and Mongolia stretching until Transbaikalia in the East. It inhabits coniferous or mixed woodlands, occasionally also meadows. It mostly nests in the ground, forms monogynous colonies containing a few hundred workers.
