= Andrena stragulata =

Scientific classification
- Domain: Eukaryota
- Kingdom: Animalia
- Phylum: Arthropoda
- Class: Insecta
- Order: Hymenoptera
- Family: Andrenidae
- Genus: Andrena
- Species: A. stragulata

Binomial name
- Andrena stragulata Illiger, 1806

Species of bee

Andrena stragulata is a Palearctic species of mining bee.
