= Andrena lapponica =

- Andrena lapponica

Scientific classification
- Kingdom: Animalia
- Phylum: Arthropoda
- Clade: Pancrustacea
- Class: Insecta
- Order: Hymenoptera
- Family: Andrenidae
- Subfamily: Andreninae
- Genus: Andrena
- Species: A. lapponica

Binomial name
- Andrena lapponica Zetterstedt, 1838

Species of bee

Andrena lapponica is a Palearctic species of mining bee.
