= William Kirby (entomologist) =

English entomologist (1759–1850)

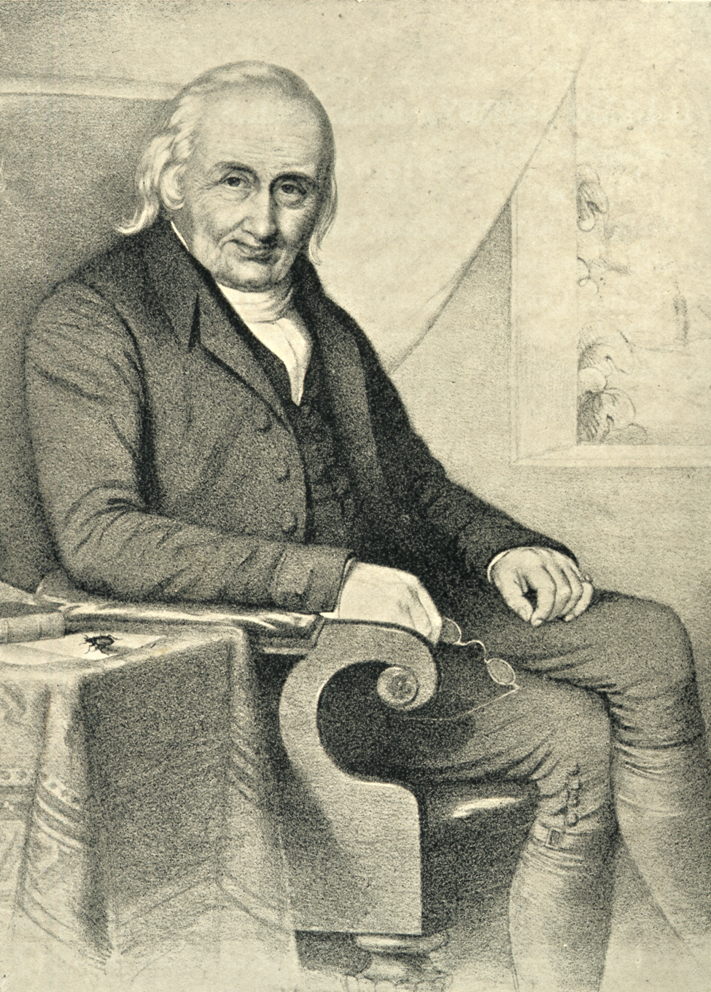
- Lithograph by T.H. Maguire
- Born: 19 September 1759; Witnesham, Suffolk, England
- Died: 4 July 1850 (aged 90); Barham, Suffolk, England
- Education: Cambridge University
- Known for: "Founder of Entomology"
- Scientific career
- Fields: Entomology
- Workplaces: Ipswich Museum: Entomological Society of London: Linnean Society
- Author abbrev. (zoology): Kirby

William Kirby (19 September 1759 – 4 July 1850) was an English entomologist, an original member of the Linnean Society and a Fellow of the Royal Society, as well as a country rector, so that he was an eminent example of the "parson-naturalist". The four-volume Introduction to Entomology, co-written with William Spence, was widely influential.

== Family origins and early studies ==
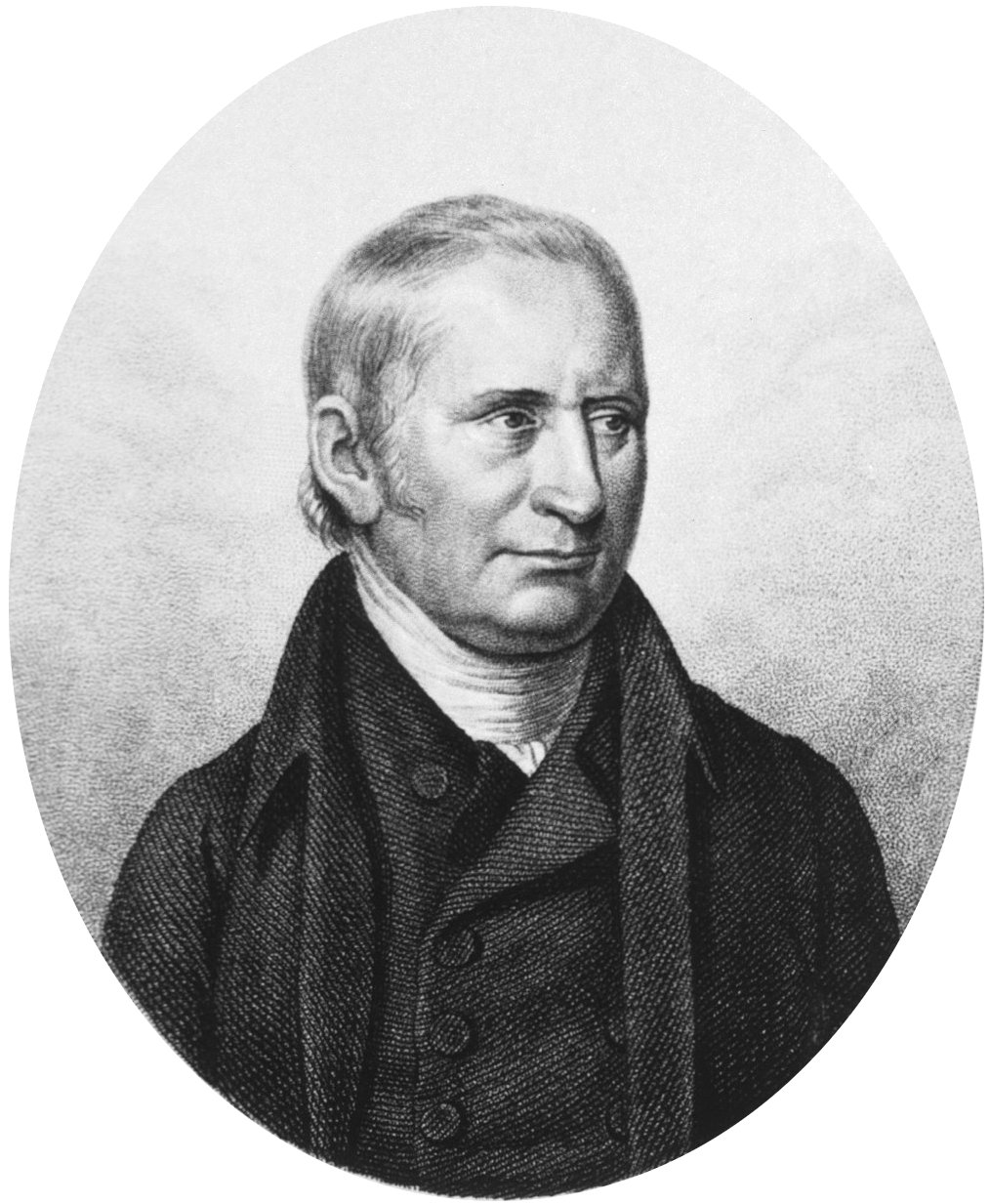
William Kirby

Kirby was a grandson of the Suffolk topographer John Kirby (author of The Suffolk Traveller) and nephew of artist-topographer Joshua Kirby (a friend of Thomas Gainsborough's). He was also a cousin of the children's author Sarah Trimmer. His parents were William Kirby, a solicitor, and Lucy Meadows. He was born on 19 September 1759 at Witnesham, Suffolk, and studied at Ipswich School and Caius College, Cambridge, where he graduated in 1781. Taking holy orders in 1782, he spent his entire working life in the peaceful seclusion of an English country parsonage at Barham in Suffolk, working at the parish church of St Mary's for 68 years, first as curate, then as rector from 1797. He assisted in the publication of pamphlets against Thomas Paine during the 1790s.

Kirby was brought to the study of natural history by Nicholas Gwynn (a friend of Boerhaave's), who introduced him to Sir James Edward Smith in 1791. Soon afterwards, he corresponded with Smith, seeking advice on the foundation of a natural history museum at Ipswich. Among his early friends were the naturalists Charles Sutton and Thomas Marsham, with whom he made lengthy scientific excursions, as later with William Jackson Hooker and others, becoming a leading parson-naturalist. His name appears on the original list of Fellows of the Linnean Society. He delivered the first of his many papers on 7 May 1793, on Three New Species of Hirudo (Linn. Trans. II, 316).

== Major publications ==
Kirby produced his first major work, the Monographia Apum Angliae (Monograph on the Bees of England), in 1802. His purpose was both scientific and religious:

'The author of Scripture is also the author of Nature: and this visible world, by types indeed, and by symbols, declares the same truths as the Bible does by words. To make the naturalist a religious man – to turn his attention to the glory of God, that he may declare his works, and in the study of his creatures may see the loving-kindness of the Lord – may this in some measure be the fruit of my work…' (Correspondence, 1800)

This, the first scientific treatise on English bees, brought him to the notice of leading entomologists in Britain and abroad. Extensive correspondence followed with scientists including Alexander Macleay, Walkenaer, Johan Christian Fabricius and Adam Afzelius. 153 of the bee species, including Lasioglossum malachurum, came from Kirby's own parish.

Kirby began planning his Introduction to Entomology, a celebrated title, in 1808. This was the practical result of a friendship formed in 1805 with William Spence and appeared in four volumes between 1815 and 1826. Much of the work fell to Kirby owing to Spence's ill health. The book was illustrated by John Curtis. It reached its seventh edition in 1856. In 1830 he was invited to write one of the Bridgewater Treatises, his subject being The History, Habits, and Instincts of Animals (2 vols., 1835).

With Edward Sabine and J.E. Gray, Kirby prepared the natural history supplement for Captain William Parry's 1819–1820 polar expedition to seek the North-West Passage: his work formed the insect section of the Account of the Animals seen by the late Northern Expedition while within the Arctic Circle 1821. His friend W.J. Hooker established his contact with John Richardson to involve him in the publication of findings from Sir John Franklin's 1st and 2nd expeditions, the insect section in the Fauna Boreali-Americana in 1837.

== Institution-founding activities ==
In 1815, Kirby took his MA with the intention of applying for the Professorship of Botany at the University of Cambridge when it should become vacant. A dispute arose as to whether this appointment lay in the grant of the Senate or the Crown. Kirby's Tory political complexion proved a stumbling-block, and in the event John Stevens Henslow was appointed.

In 1827, Kirby assisted Henry Denny in arranging the natural history specimens at Norwich Museum. In 1832, he helped to establish an early museum in Ipswich under the aegis of the town's Literary Institute, and presented a herbarium and a group of fossils. With Spence, he helped to found the Entomological Society of London in 1833, with John Westwood as Secretary, and became its Honorary President for life. On that occasion, he presented his own cabinet of insects, collected over more than 40 years, which contained many of the specimens figured in his papers.

Kirby was the original President of the Ipswich Museum, 1847–50, fulfilling a project which he had advocated since 1791, and appeared with William Buckland and others at the opening ceremony. The lithograph by T.H. Maguire was copied from the oil portrait by Friedrich Henry Bischoff commissioned for and still displayed in the Museum. Professor Henslow succeeded him in this office.

== Works ==
Besides the books already mentioned he was the author of many papers in the Transactions of the Linnean Society, the Zoological Journal and other periodicals; Strictures on Sir James Smith's Hypothesis respecting the Lilies of the Field of our Saviour and the Acanthus of Virgil (1819) and Seven Sermons on our Lords Temptations (1829). His Life by the Rev. John Freeman contains an extensive list of his works.

- Kirby, W. & Spence, W., Introduction to Entomology, 4 volumes, (1815–1826).
- Kirby, W., Monographia Apum Angliae; 2 volumes, (1802).
- Kirby, W., On the Power Wisdom and Goodness of God. As Manifested in the Creation of Animals and in Their History, Habits and Instincts; Bridgewater Treatises, W. Pickering, 1835 (reissued by Cambridge University Press, 2009; ISBN 978-1-108-00073-4)
- 'A Century of Insects. Including Several New Genera Described from His Cabinet'; Transactions Linnean Society London, 12:375–453 (1818).
- 'A Description of Several New Species of Insects Collected in New Holland by Robert Brown, Esq.'; Transactions Linnean Society London, 12:454–482 (1818).
- 'A description of some coleopterous insects in the collection of the Rev. F.W. Hope, F.L.S.', Zoological Journal, 3:520–525 (1828).
- 'The Insects' in J. Richardson, Fauna Boreali-Americana; or the Zoology of the Northern Parts of British America: Containing Descriptions of the Objects of Natural History Collected on the Late NorthernLand Expeditions, under Command of Captain Sir John Franklin, R.N; Josiah Fletcher, Norwich, Vol. 4, 377 pp. (Norwich, Josiah Fletcher, 1837).

== See also ==
- Earl of Bridgewater for other Bridgewater Treatises
- Apiology
- Thomas Say Father of Entomology in North America
