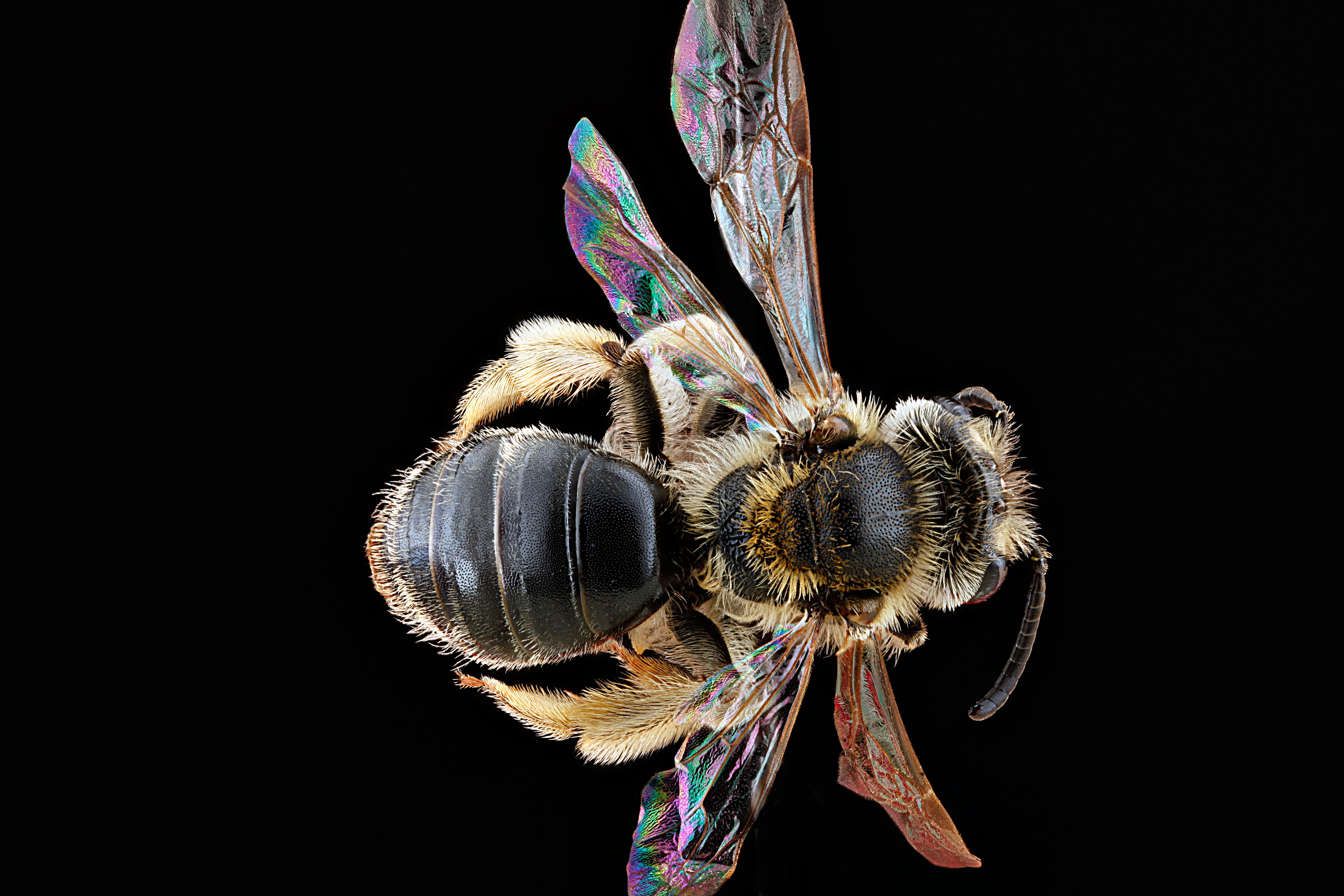

Scientific classification
- Domain: Eukaryota
- Kingdom: Animalia
- Phylum: Arthropoda
- Class: Insecta
- Order: Hymenoptera
- Family: Andrenidae
- Genus: Andrena
- Species: A. imitatrix

Binomial name
- Andrena imitatrix Cresson, 1872

= Andrena imitatrix =

Species of bee

The imitator miner bee (Andrena imitatrix) is a species of miner bee in the family Andrenidae. It is found in North America.
