= Andrena candidiformis =

Scientific classification
- Kingdom: Animalia
- Phylum: Arthropoda
- Class: Insecta
- Order: Hymenoptera
- Family: Andrenidae
- Genus: Andrena
- Species: A. candidiformis

Binomial name
- Andrena candidiformis Viereck & Cockerell, 1914

Species of bee

The white-haired miner bee (Andrena candidiformis) is a species of miner bee in the family Andrenidae. It is found in North America.
