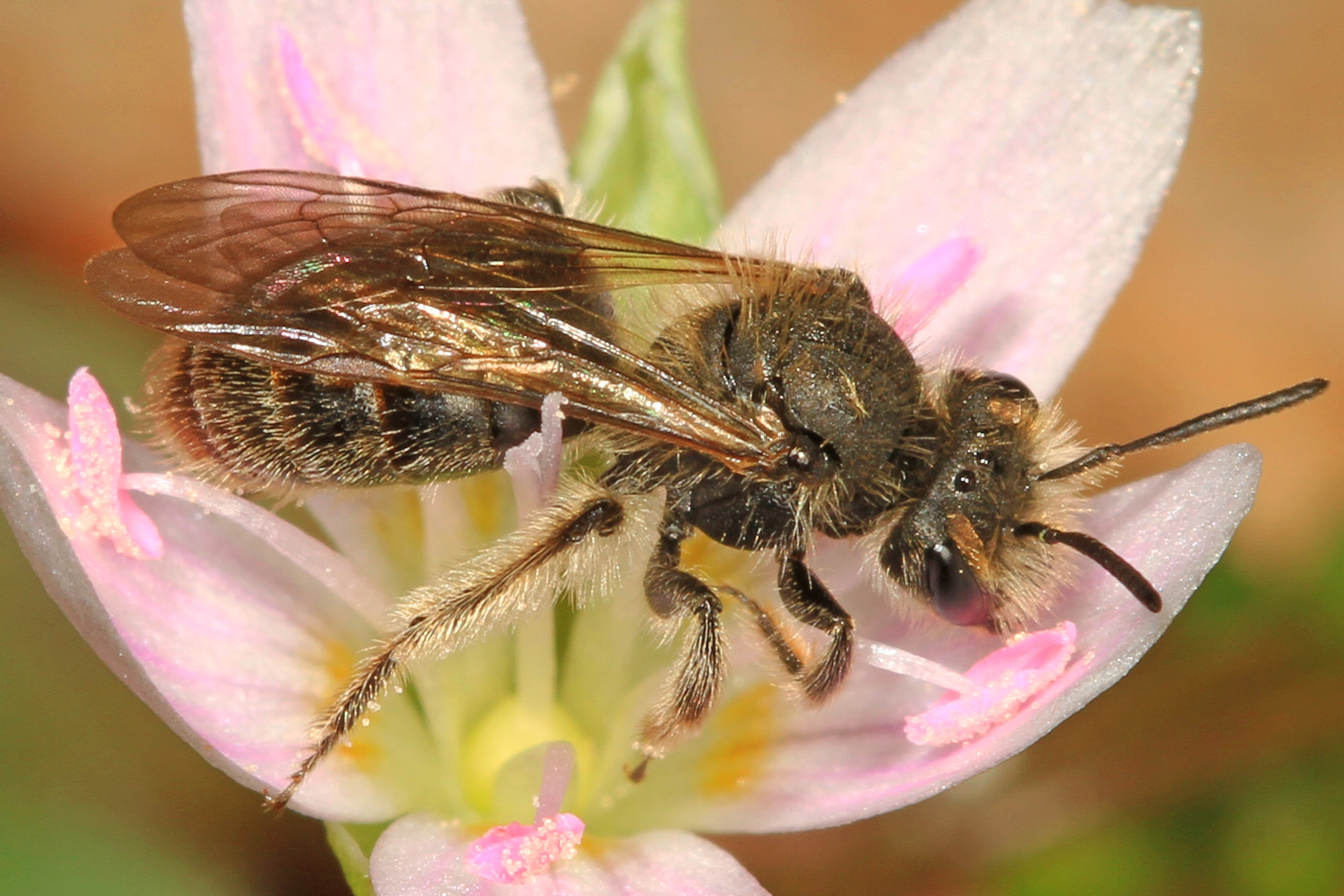

Scientific classification
- Domain: Eukaryota
- Kingdom: Animalia
- Phylum: Arthropoda
- Class: Insecta
- Order: Hymenoptera
- Family: Andrenidae
- Genus: Andrena
- Species: A. erigeniae

Binomial name
- Andrena erigeniae Robertson, 1891

= Andrena erigeniae =

Species of bee

Andrena erigeniae, the spring beauty miner bee or spring beauty andrena is a species of miner bee native to North America.

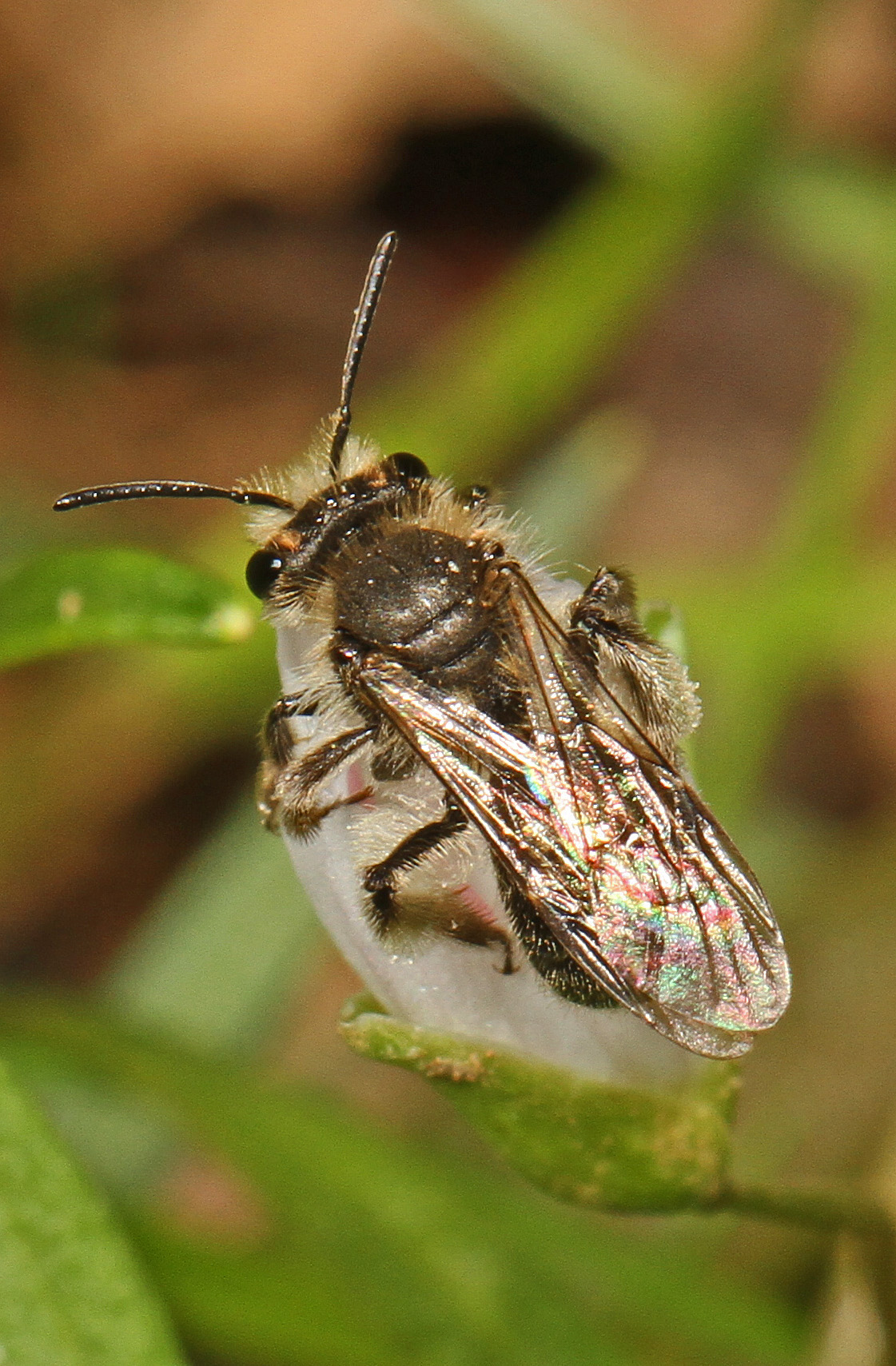
Spring beauty andrena
