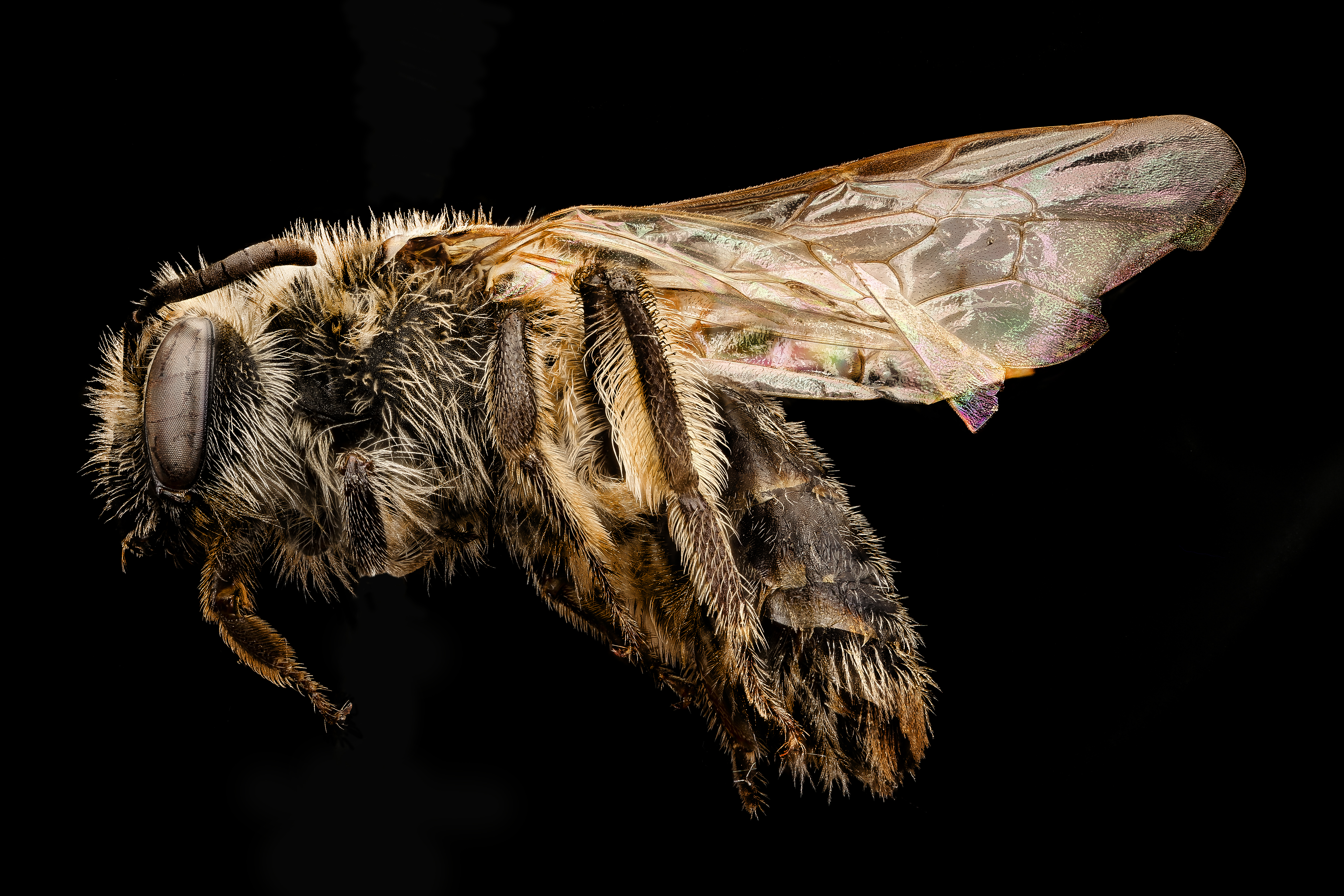

Scientific classification
- Domain: Eukaryota
- Kingdom: Animalia
- Phylum: Arthropoda
- Class: Insecta
- Order: Hymenoptera
- Family: Andrenidae
- Genus: Andrena
- Species: A. miserabilis

Binomial name
- Andrena miserabilis Cresson, 1872

= Andrena miserabilis =

Species of bee

Andrena miserabilis, the smooth-faced miner bee is a species of miner bee in the family Andrenidae. It is found in Central America and North America.
