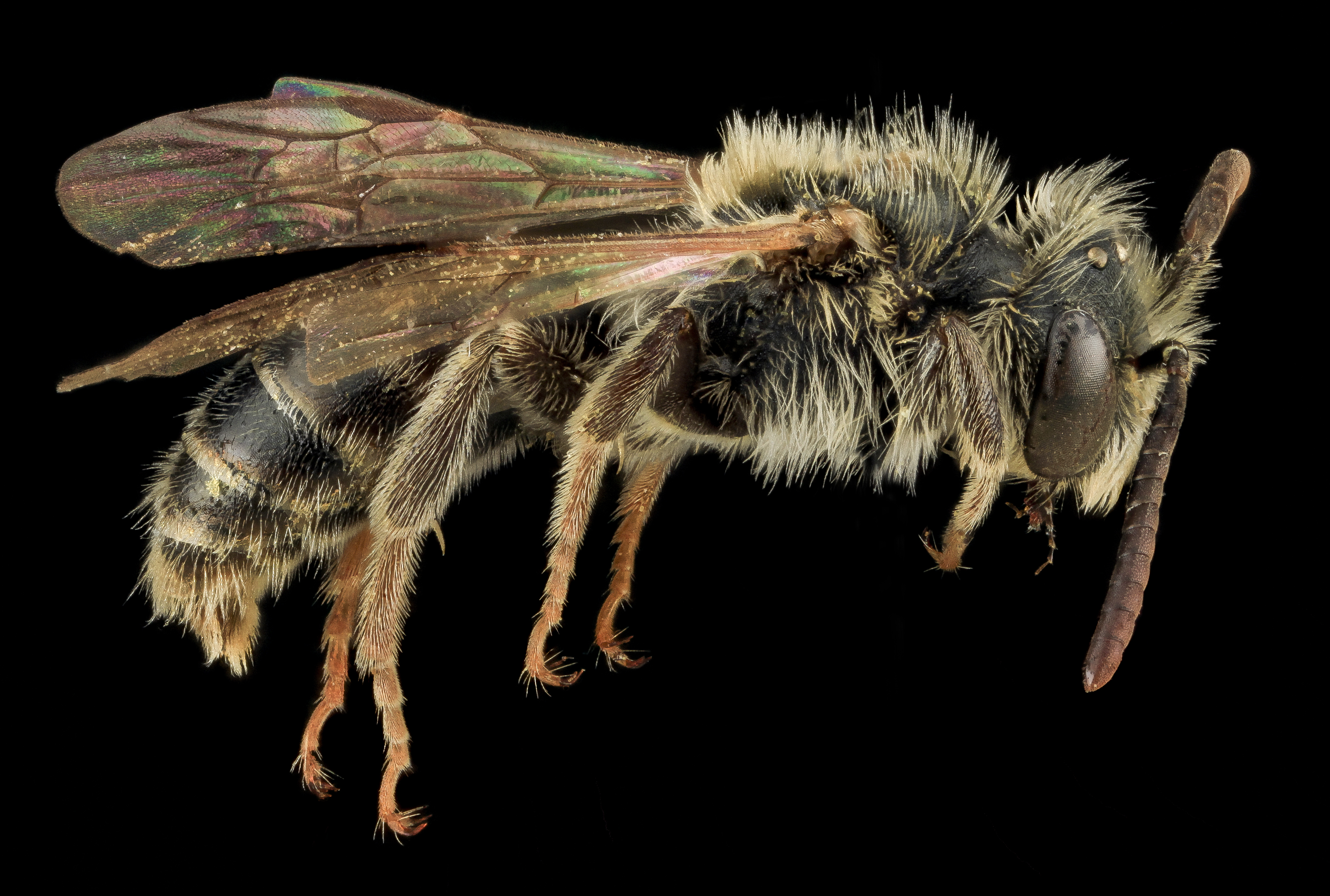

Scientific classification
- Domain: Eukaryota
- Kingdom: Animalia
- Phylum: Arthropoda
- Class: Insecta
- Order: Hymenoptera
- Family: Andrenidae
- Genus: Andrena
- Species: A. nigrae

Binomial name
- Andrena nigrae Robertson, 1905

= Andrena nigrae =

Miner bee species in the family Andrenidae

Andrena nigrae, sometimes called the black miner bee is a species of miner bee in the family Andrenidae. It is found in North America.
