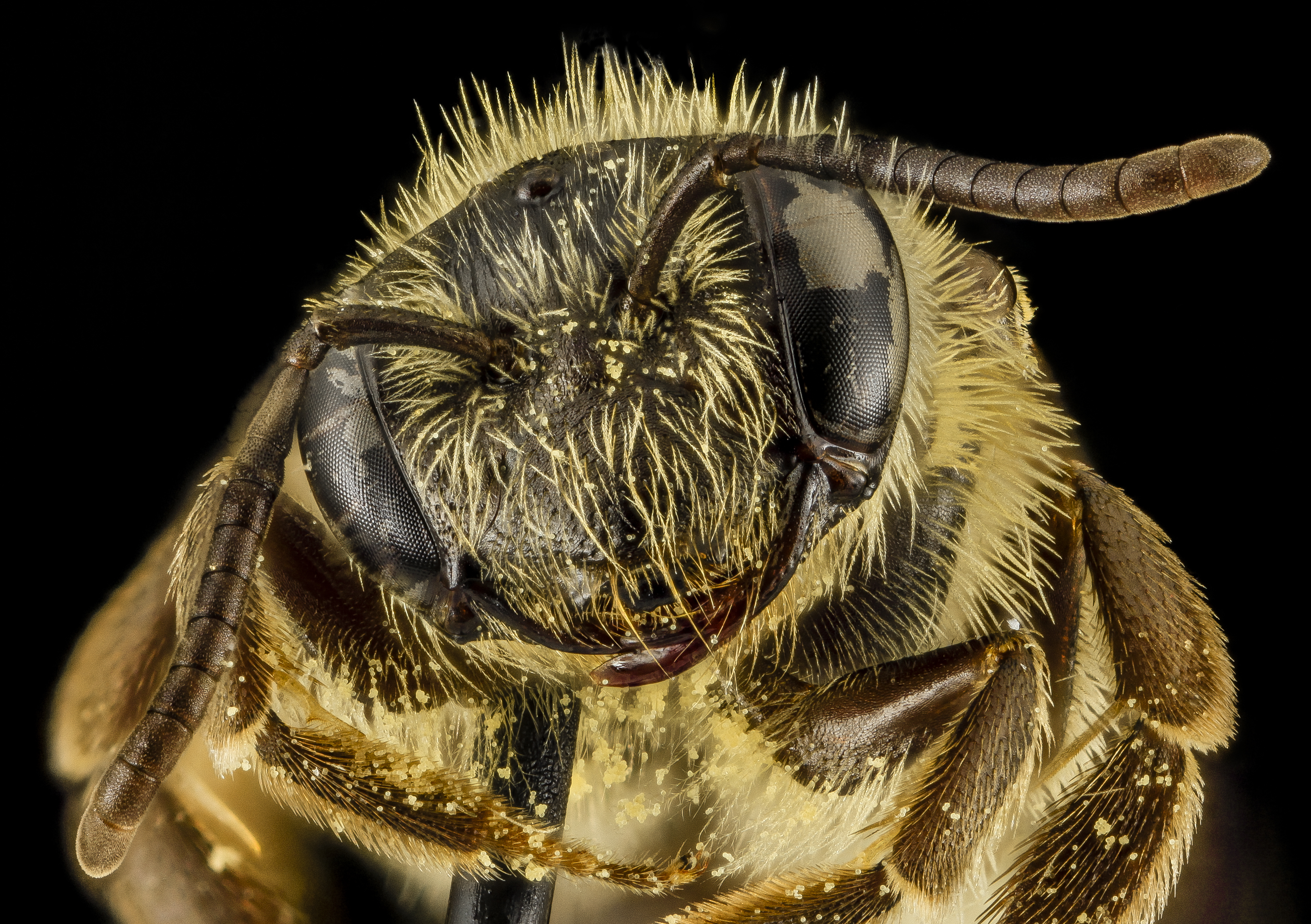

Scientific classification
- Domain: Eukaryota
- Kingdom: Animalia
- Phylum: Arthropoda
- Class: Insecta
- Order: Hymenoptera
- Family: Andrenidae
- Genus: Andrena
- Species: A. nubecula

Binomial name
- Andrena nubecula Smith, 1853

= Andrena nubecula =

Species of insect

The cloudy-winged miner bee (Andrena nubecula) is a species of miner bee in the family Andrenidae. It is found in Central America and North America.

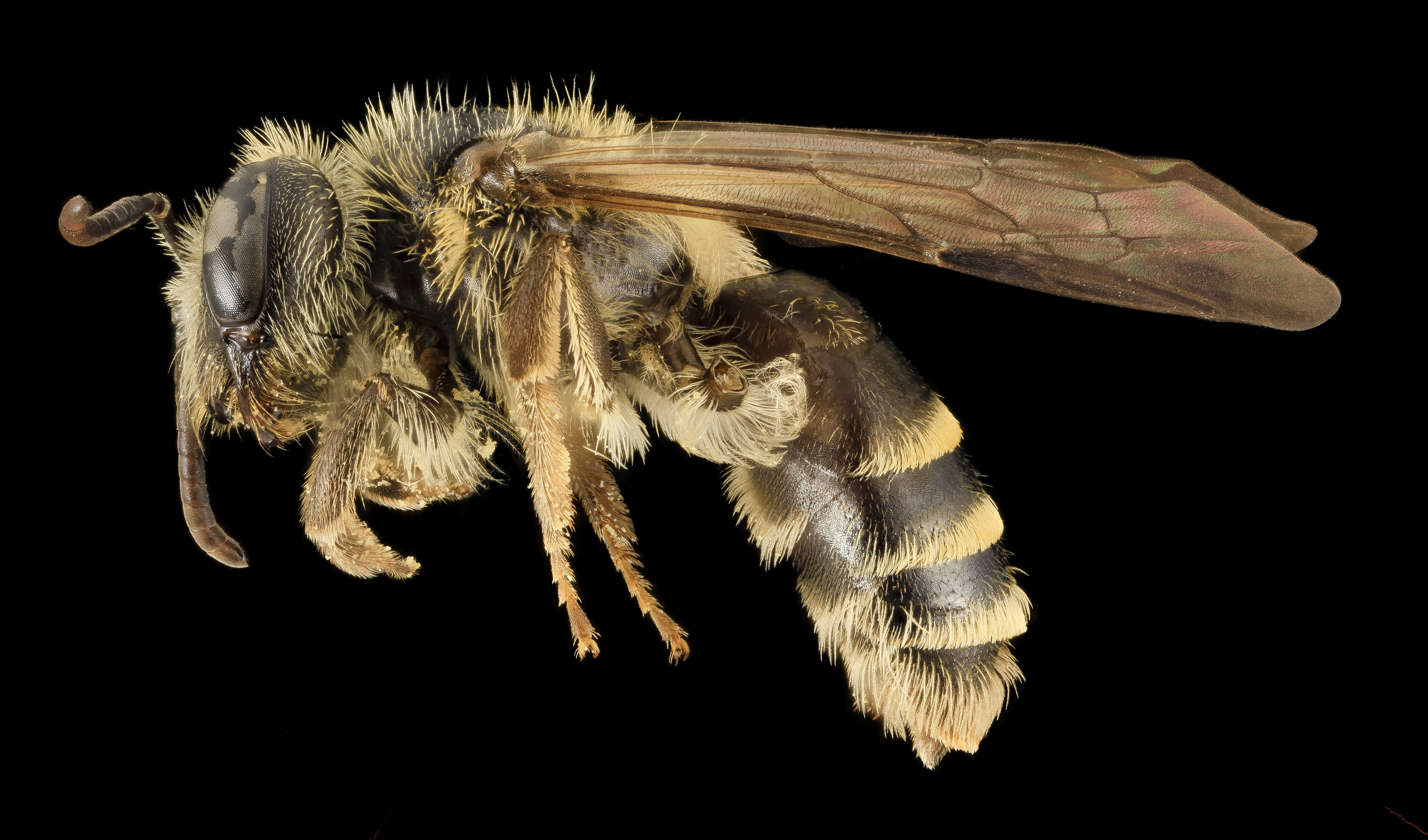
