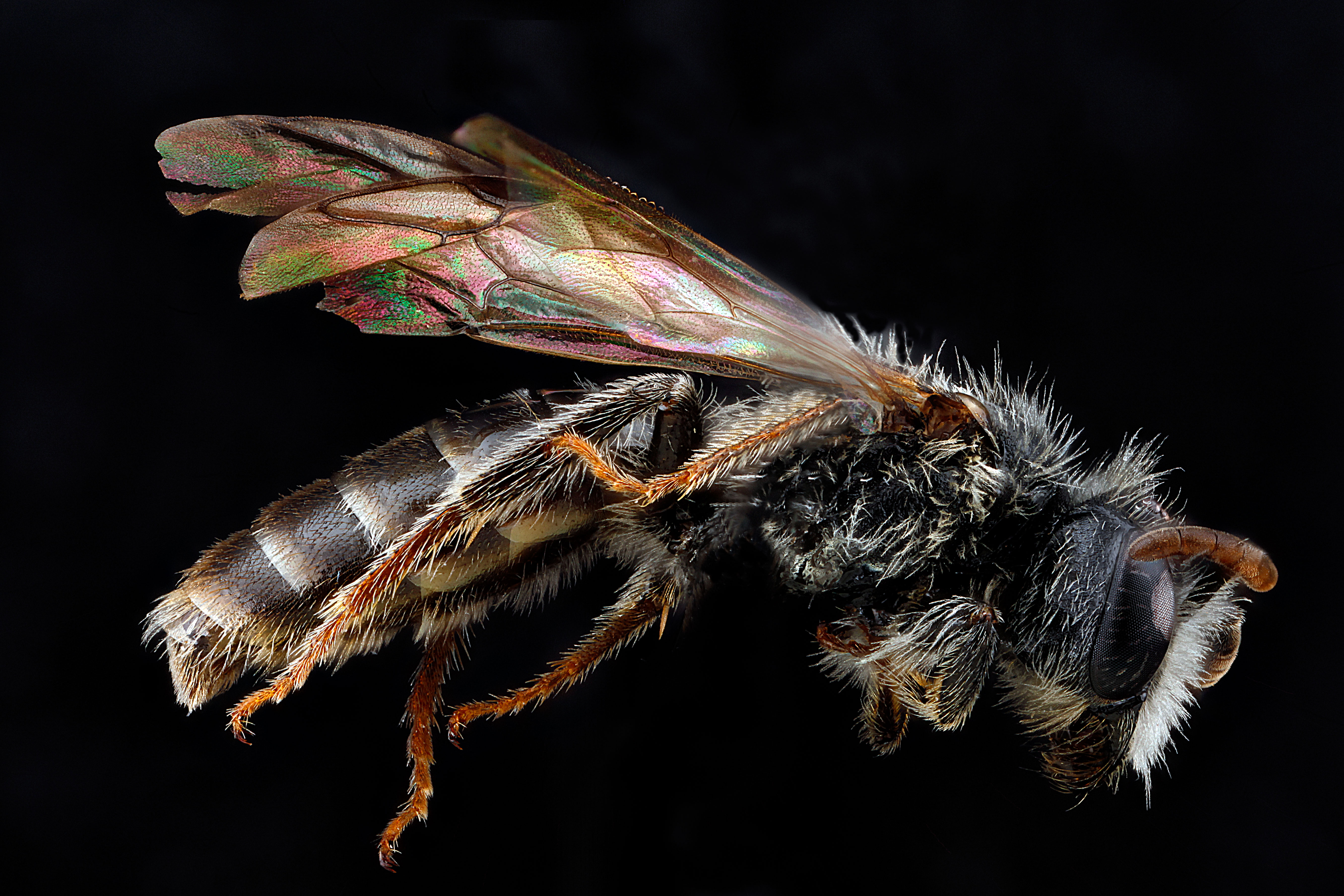

Scientific classification
- Domain: Eukaryota
- Kingdom: Animalia
- Phylum: Arthropoda
- Class: Insecta
- Order: Hymenoptera
- Family: Andrenidae
- Genus: Andrena
- Species: A. fragilis

Binomial name
- Andrena fragilis Smith, 1853

= Andrena fragilis =

Species of bee

The fragile miner bee (Andrena fragilis) is a species of miner bee in the family Andrenidae. It is found in North America.
