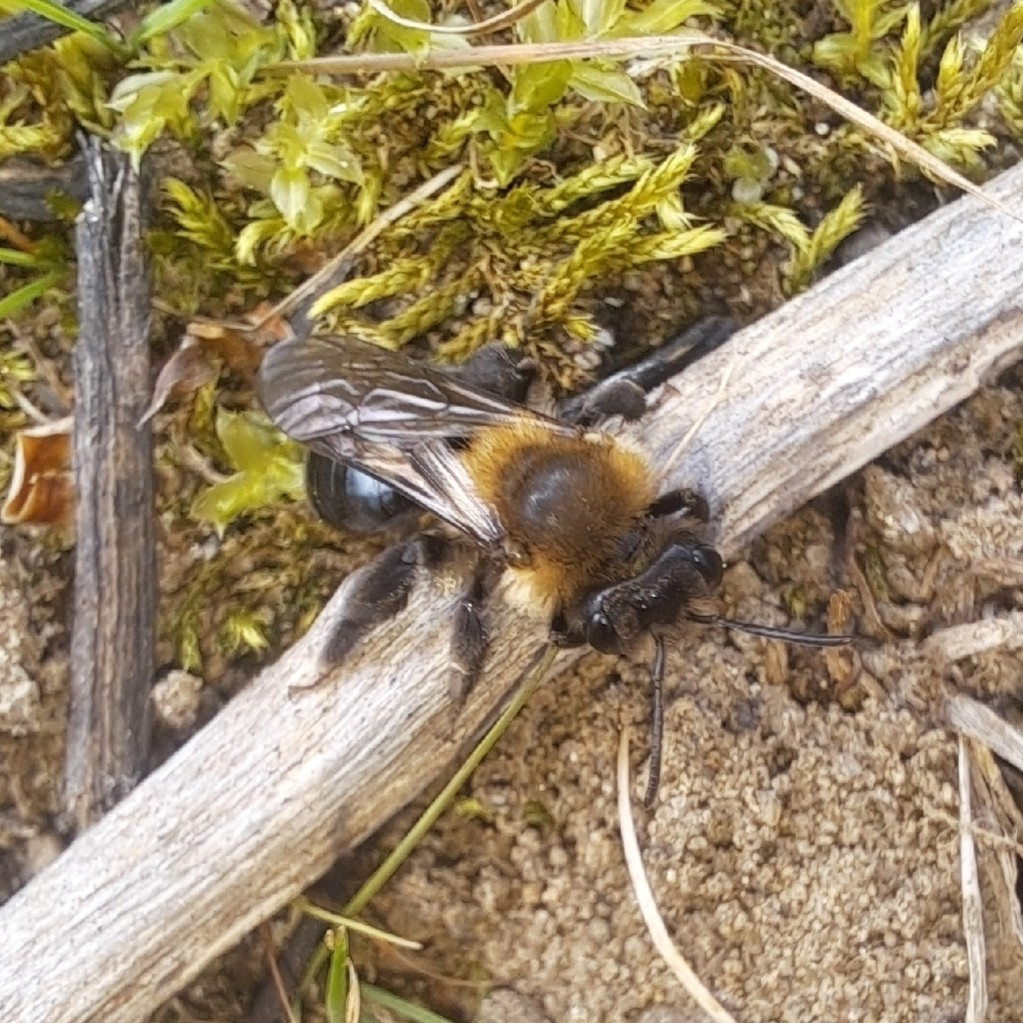
- Oakwood Cemetery, Simcoe, Ontario

Scientific classification
- Kingdom: Animalia
- Phylum: Arthropoda
- Clade: Pancrustacea
- Class: Insecta
- Order: Hymenoptera
- Family: Andrenidae
- Genus: Andrena
- Species: A. regularis

Binomial name
- Andrena regularis Malloch, 1917

= Andrena regularis =

Species of bee

The regular miner bee (Andrena regularis) is a species of miner bee in the family Andrenidae. It is found in North America.

A large colony exists in East Lawn Cemetery of Ithaca, New York.
