= Andrena albifacies =

Scientific classification
- Kingdom: Animalia
- Phylum: Arthropoda
- Clade: Pancrustacea
- Class: Insecta
- Order: Hymenoptera
- Family: Andrenidae
- Genus: Andrena
- Species: A. albifacies

Binomial name
- Andrena albifacies Alfken (1927)

Species of bee

Andrena albifacies is a species of mining bee in the genus Andrena of the family Andrenidae and the order Hymenoptera. This species plays a crucial role in pollination.

== Description ==
The young Andrena albifacies is 8 to 12 mm (0.31 to 0.47 in) in length. Like wasps, it has a heavy body with sticky hairs which are used for pollen collection. It has a distinctive white face. Females have a black body.

== Habitat ==
This bee species is found in flowering areas of North America.
