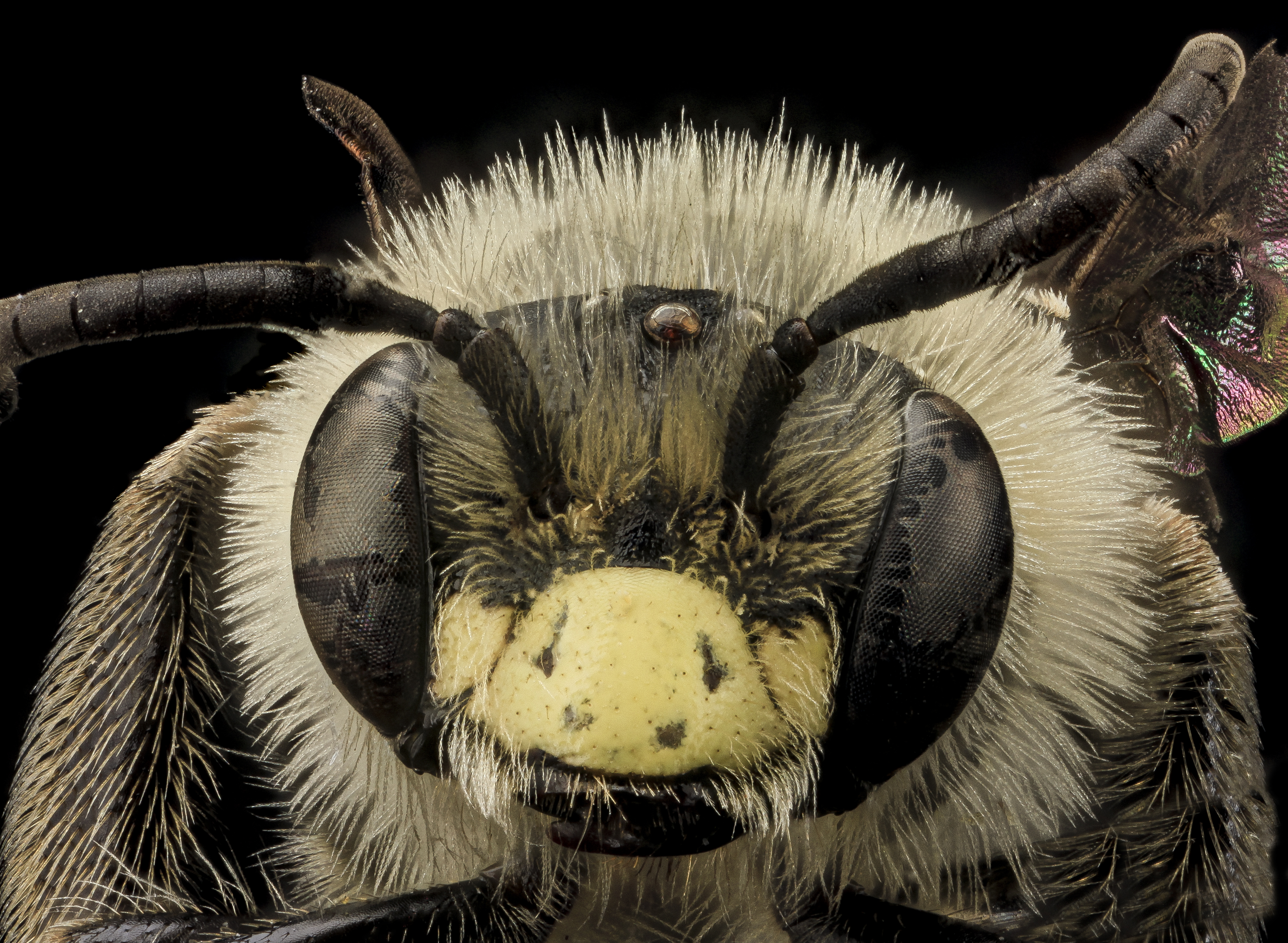
- male

Scientific classification
- Domain: Eukaryota
- Kingdom: Animalia
- Phylum: Arthropoda
- Class: Insecta
- Order: Hymenoptera
- Family: Andrenidae
- Genus: Andrena
- Species: A. lauracea

Binomial name
- Andrena lauracea Robertson, 1879

= Andrena lauracea =

Species of bee

Andrena lauracea is a rare bee species from the United States. It has been collected twice in Carlinville, Illinois, once around 1897 and once in 1970–1972. There are also two putative specimens from Texas.

The Carlinville specimens were collected on Sassafras variifolium (1897) and Prunus serotina (1970).
