= Andrena ghisbaini =

Scientific classification
- Kingdom: Animalia
- Phylum: Arthropoda
- Clade: Pancrustacea
- Class: Insecta
- Order: Hymenoptera
- Family: Andrenidae
- Genus: Andrena
- Species: A. ghisbaini

Binomial name
- Andrena ghisbaini Wood, 2023

Species of bee

Andrena ghisbaini, Ghisbain's mining bee, is a species of solitary bee from the family Andrenidae. It was described in 2023 based on specimens collected in southern Spain.

== Description ==
Andrena ghisbaini is a medium-size, solitary bee from the family Andrenidae, a diversified family of Hymenoptera. The specimens of Andrena ghisbaini known to date were collected in the Málaga province, in southern Spain. Recently collected females of the species were visiting Cistus albidus (Cistaceae) in sympatry with males and females of Dasypoda radchenkoi. The species is active at least from February to May.

== Taxonomy ==
Andrena ghisbaini belongs to the mining bee subgenus Truncandrena. According to the diagnosis presented as part of the original description, the species shows morphological similarity with Andrena villipes but the body size of the latter is distinctly smaller. Phylogenetic analyses also confirmed the separation of both species.

== Etymology ==
The species is dedicated to the Belgian bee taxonomist Guillaume Ghisbain.
