= Andrena salicifloris =

Scientific classification
- Kingdom: Animalia
- Phylum: Arthropoda
- Class: Insecta
- Order: Hymenoptera
- Family: Andrenidae
- Genus: Andrena
- Species: A. salicifloris

Binomial name
- Andrena salicifloris Cockerell, 1897

Species of bee

Andrena salicifloris, or the willow flower miner bee, is a miner bee in the genus Andrena. Another common name for this species is the willow mining bee. The bee ranges from Colorado to California and north to British Columbia, and often inhabits arid and alpine lands. The bee is often black or dark brown, and is sparsely coated with grayish hair on the thorax, legs and on the abdomen. The pollen basket is on most of the hind leg. The wings of the willow flower miner bee are smoky, and their veins are black.

As in the case of most bees, adult willow flower miner bees drink nectar, whereas the larvae feed both on nectar and pollen. The nests of the willow flower miner bees are created when a mated female bee excavates a small tunnel that branch off into small branches. These branches each contain a brood cell, and once each cell has pollen and nectar for the larva to feed on - a small doorway to the brood cell is closed. The larva grows rapidly, but the bees do not emerge until spring.
