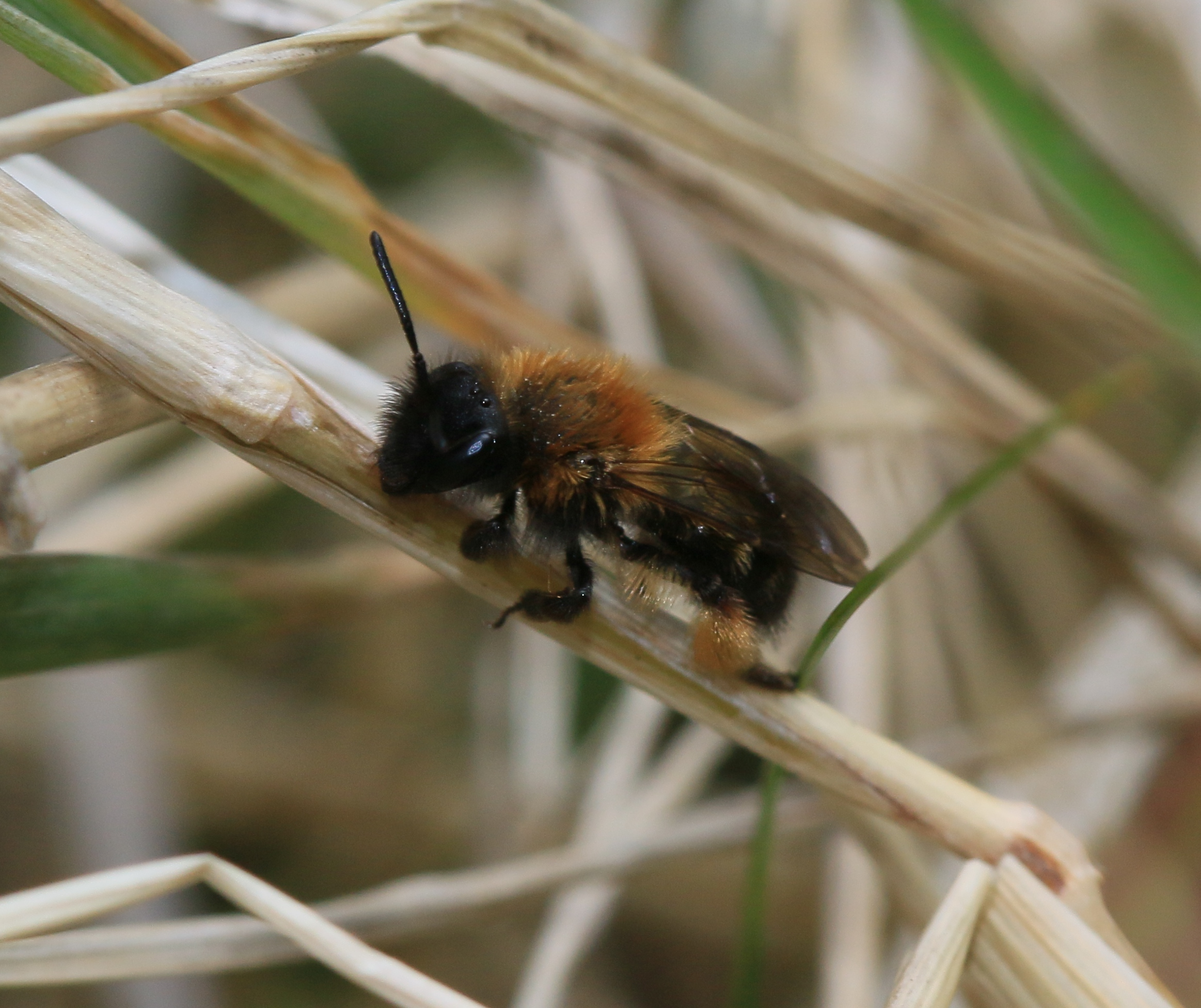
- Female
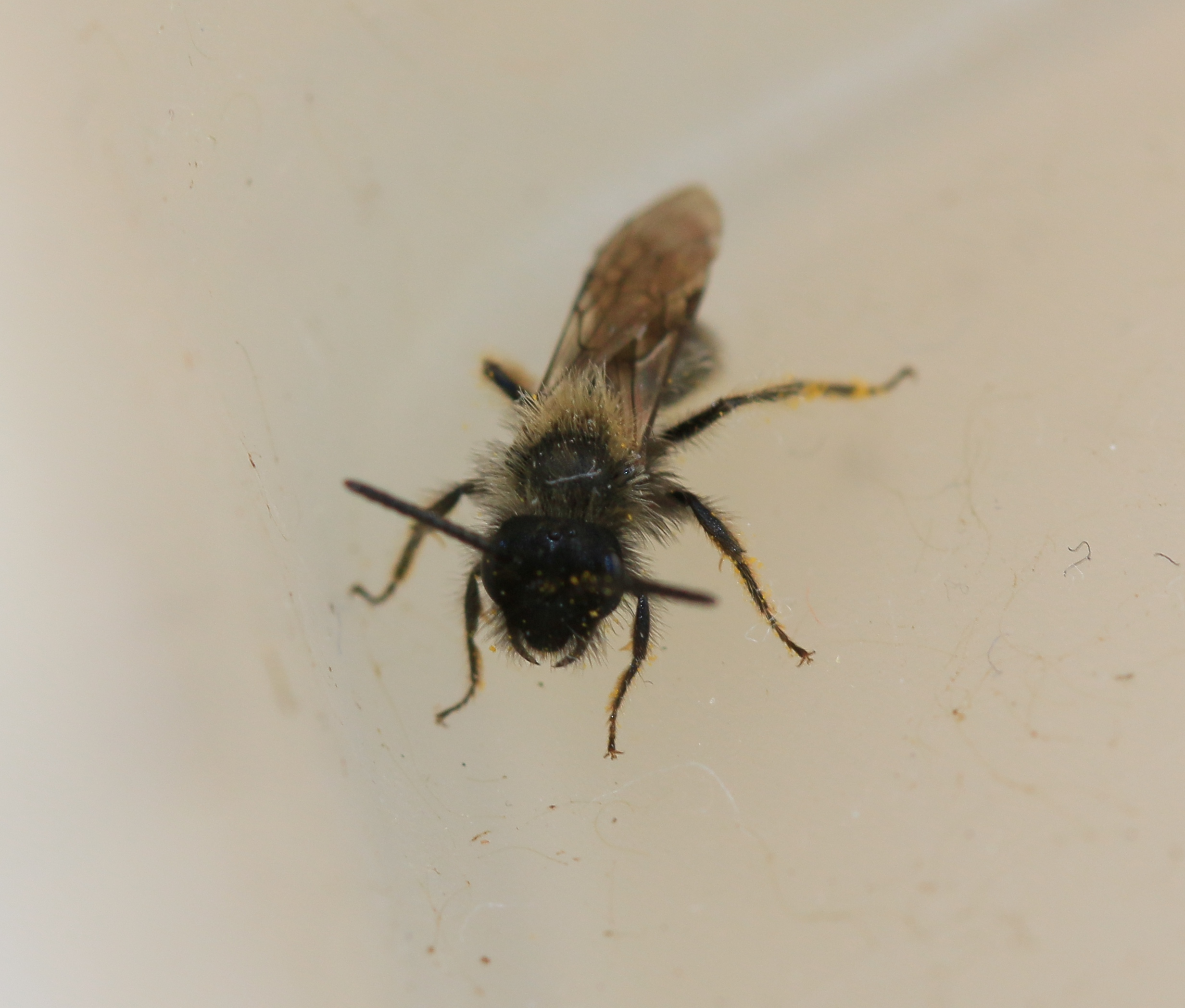
- Male

Conservation status
- Least Concern (IUCN 3.1)

Scientific classification
- Domain: Eukaryota
- Kingdom: Animalia
- Phylum: Arthropoda
- Class: Insecta
- Order: Hymenoptera
- Family: Andrenidae
- Genus: Andrena
- Species: A. bicolor

Binomial name
- Andrena bicolor Fabricius, 1775

Synonyms
- Andrena picicornis (Kirby, 1802); Andrena pilosula (Kirby, 1802); Andrena gwynana (Kirby, 1802); Andrena proxima Smith, 1847; Andrena aestiva Smith, 1849; Andrena consimilis Smith, 1849

= Andrena bicolor =

Species of bee

Andrena bicolor, or Gwynne's mining bee, is a common and widespread Western Palearctic mining bee which is found over most of Europe as well as North Africa and the Middle East and which reaches eastwards into Siberia.

== Description ==
Andrena bicolor is a small to medium-sized mining bee, with the males being slightly smaller than the females. The females have a coat of reddish-brown hairs on the dorsal surface of the thorax, a wholly black-haired face and indistinct bands of yellowish hairs on the margins of the first to third tergites. The spring brood can show an extensive black hair covering on the femur and the sides of the thorax, this is not as marked in the autumn brood. It has dark tibia on the hind legs but these have obvious orange hairs which have been said to resemble a pair of orange leg warmers. The spring brood males have black hairs on the head and side of the thorax and lack the bright colours of the females, while summer brood males often show brown hairs on the face and have no black hairs on the side of the thorax.

== Distribution ==
Andrena bicolor is a widely distributed species in Europe from most of Great Britain and Ireland in the west to southern Fennoscandia south to the Mediterranean, including Corsica, the Balearic Islands, Sicily, Crete and Cyprus but it is not found on Sardinia, its range extends east into Russia and Central Asia. It has also been recorded in Turkey, Israel and Iran. In the Netherlands this species is commoner in the south than in the north but it seems to be expanding its range in the north.

== Habitat and ecology ==
Andrena bicolor shows a rather generalist choice of habitat from calcareous grassland to open woodlands, only avoiding closed canopy woodland and high alpine habitats. In some parts of its distribution it can be a coastal species such as in Ireland and parts of Scotland. In the Alps it extends to 1,800 metres (5,900 ft) in Switzerland but has been recorded up to 2,100 metres (6,900 ft) in Austria. It has two broods during a season, i.e. it is bivoltine, a spring brood which flies from March to June and a summer brood which flies from June to late August. The first brood is much more numerous than the second brood, and the second brood appears to be much more elusive than the first, especially the males.

A. bicolor is polylectic, meaning that it feeds from a wide variety of flowers. This has been shown by sampling the pollen collected by females. The spring brood has been confirmed as foraging on a wide variety of early flowering plants from low herbaceaous species such as coltsfoot (Tussilago farfara), Bellis perennis, dandelion (Taraxacum spp), buttercups (Ranunculus spp), daffodils (Narcissus spp.) and bluebells (Hyacinthoides spp) to spring blossoming shrubs such as hawthorn (Crataegus spp) and willow (Salix spp.). However, the summer brood females feed mainly from bell flowers, in particular the harebell (Campanula rotundifolia) and the clustered bellflower (Campanula glomerata) as well as such species as white bryony (Bryonia alba), blackberry (Rubus spp.), mallows, cranesbills and cinquefoils. In Ukraine A. bicolor is regarded as one of the most important pollinators of the cherry crop.

The nest tunnel may be over 1 metre (3.3 ft) in length and nests can be solitary or in small loose aggregations which are normally on relatively bare ground on south facing banks or slopes. In Germany nests have been found in association with the nests of other Andrena species such as Andrena fulva and species of the Andrena minutula complex. Nests are rarely recorded and are difficult to locate. The cleptoparasitic nomad bee Nomada fabriciana is associated with A. bicolor and the fly Stylops gwynanae may "stylopise" A. bicolor in Spain and eastern Europe and larval Stylops have been observed on adult A. bicolor.
