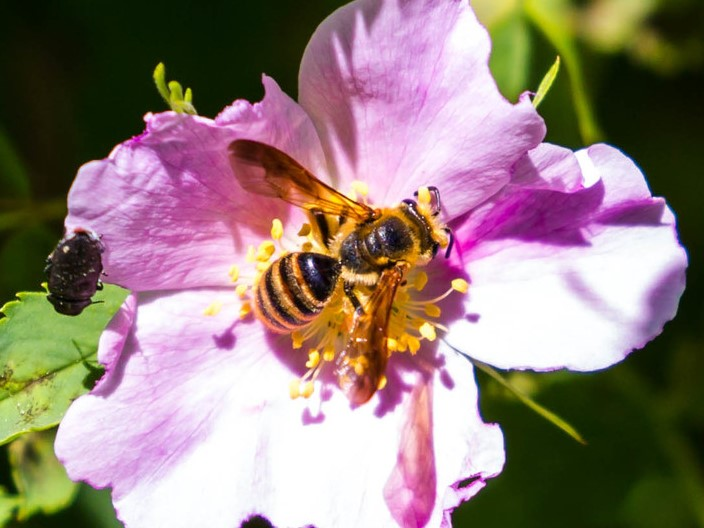

Scientific classification
- Kingdom: Animalia
- Phylum: Arthropoda
- Class: Insecta
- Order: Hymenoptera
- Family: Andrenidae
- Genus: Andrena
- Species: A. auricoma

Binomial name
- Andrena auricoma Smith, 1879

= Andrena auricoma =

Species of bee

The golden-haired miner bee (Andrena auricoma) is a species of miner bee in the family Andrenidae. The female bees are 8 to 10 mm in length, and males are 6 to 9 mm long. It is found in the western United States, and is relatively rare outside California. It looks very similar to the death camas miner bee (Andrena astragali) but is smaller.
