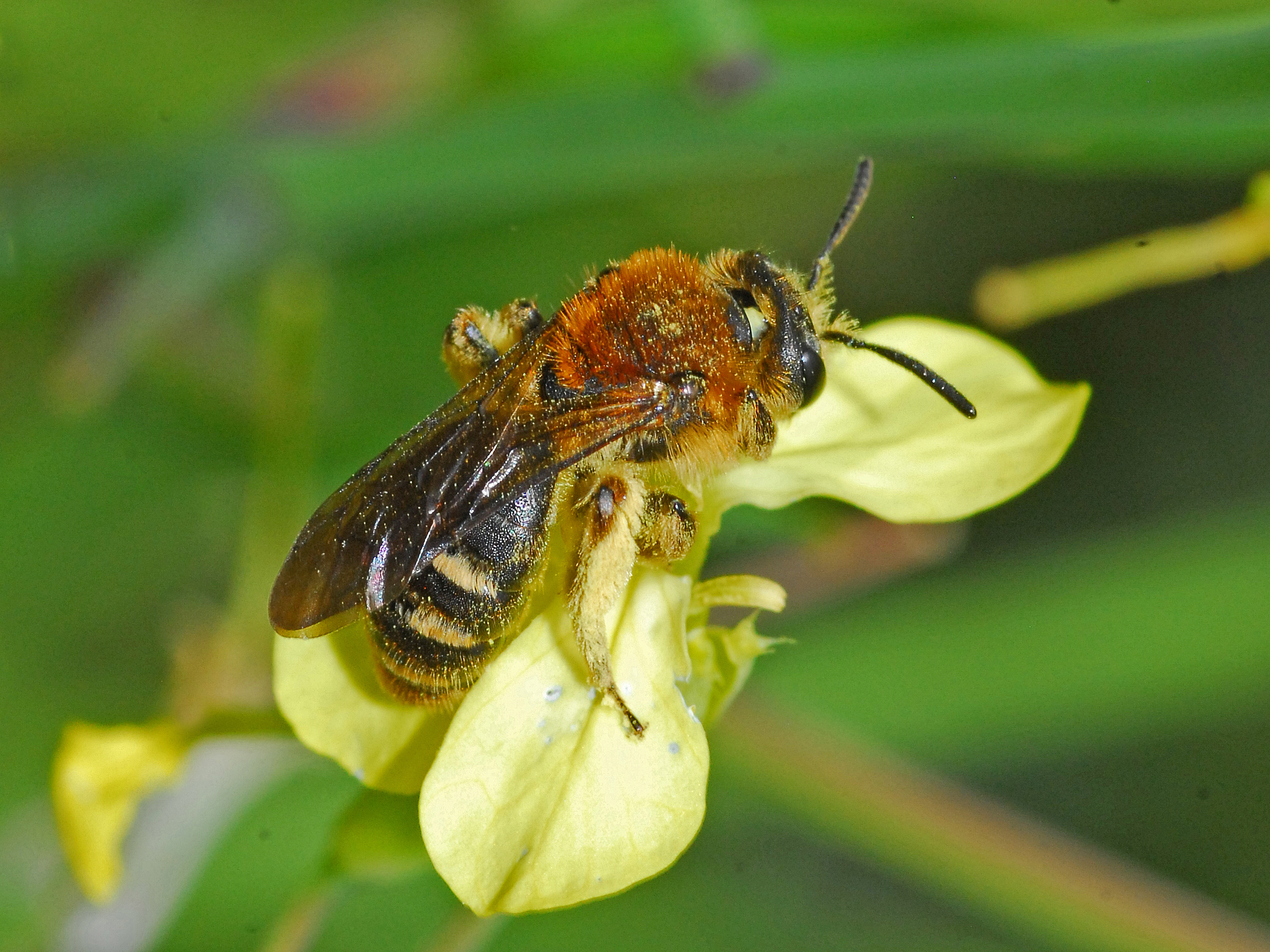
- Andrena (Biareolina) lagopus

Scientific classification
- Kingdom: Animalia
- Phylum: Arthropoda
- Class: Insecta
- Order: Hymenoptera
- Family: Andrenidae
- Genus: Andrena
- Species: A. lagopus

Binomial name
- Andrena lagopus Latreille, 1809

Synonyms
- Andrena neglecta Latreille, 1809

= Andrena lagopus =

Species of bee

Andrena lagopus is a species of mining bees belonging to the family of Andrenidae.

== Taxonomy ==
The subgenus Biareolina Dours, 1873 - created especially for the characteristic of two-celled forewings - included only one species, Andrena lagopus, as other species are now included in Scrapteropsis and Trachandrena.

== Distribution ==
This species is present in the palearctic realm (Austria, France, Germany, Hungary, Italy, Poland, Slovenia, Spain, Switzerland, Yugoslavia, North Africa and in Northern Asia, excluding China).

== Habitat ==
This thermophile species prefers areas below 500 m. It can be found from the end of April to the end of June in rape fields, arable fields, meadows, and gardens. These bees mainly feed on nectar of Brassicaceae (Brassica napus, Barbarea vulgaris and Cardamine pratensis) and Caryophyllaceae (Silene gallica). Larvae feed on pollen and nectar. The nests are made in places with little vegetation on the ground.

== Description ==
Andrena lagopus can reach a body length of about8–10 mm (0.31–0.39 in) in males, of 9–10 mm (0.35–0.39 in) in females. These mining bees have the chest covered with red hair, while the abdomen is blackish, with fine bands of white hairs at the ends of the tergites. Females of these membrane-winged bees have the forewings with only two submarginal cells, unlike those of all other Andrena species. Their brushes are beige.
