= Andrena hadfieldi =

Scientific classification
- Domain: Eukaryota
- Kingdom: Animalia
- Phylum: Arthropoda
- Class: Insecta
- Order: Hymenoptera
- Family: Andrenidae
- Genus: Andrena
- Species: A. hadfieldi

Binomial name
- Andrena hadfieldi Sheffield, 2020

Species of bee

Andrena hadfieldi is a species of bee in the family Andrenidae that resides in the Southwestern United States, named in honor of retired Canadian Astronaut Chris Hadfield. Its discovery is based on a single holotype, initially collected in 1989 but re-examined in 2020.
