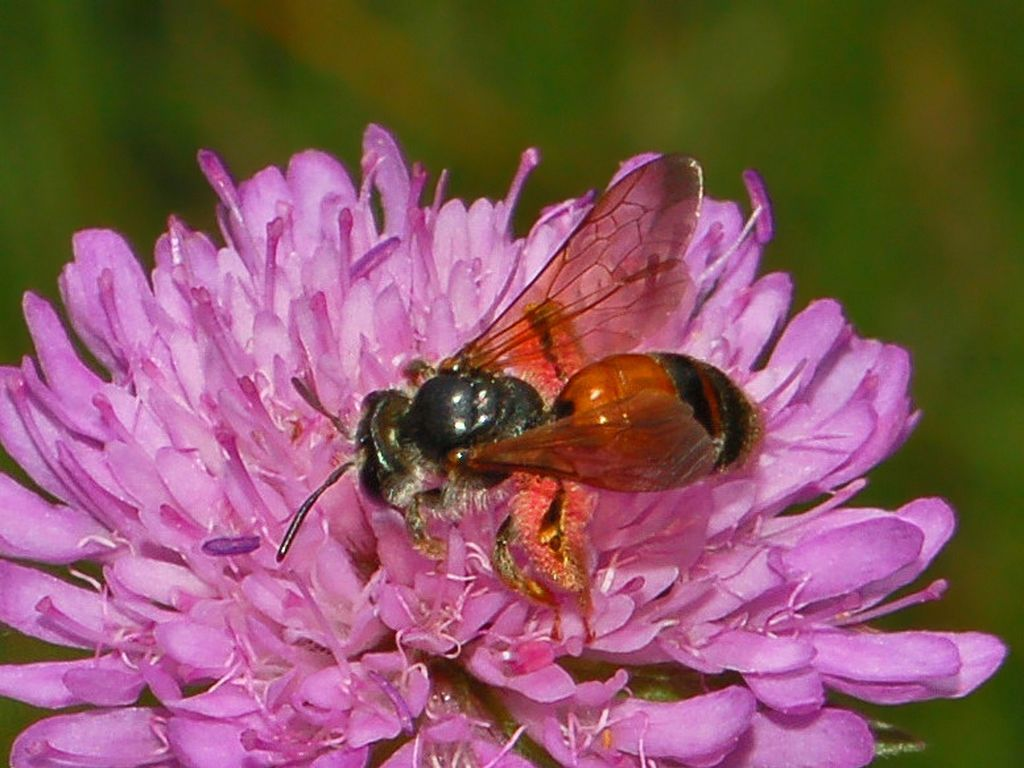
- Andrena hattorfiana – Female

Scientific classification
- Kingdom: Animalia
- Phylum: Arthropoda
- Clade: Pancrustacea
- Class: Insecta
- Order: Hymenoptera
- Family: Andrenidae
- Genus: Andrena
- Species: A. hattorfiana

Binomial name
- Andrena hattorfiana (Fabricius, 1775)

= Andrena hattorfiana =

Species of bee

Andrena hattorfiana is a species of mining bees belonging to the family Andrenidae subfamily Andreninae.

== Description ==
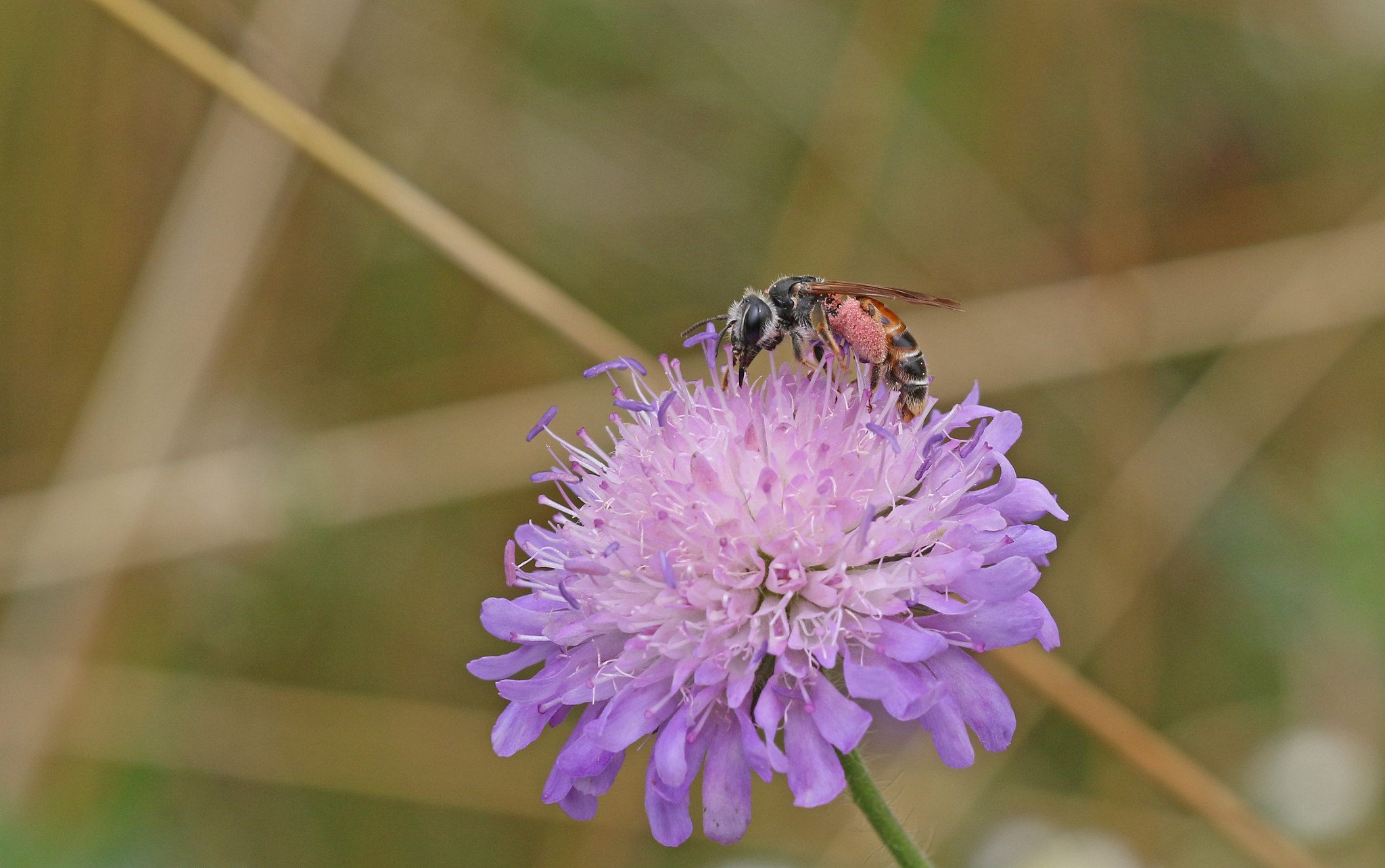
Large Scabious Mining Bee (Andrena hattorfiana), Hohenwart, Germany, July 2021

The adults grow up to 13–16 millimetres (0.51–0.63 in) long. They have a black-brown body with sparse light hair, while the first and the second abdominal segment are reddish. The females have a pollen basket of curved hairs on the sides of the thorax.

== Range ==
This endangered solitary bee is present in most of Europe and in the Near East. From central Spain via Ukraine to the Urals and via Asia Minor to the Caucasus; north to southern England and south Wales, in Norway and Sweden to 60.5 ° N, in Finland to 62.5 ° N, in Russia to Perm, south to Sicily, Peloponnese and southern Turkey; not in Crete. In the eastern Mediterranean area (westwards to Sicily) the ssp. dimidiata BRULLE, 1832 occurs. The species is generally uncommon.

== Habitat ==
Dry nutrient rich and poor meadows, flood dams, road embankments, forest edges. From the lowlands to the montane elevation.

== Ecology ==
Andrena hattorfiana is an oligolectic species, feeding on cardiac plants (Dipsacaceae); The main pollen source in the area is Knautia arvensis, the secondary pollen source is Knautia dipsacifolia. If the Knautia already wither before the end of the flight time, pollen of Scabiosa columbaria is also collected. It is a solitary bee that can be seen easily from up to 5 meters away. It can be encountered from May through August.

The females usually lay eggs in a nest excavated by themselves in sandy soils. Nest has five to ten brood cells, each having one egg and pollen as food for the larva. Every day there is one offspring produced in good weather conditions for foraging, and five to ten in a lifetime. These nests are made in dry parts of a traditionally managed hay field in medium pressure horse-graze pastures with sparse vegetation and on human-trampled paths. These bees rely heavily on pollen, that is almost like a species saving resource. The critical pollen resource for 10 reproducing Andrena hattorfiana ♀ varied from 27 to 361 plant individuals. Therefore, being able to get pollen from only one flower may have helped lead this species to the endangerment of being extinct.

With the specific conditions in which a nest must be made could have aided in bringing this species closer to being endangered of being extinct. Furthermore, this species is endangered as these bees are often infected by a host specific cleptoparasite called Nomada armata which parasitizes a big proportion of brood cells in local populations. Other factors are the competition for pollen by other insects, and habitat loss and fragmentation. But the main reason is the reduced food-plant distribution because of larger farm units and not a lot of traditionally managed meadows.

Therefore, Andrena hattorfiana is endangered because of pollen competition, not enough variability in their habitat, and because of there not being enough traditionally managed meadows.

Parasites: Cuckoo bee is Nomada armata. Adults are sometimes infested with strepsiptera (Stylops melittae).

== Etymology ==
Dedicated to Baron (?) Von Hattorf, from whose collection the specimen described by Fabricius comes from.

== Taxonomy ==
Subgenus Charitandrena HEDICKE, 1933.
