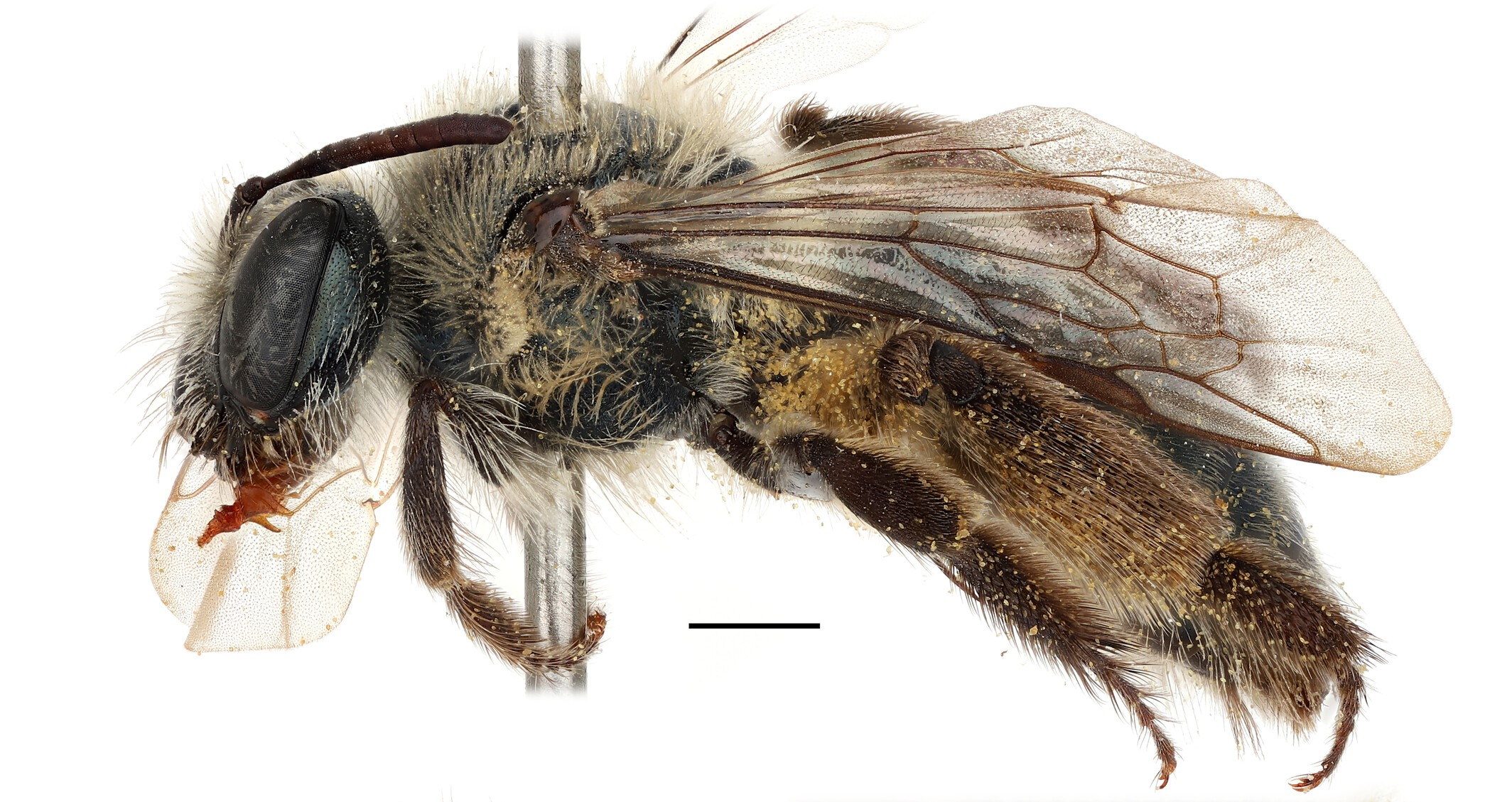
- Side view of a female Andrena androfovea

Scientific classification
- Kingdom: Animalia
- Phylum: Arthropoda
- Clade: Pancrustacea
- Class: Insecta
- Order: Hymenoptera
- Family: Andrenidae
- Genus: Andrena
- Species: A. androfovea

Binomial name
- Andrena androfovea Neff, Bossert & Hung, 2024

= Andrena androfovea =

Species of bee

Andrena androfovea is a species of miner bee in the family Andrenidae from Texas and Oklahoma, characterized by its metallic dark blue to blue-green and distinctive coarse punctation. First observed in the late 1980s, it was formally described as a new species in 2024. Genetic analyses revealed that Andrena androfovea represents a distinct lineage within the genus Andrena, leading to the creation of a new subgenus. Unique among Andrena species, Andrena androfovea primarily feeds on flowers of the family Solanaceae.

== Taxonomy and phylogenetics ==
Andrena androfovea is a member of the hyperdiverse genus Andrena, which contains approximately 1700 described species. The specific epithet "androfovea" is a combination of the words "Andrena" and "fovea", in reference to the punctation present on the male bee's head, a rare trait in North American members of the genus. Phylogenetic analyses reveal that Andrena androfovea represents a distinct lineage of Andrena that diverged from its closest known relatives around 12.6 million years ago. Therefore, the subgenus Foveoandrena was created to accommodate the genetic and morphological distinctiveness of the species.

== Description ==
Andrena androfovea primarily displays a metallic dark blue to metallic blue-green coloration. It can be separated from other similarly colored North American Andrena by the following characteristics in both sexes: the scutum and metasomal terga are coarsely punctate and the forewing possesses three submarginal cells. Additionally, the males possess small but distinct foveae on the head, short mandibles, and a reduced pygidial plate. Females possess distinct brushes of hair on the sternum. The average body length is 7.1 mm.

== Biology and distribution ==
Andrena androfovea appears to be a specialized pollinator of certain plants in the family Solanaceae, namely species in the genera Chamaesaracha and Quincula. This specialization is supported by direct observation and pollen analysis from captured females, whose pollen loads consisted nearly entirely of these two genera. Andrena androfovea collects pollen by scraping flower anthers with the inner surface of the midleg basitarsus, during which the pollen is transferred to hairs on the underside of the abdomen as well as hairs on the hind tibia.

Andrena androfovea has been observed in southwestern Oklahoma and southern, central, and western Texas.
