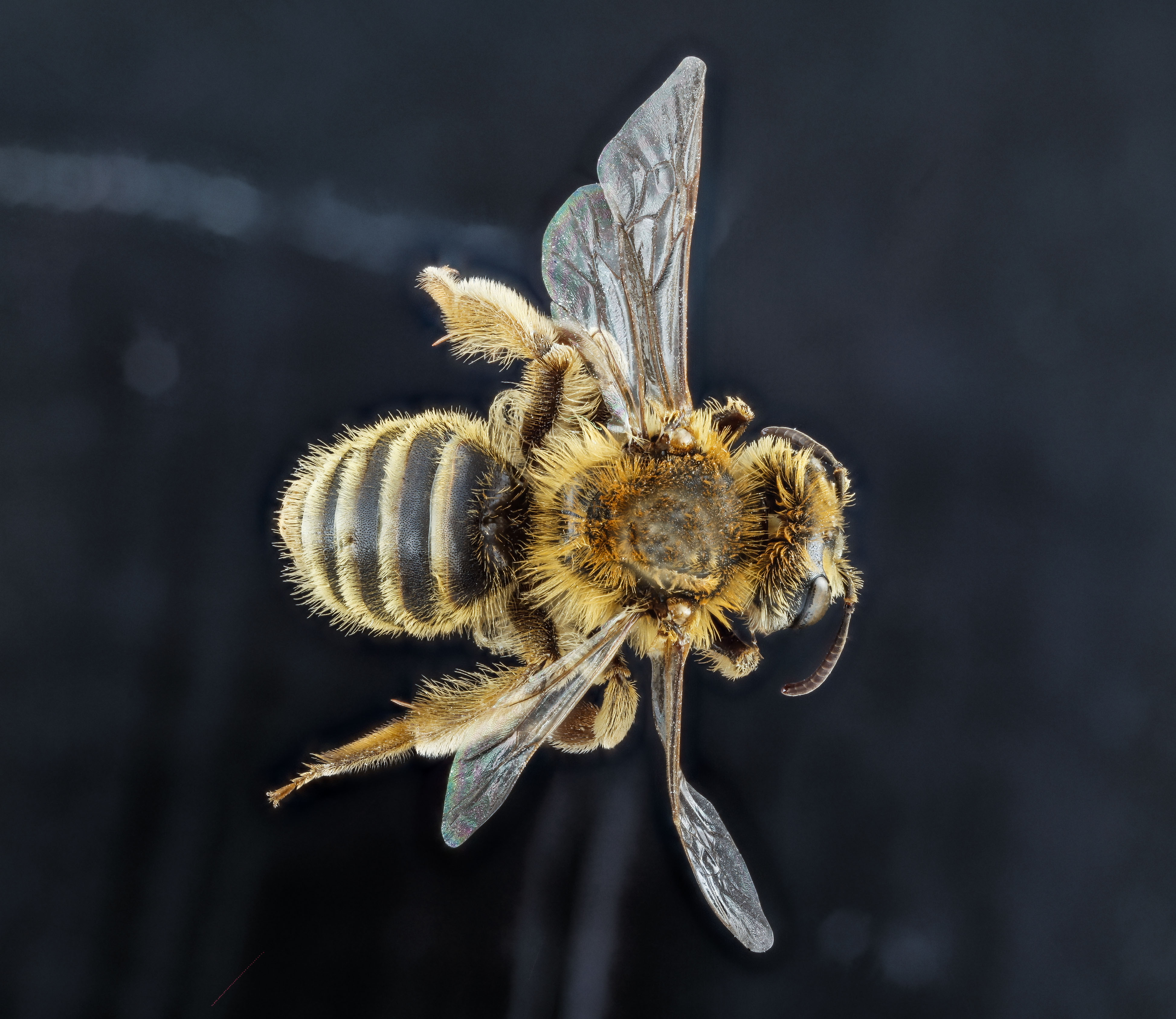

Scientific classification
- Kingdom: Animalia
- Phylum: Arthropoda
- Clade: Pancrustacea
- Class: Insecta
- Order: Hymenoptera
- Family: Andrenidae
- Genus: Andrena
- Species: A. accepta

Binomial name
- Andrena accepta Viereck, 1916

= Andrena accepta =

Species of bee

The two-spotted miner bee (Andrena accepta) is a species of miner bee in the family Andrenidae. It is found in Central America and North America. Members of the species have communal nests made of many cells. They live in desert scrub habitat. Their primary host plants belong to the genus Helianthus.
