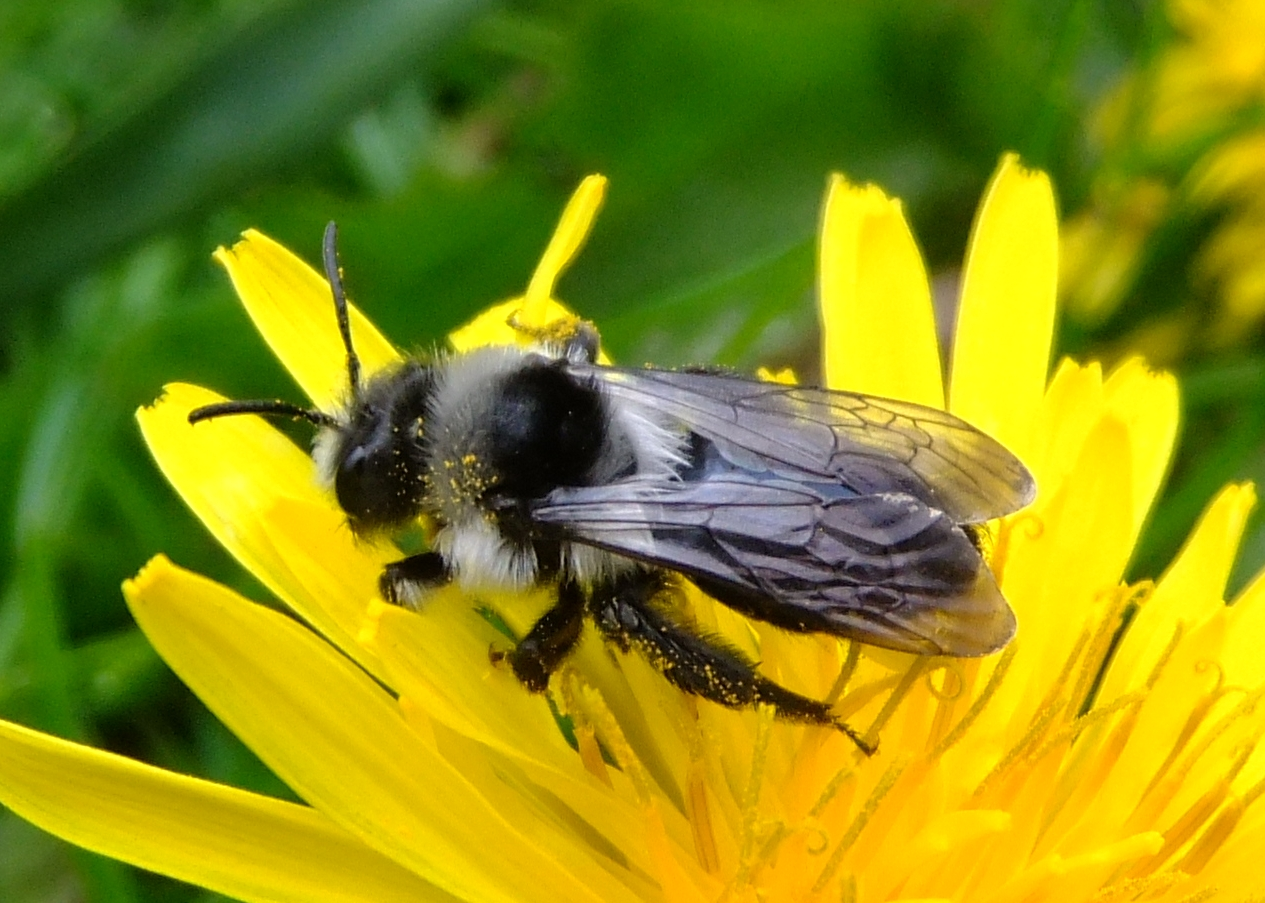

Scientific classification
- Kingdom: Animalia
- Phylum: Arthropoda
- Clade: Pancrustacea
- Class: Insecta
- Order: Hymenoptera
- Family: Andrenidae
- Genus: Andrena
- Species: A. cineraria

Binomial name
- Andrena cineraria (Linnaeus, 1758)

Synonyms
- Andrena danuvia E.Stöckhert, 1950

= Ashy mining bee =

Species of bee

The ashy mining bee (Andrena cineraria), also known as the Danubian miner or grey mining bee, is a species of sand bee found in Europe. Its distinctive black, grey and white colouring makes it one of the most easily recognized of the genus. They are generally considered safe around children and pets because they are relatively docile, and their stingers are not long enough to penetrate human skin. They are generalists, they mostly pollinate fruit trees, daisies, buttercups, mustard plants and brambles.

== Description and identification ==
The females are black, with two broad grey hair bands across the thorax. The male is also black although the thorax is entirely covered with grey hairs. The male has a tuft of white hairs on the lower face and white hairs on all femora while the female has white hairs only on the front femora. The females have twelve segments to their antennae and the males have thirteen.

== Distribution and habitat ==
The ashy mining bee is common and widespread throughout Europe, ranging from Ireland across central Europe and into Scandinavia. They are common throughout the United Kingdom although less frequent in northern Scotland. They prefer to nest in tended lawns, flowerbeds, parkland, calcareous grassland, orchards and on the borders of agricultural land.

== Life cycle and nesting ==
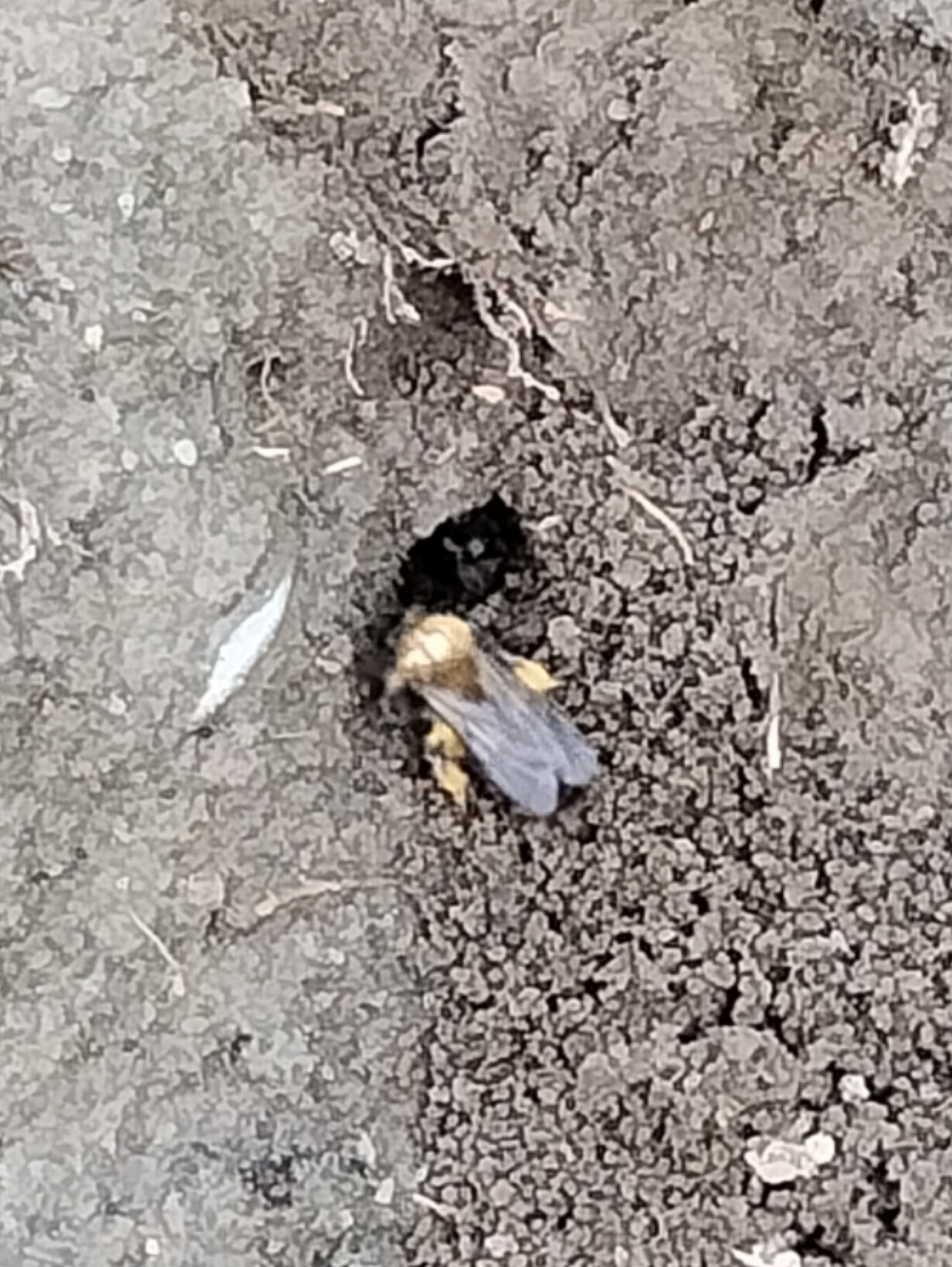
Female A. cineraria burrowing in Llanidloes, Powys, Wales.

Each female has her own nest and the ashy mining bee is therefore classified amongst solitary bees. The ashy mining bee flies from April until early June, most noticeably during the flowering periods of fruit trees, of which they are an important pollinator. They are also commonly seen hovering just above the ground after mating in spring. Following mating, the male dies and the female starts to build a nest. The nest is a simple burrow with several brood cells branching off it. The entrances to the burrows are identifiable by the conical mounds of excavated soil on the surface. The female fills the brood cells with a mixture of nectar and pollen, and lays one egg in each cell. The larva hatches within a few days, grows quickly and pupates within a few weeks. The adults emerge the following spring after hibernation. The male emerges before the female. The nests are frequently invaded by cleptoparasitic "cuckoo bees".
