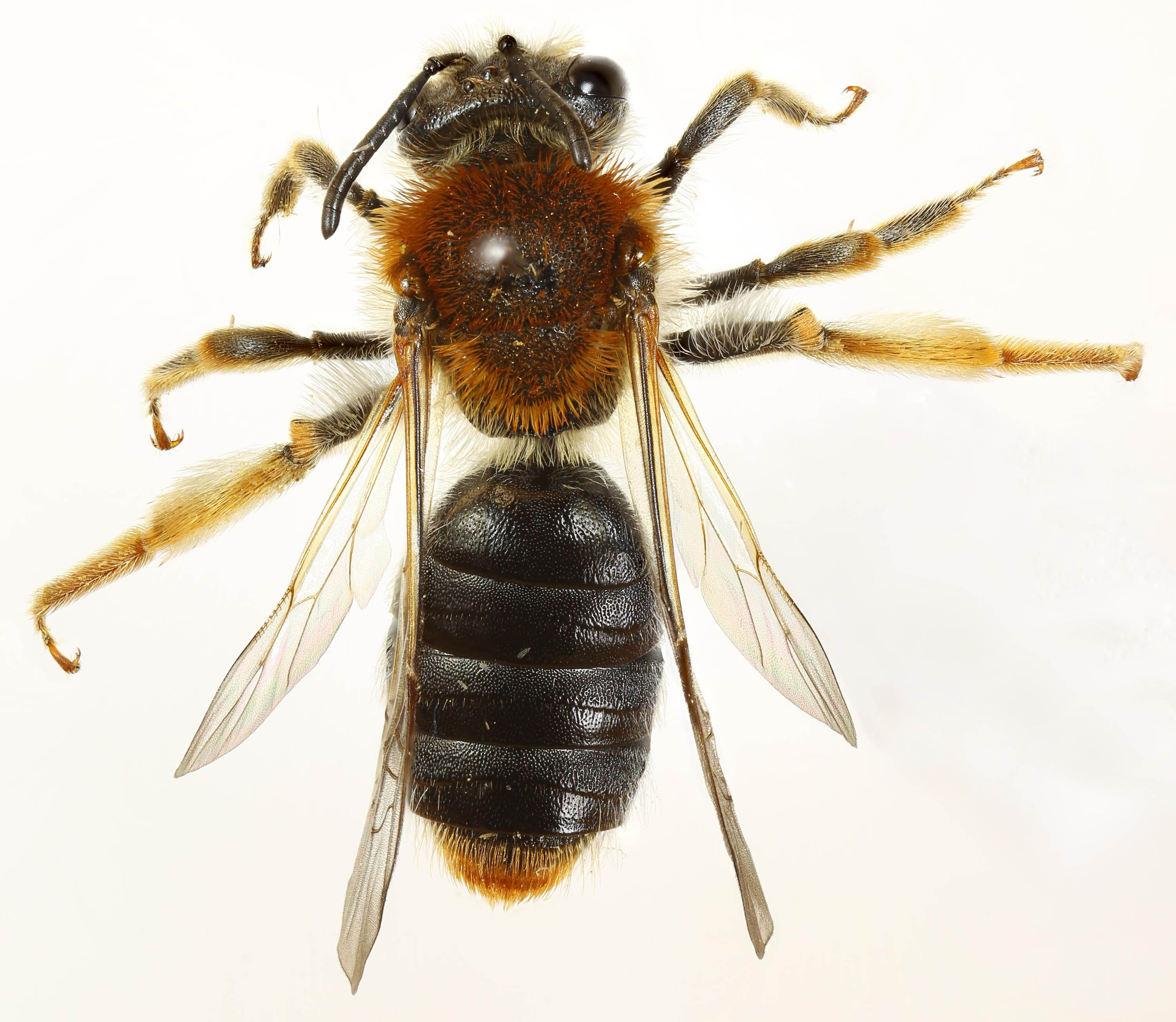
- Andrena haemorrhoa female, Minera, North Wales

Scientific classification
- Kingdom: Animalia
- Phylum: Arthropoda
- Clade: Pancrustacea
- Class: Insecta
- Order: Hymenoptera
- Family: Andrenidae
- Genus: Andrena
- Species: A. haemorrhoa

Binomial name
- Andrena haemorrhoa (Fabricius, 1781)

= Andrena haemorrhoa =

Species of bee

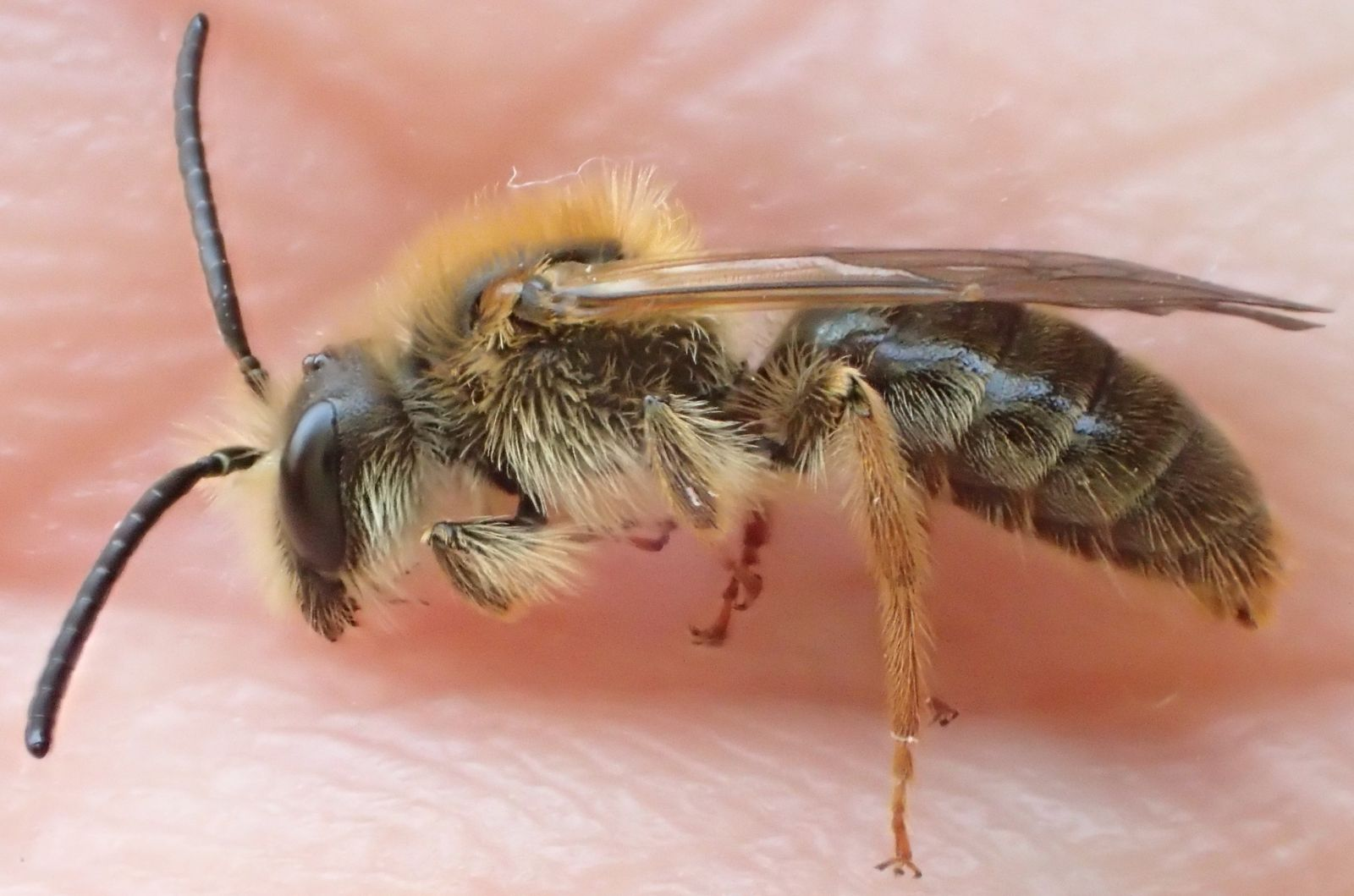
Andrena haemorrhoa male

Andrena haemorrhoa is a Palearctic species of mining bee.
