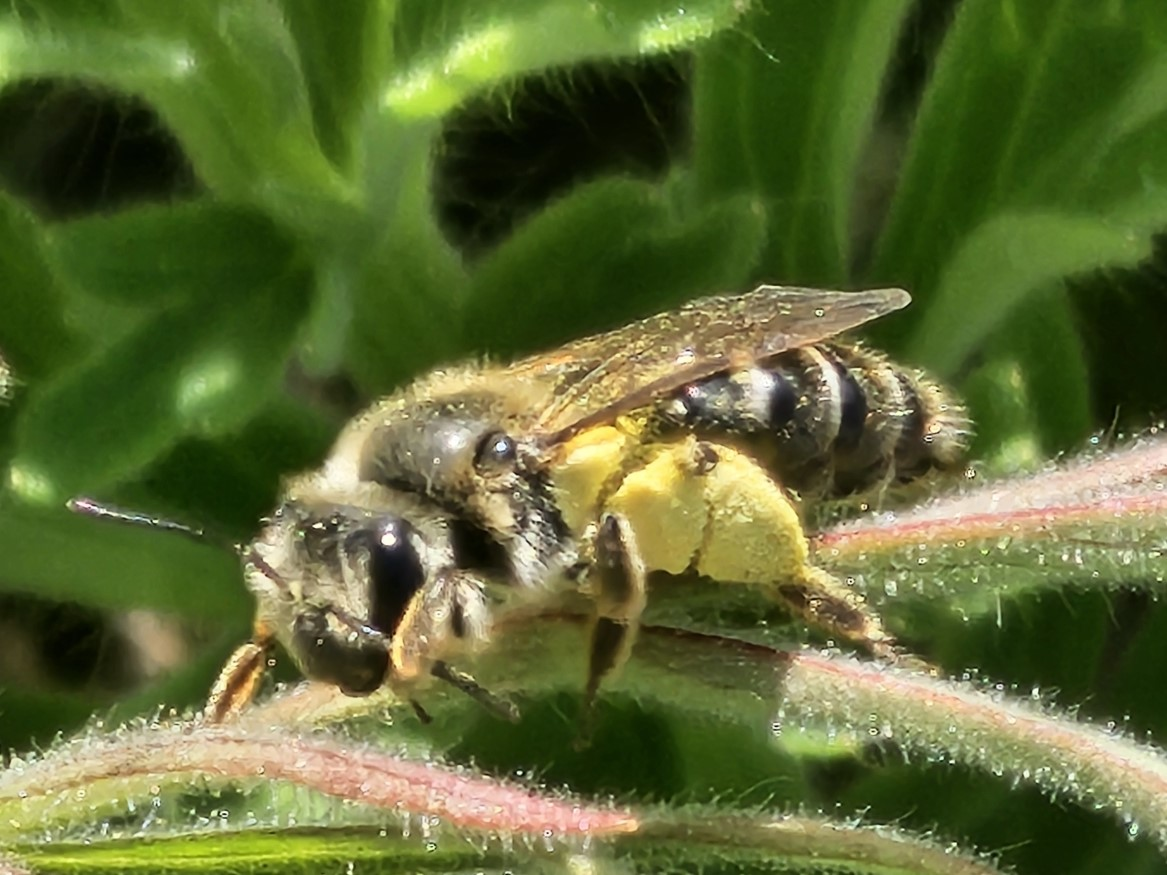

Scientific classification
- Kingdom: Animalia
- Phylum: Arthropoda
- Clade: Pancrustacea
- Class: Insecta
- Order: Hymenoptera
- Family: Andrenidae
- Genus: Andrena
- Species: A. angustitarsata

Binomial name
- Andrena angustitarsata Viereck, 1904

= Andrena angustitarsata =

Miner bee species in the family Andrenidae

The narrow-legged miner bee (Andrena angustitarsata) is a species of miner bee in the family Andrenidae. It is found in North America. It is a generalist forager that nonetheless exhibits a preference for pollen of flowers from the family Apiaceae.
