= List of Trypoxylon species =

This is a list of 636 species in the genus Trypoxylon.

== Trypoxylon species ==
- Trypoxylon abditum Arnold, 1924
- Trypoxylon accumulator F. Smith, 1875
- Trypoxylon acutangulum Arnold, 1951
- Trypoxylon aegyptium Kohl, 1906
- Trypoxylon aeneipenne Arnold, 1944
- Trypoxylon aestivale Richards, 1934
- Trypoxylon agamemnon Richards, 1934
- Trypoxylon albipes F. Smith, 1856
- Trypoxylon albispinosum Tsuneki, 1979
- Trypoxylon albitarsatum Tsuneki, 1977
- Trypoxylon albitarse Fabricius, 1804
- Trypoxylon albonigrum Richards, 1934
- Trypoxylon algoense Arnold, 1924
- Trypoxylon algoensis Arnold, 1924
- Trypoxylon alleni Richards, 1934
- Trypoxylon amankutanum Antropov, 1986
- Trypoxylon amatorium Tsuneki, 1980
- Trypoxylon ambiguum Tsuneki, 1956
- Trypoxylon anamalaiense Tsuneki, 1979
- Trypoxylon anapaike Amarante, 1991
- Trypoxylon angoramum Tsuneki, 1981
- Trypoxylon angustum Tsuneki, 1979
- Trypoxylon annulatum Brèthes, 1913
- Trypoxylon antennatum Tsuneki, 1979
- Trypoxylon antropovi Coville, 1985
- Trypoxylon aphelothoracicus Fu & Li, 2024
- Trypoxylon apicatum Tsuneki, 1979
- Trypoxylon apicipenne Cameron, 1889
- Trypoxylon apicum Tsuneki, 1980
- Trypoxylon appendiculatum Tsuneki, 1974
- Trypoxylon arabicum Gussakovskij, 1936
- Trypoxylon armatum Taschenberg, 1875
- Trypoxylon arnoldi Menke in Bohart and Menke, 1976
- Trypoxylon arroyense Richards, 1934
- Trypoxylon arudum Leclercq, 1965
- Trypoxylon ashmeadi Baltazar, 1966
- Trypoxylon asinum Leclercq, 1965
- Trypoxylon asuncicola Strand, 1910
- Trypoxylon atkinsoni Richards, 1934
- Trypoxylon atricorne Tsuneki, 1979
- Trypoxylon atrum Tsuneki, 1979
- Trypoxylon attenuatum F. Smith, 1851
- Trypoxylon aureovestitum Taschenberg, 1875
- Trypoxylon aurifrons Shuckard, 1837
- Trypoxylon auropilosum Tsuneki, 1976
- Trypoxylon bakeri Tsuneki, 1978
- Trypoxylon balabacense Tsuneki, 1976
- Trypoxylon balteatum Cameron, 1889
- Trypoxylon banahao Tsuneki, 1980
- Trypoxylon banoense Tsuneki, 1980
- Trypoxylon banvaneum Tsuneki, 1979
- Trypoxylon barberi Richards, 1934
- Trypoxylon barticense Richards, 1934
- Trypoxylon basilanense Tsuneki, 1980
- Trypoxylon basilanum Tsuneki, 1980
- Trypoxylon beaumonti Antropov, 1991
- Trypoxylon bellardi Richards, 1934
- Trypoxylon bellum Tsuneki, 1979
- Trypoxylon bensoni Richards, 1934
- Trypoxylon benten Tsuneki, 1979
- Trypoxylon betremi Tsuneki, 1979
- Trypoxylon bettotan Tsuneki, 1980
- Trypoxylon biarti Richards, 1934
- Trypoxylon bibou Tsuneki, 1981
- Trypoxylon bicolor F. Smith, 1856
- Trypoxylon bidentatum W. Fox, 1891
- Trypoxylon bidenticulatum Tsuneki, 1979
- Trypoxylon bifoveatum Tsuneki, 1979
- Trypoxylon bilobatum Tsuneki, 1961
- Trypoxylon biputeolum Tsuneki, 1979
- Trypoxylon bishopi Tsuneki, 1979
- Trypoxylon bismarckianum Tsuneki, 1977
- Trypoxylon bituberculatum Tsuneki, 1977
- Trypoxylon bogotense Richards, 1934
- Trypoxylon borneanum Tsuneki, 1980
- Trypoxylon bourgeoisi Strand, 1911
- Trypoxylon brasilianum de Saussure, 1867
- Trypoxylon braunsi Arnold, 1924
- Trypoxylon brethesi Gemignani, 1941
- Trypoxylon breviclypeatum Tsuneki, 1979
- Trypoxylon brevipenne de Saussure, 1867
- Trypoxylon breviventre Arnold, 1959
- Trypoxylon bridwelli Sandhouse, 1940
- Trypoxylon brunneimaculatum T. Li and Q. Li, 2007
- Trypoxylon bryanti Richards, 1934
- Trypoxylon buchwaldi Richards, 1934
- Trypoxylon buddha Cameron, 1889
- Trypoxylon buehleri Tsuneki, 1979
- Trypoxylon bukidnon Tsuneki, 1980
- Trypoxylon bum Tsuneki, 1981
- Trypoxylon burmaense Tsuneki, 1981
- Trypoxylon busckii Richards, 1934
- Trypoxylon cagrum Tsuneki, 1979
- Trypoxylon caldesianum Richards, 1934
- Trypoxylon californicum de Saussure, 1867
- Trypoxylon cameroni Tsuneki, 1980
- Trypoxylon cameronii Dalla Torre, 1897
- Trypoxylon canlaon Tsuneki, 1980
- Trypoxylon capense Cameron, 1905
- Trypoxylon capillatum Tsuneki, 1979
- Trypoxylon capitale Richards, 1934
- Trypoxylon carcinum Leclercq, 1965
- Trypoxylon carinatum Say, 1837
- Trypoxylon cariniceps Richards, 1934
- Trypoxylon carinifrons Cameron, 1889
- Trypoxylon cariosum Arnold, 1959
- Trypoxylon carpenteri Richards, 1933
- Trypoxylon castoris Leclercq, 1965
- Trypoxylon cataractae Arnold, 1924
- Trypoxylon catinum Leclercq, 1965
- Trypoxylon cavallum Leclercq, 1965
- Trypoxylon cavum Tsuneki, 1980
- Trypoxylon centrale W. Fox, 1895
- Trypoxylon cheesmanae Tsuneki, 1979
- Trypoxylon chichenitzae Coville, 1982
- Trypoxylon chichidzimaense Tsuneki, 1973
- Trypoxylon chichimecum de Saussure, 1867
- Trypoxylon chimbum Tsuneki, 1981
- Trypoxylon chingi Tsuneki, 1971
- Trypoxylon chirindense Arnold, 1936
- Trypoxylon choiseulense Tsuneki, 1981
- Trypoxylon chosenense Tsuneki, 1956
- Trypoxylon cidicum Tsuneki, 1980
- Trypoxylon cimmolum Tsuneki, 1980
- Trypoxylon cinctellum Richards, 1934
- Trypoxylon cindjun Tsuneki, 1980
- Trypoxylon clarkei Krombein, 1962
- Trypoxylon clavatum Say, 1837
- Trypoxylon clavicerum Lepeletier de Saint Fargeau and Audinet-Serville, 1828
- Trypoxylon clypeatum Tsuneki, 1979
- Trypoxylon clypeisinuatum T. Li and Q. Li, 2010
- Trypoxylon cocorite Richards, 1934
- Trypoxylon cognatum Cameron, 1897
- Trypoxylon collinsi Tsuneki, 1980
- Trypoxylon collinum F. Smith, 1856
- Trypoxylon coloratum F. Smith, 1858
- Trypoxylon compluvium Tsuneki, 1980
- Trypoxylon concinnum Tsuneki, 1979
- Trypoxylon confrater Kohl, 1894
- Trypoxylon cornigerum Cameron, 1889
- Trypoxylon correntium Brèthes, 1909
- Trypoxylon crassifrons Tsuneki, 1963
- Trypoxylon crassipes Tsuneki, 1981
- Trypoxylon crassipunctatum Arnold, 1946
- Trypoxylon crassiventre Tsuneki, 1979
- Trypoxylon cricetum Leclercq, 1965
- Trypoxylon crudele Richards, 1934
- Trypoxylon cubense Richards, 1934
- Trypoxylon cucurbitinum Tsuneki, 1978
- Trypoxylon culionum Tsuneki, 1980
- Trypoxylon curvicorne Tsuneki, 1979
- Trypoxylon curvum Tsuneki, 1980
- Trypoxylon daicoccum Tsuneki, 1979
- Trypoxylon darium Leclercq, 1965
- Trypoxylon darjeeling Tsuneki, 1980
- Trypoxylon deceptorium Antropov, 1991
- Trypoxylon dendrophilum Arnold, 1959
- Trypoxylon dentatum Tsuneki, 1981
- Trypoxylon deuterium Leclercq, 1965
- Trypoxylon djampangense Tsuneki, 1979
- Trypoxylon djun Tsuneki, 1980
- Trypoxylon dubium Coville, 1982
- Trypoxylon duckei Richards, 1934
- Trypoxylon dyeri Richards, 1934
- Trypoxylon ebneri Maidl, 1924
- Trypoxylon eburneipes Tsuneki, 1977
- Trypoxylon ecuadorium Richards, 1934
- Trypoxylon egregium Arnold, 1959
- Trypoxylon elegantulum F. Smith, 1860
- Trypoxylon elgonense Arnold, 1956
- Trypoxylon elongatum F. Smith, 1856
- Trypoxylon emdeni Richards, 1934
- Trypoxylon emeritum Leclercq, 1965
- Trypoxylon errans de Saussure, 1867
- Trypoxylon erythrozonatum Cameron, 1901
- Trypoxylon eugeniae Gussakovskij, 1936
- Trypoxylon evansi Coville, 1982
- Trypoxylon excavatum F. Smith, 1856
- Trypoxylon excellens Strand, 1910
- Trypoxylon exiguum Tsuneki, 1956
- Trypoxylon eximium F. Smith, 1859
- Trypoxylon eyeni Leclercq, 1965
- Trypoxylon fabricator F. Smith, 1873
- Trypoxylon fastigium W. Fox, 1894
- Trypoxylon fenchihuense Tsuneki, 1967
- Trypoxylon ferox F. Smith, 1860
- Trypoxylon ferrugatum Tsuneki, 1979
- Trypoxylon ferrugiabdominale T. Li and Q. Li, 2007
- Trypoxylon ferrugineipes Fu & Li, 2024
- Trypoxylon ferrugineum Tsuneki, 1979
- Trypoxylon fiebrigi Richards, 1934
- Trypoxylon figulus (Linnaeus, 1758)
- Trypoxylon fitzgeraldi Richards, 1934
- Trypoxylon flagellatum Tsuneki, 1980
- Trypoxylon flavimanum Arnold, 1946
- Trypoxylon flavipes Tsuneki, 1979
- Trypoxylon flavofasciatum Tsuneki, 1980
- Trypoxylon fletcheri R. Turner, 1918
- Trypoxylon florale Richards, 1934
- Trypoxylon formosicola Strand, 1922
- Trypoxylon fortius Tsuneki, 1979
- Trypoxylon foveatum Cameron, 1904
- Trypoxylon fractum Richards, 1934
- Trypoxylon freidbergi Antropov, 1989
- Trypoxylon frigidum F. Smith, 1856
- Trypoxylon frioense Richards, 1934
- Trypoxylon frontale F. Smith, 1856
- Trypoxylon fronticorne Gussakovskij, 1936
- Trypoxylon fruticicola Tsuneki, 1981
- Trypoxylon fugax Fabricius, 1804
- Trypoxylon fulviventre Tsuneki, 1979
- Trypoxylon fulvocollare Cameron, 1904
- Trypoxylon fumi Tsuneki, 1979
- Trypoxylon funatui Tsuneki, 1963
- Trypoxylon fuscipenne Fabricius, 1804
- Trypoxylon gallopavo Antropov, 1994
- Trypoxylon gampahae Tsuneki, 1981
- Trypoxylon gentingense Tsuneki, 1981
- Trypoxylon giganteum Tsuneki, 1980
- Trypoxylon gounellei Richards, 1934
- Trypoxylon gracilescens F. Smith, 1860
- Trypoxylon gracilicorne Arnold, 1946
- Trypoxylon grenadense Richards, 1934
- Trypoxylon gressitti Tsuneki, 1979
- Trypoxylon guadalense Tsuneki, 1981
- Trypoxylon guassu Amarante, 2002
- Trypoxylon guichardi Antropov, 1994
- Trypoxylon gussachaos Menke in Bohart and Menke, 1976
- Trypoxylon gustatum Leclercq, 1965
- Trypoxylon halcon Tsuneki, 1980
- Trypoxylon himachalense Tsuneki, 1979
- Trypoxylon hollandiae Tsuneki, 1981
- Trypoxylon hollisi Tsuneki, 1980
- Trypoxylon hova de Saussure, 1892
- Trypoxylon hyperorientale Strand, 1922
- Trypoxylon imayoshii Yasumatsu, 1938
- Trypoxylon inconstans Arnold, 1946
- Trypoxylon indianum Tsuneki, 1979
- Trypoxylon infimum Arnold, 1940
- Trypoxylon infoveatum T. Li and Q. Li, 2007
- Trypoxylon inopinatum Antropov, 1986
- Trypoxylon insolitum W. Fox, 1897
- Trypoxylon insulare Tsuneki, 1976
- Trypoxylon insulsum Arnold, 1959
- Trypoxylon interruptum Tsuneki, 1978
- Trypoxylon iriomotense Tsuneki, 1981
- Trypoxylon jacobsoni Tsuneki, 1979
- Trypoxylon javanense Tsuneki, 1979
- Trypoxylon javanicum Tsuneki, 1979
- Trypoxylon joergenseni Brèthes, 1910
- Trypoxylon johnsoni W. Fox, 1891
- Trypoxylon judicum Leclercq, 1965
- Trypoxylon kabeyae Leclercq, 1965
- Trypoxylon kachin Tsuneki, 1981
- Trypoxylon kaitum Tsuneki, 1981
- Trypoxylon kalabakan Tsuneki, 1980
- Trypoxylon kalilicum Tsuneki, 1981
- Trypoxylon kalimantan Menke in Bohart and Menke, 1976
- Trypoxylon kambaitium Tsuneki, 1981
- Trypoxylon kandyianum Tsuneki, 1979
- Trypoxylon kansitakum Tsuneki, 1971
- Trypoxylon kapiricum Leclercq, 1965
- Trypoxylon karimui Tsuneki, 1981
- Trypoxylon kashmirense Tsuneki, 1979
- Trypoxylon katangae Leclercq, 1965
- Trypoxylon katsuuense Tsuneki, 1984
- Trypoxylon kedah Tsuneki, 1979
- Trypoxylon kepongianum Tsuneki, 1979
- Trypoxylon khasiae Cameron, 1904
- Trypoxylon kinabalum Tsuneki, 1980
- Trypoxylon kitulgalaense Tsuneki, 1981
- Trypoxylon klapperichi Balthasar, 1957
- Trypoxylon kodamanum Tsuneki, 1972
- Trypoxylon kohli Arnold, 1924
- Trypoxylon koikense Tsuneki, 1956
- Trypoxylon kokodaense Tsuneki, 1981
- Trypoxylon kolambuganum Tsuneki, 1980
- Trypoxylon kolazyi Kohl, 1893
- Trypoxylon kolthoffi Gussakovskij, 1938
- Trypoxylon koma Tsuneki, 1956
- Trypoxylon konosuense Tsuneki, 1968
- Trypoxylon koreanum Tsuneki, 1956
- Trypoxylon koshunicon Strand, 1922
- Trypoxylon kostylevi Antropov, 1985
- Trypoxylon krombeini Tsuneki, 1979
- Trypoxylon kuchingense Tsuneki, 1980
- Trypoxylon kuncheriai Tsuneki, 1980
- Trypoxylon kunzui Tsuneki, 1981
- Trypoxylon kutuense Tsuneki, 1979
- Trypoxylon kyotoense Tsuneki, 1966
- Trypoxylon lactitarse de Saussure, 1867
- Trypoxylon lacustre Arnold, 1956
- Trypoxylon lae Tsuneki, 1981
- Trypoxylon laeve W. Fox, 1897
- Trypoxylon laeviceps Tsuneki, 1976
- Trypoxylon laevidorsum Tsuneki, 1979
- Trypoxylon laevifrons F. Smith, 1873
- Trypoxylon lagunaense Tsuneki, 1980
- Trypoxylon lamellatum Tsuneki, 1979
- Trypoxylon langkawiense Tsuneki, 1979
- Trypoxylon laosense Tsuneki, 1979
- Trypoxylon laosianum Tsuneki, 1979
- Trypoxylon latilobatum Antropov, 1991
- Trypoxylon latiscutatum Arnold, 1946
- Trypoxylon latro Menke and Richards in Matthews, 1983
- Trypoxylon layouanum Evans, 1972
- Trypoxylon lenkoi Amarante, 1991
- Trypoxylon leptogaster Kohl, 1894
- Trypoxylon letiferum Arnold, 1946
- Trypoxylon leucarthrum Richards, 1934
- Trypoxylon licimum Tsuneki, 1980
- Trypoxylon lieftincki Tsuneki, 1981
- Trypoxylon lissonotum Cameron, 1910
- Trypoxylon lobatifrons Tsuneki, 1979
- Trypoxylon longicorne Tsuneki, 1977
- Trypoxylon longipes Tsuneki, 1979
- Trypoxylon longipilosum Tsuneki, 1979
- Trypoxylon longiscute Tsuneki, 1978
- Trypoxylon lucidipes Tsuneki, 1980
- Trypoxylon lucidum Arnold, 1959
- Trypoxylon lumpurense Tsuneki, 1979
- Trypoxylon lusingum Leclercq, 1965
- Trypoxylon luteitarse de Saussure, 1867
- Trypoxylon luteocollare Tsuneki, 1980
- Trypoxylon luteosignatum Arnold, 1945
- Trypoxylon luzonense Tsuneki, 1980
- Trypoxylon lynchi Brèthes, 1913
- Trypoxylon maai Tsuneki, 1979
- Trypoxylon mabwense Leclercq, 1965
- Trypoxylon maculipes Tsuneki, 1979
- Trypoxylon maculiventre Tsuneki, 1979
- Trypoxylon mafuluense Tsuneki, 1981
- Trypoxylon magrettii Gribodo, 1884
- Trypoxylon maidli Richards, 1934
- Trypoxylon makassarense Tsuneki, 1980
- Trypoxylon makiling Tsuneki, 1980
- Trypoxylon malaisei Gussakovskij, 1932
- Trypoxylon malaiseiellum Tsuneki, 1981
- Trypoxylon malaitae Tsuneki, 1981
- Trypoxylon malayanum Tsuneki, 1979
- Trypoxylon mandibulatum Richards, 1933
- Trypoxylon manni Richards, 1934
- Trypoxylon marginatum Cameron, 1912
- Trypoxylon marginifrons Cameron, 1912
- Trypoxylon martium Tsuneki, 1979
- Trypoxylon massaicum Cameron, 1908
- Trypoxylon matheranicum Tsuneki, 1979
- Trypoxylon mayri Richards, 1934
- Trypoxylon mazaruni Richards, 1934
- Trypoxylon medipolitum Tsuneki, 1979
- Trypoxylon medium de Beaumont, 1945
- Trypoxylon megriense Antropov, 1985
- Trypoxylon melanocorne Strand, 1922
- Trypoxylon melanoleucum Richards, 1934
- Trypoxylon melanurum Cameron, 1901
- Trypoxylon membranaceum Tsuneki, 1979
- Trypoxylon menkeanum Coville, 1982
- Trypoxylon menkei Tsuneki, 1979
- Trypoxylon mexicanum de Saussure, 1867
- Trypoxylon mico Tsuneki, 1979
- Trypoxylon mindanaonis Tsuneki, 1976
- Trypoxylon miniovatum Tsuneki, 1980
- Trypoxylon minus de Beaumont, 1945
- Trypoxylon minutum Tsuneki, 1979
- Trypoxylon mishimaense Tsuneki, 1986
- Trypoxylon mojuba Amarante, 1995
- Trypoxylon moluccanum Tsuneki, 1980
- Trypoxylon monstrificum Kohl, 1905
- Trypoxylon monteverdeae Coville, 1982
- Trypoxylon montivagum Arnold, 1940
- Trypoxylon moraballi Richards, 1934
- Trypoxylon morobense Tsuneki, 1981
- Trypoxylon mulusanum Tsuneki, 1980
- Trypoxylon mutatum Kohl, 1885
- Trypoxylon mutilatum Richards, 1934
- Trypoxylon myitkyinae Tsuneki, 1981
- Trypoxylon nambui Tsuneki, 1966
- Trypoxylon nasale Tsuneki, 1980
- Trypoxylon nathani Tsuneki, 1979
- Trypoxylon nattereri Richards, 1934
- Trypoxylon naviforme Tsuneki, 1979
- Trypoxylon nesianum Tsuneki, 1979
- Trypoxylon ngum Tsuneki, 1979
- Trypoxylon nigricorne Tsuneki, 1979
- Trypoxylon nigrifemur Tsuneki, 1979
- Trypoxylon nigripes Tsuneki, 1979
- Trypoxylon nigrispine Cameron, 1905
- Trypoxylon nilgiriense Tsuneki, 1979
- Trypoxylon nipponicum Tsuneki, 1956
- Trypoxylon nishidai Tsuneki, 1979
- Trypoxylon nitidissimum Richards, 1934
- Trypoxylon nitidum F. Smith, 1856
- Trypoxylon niveitarse de Saussure, 1867
- Trypoxylon nodosicorne R. Turner, 1917
- Trypoxylon nodosum Arnold, 1944
- Trypoxylon novaguineae Tsuneki, 1981
- Trypoxylon oaxacae Coville, 1982
- Trypoxylon obidense Richards, 1934
- Trypoxylon obiense Tsuneki, 1980
- Trypoxylon occidentale Coville, 1982
- Trypoxylon oculare Menke, 1968
- Trypoxylon okinawanum Tsuneki, 1966
- Trypoxylon olfersi Richards, 1934
- Trypoxylon olthofi Tsuneki, 1981
- Trypoxylon opacum Brèthes, 1913
- Trypoxylon operculum Tsuneki, 1979
- Trypoxylon optimum Richards, 1934
- Trypoxylon ordinarium Richards, 1934
- Trypoxylon orientale Cameron, 1904
- Trypoxylon orientinum Richards, 1969
- Trypoxylon oriomonis Tsuneki, 1981
- Trypoxylon orizabense Richards, 1934
- Trypoxylon ornatigaster Tsuneki, 1979
- Trypoxylon outang Tsuneki, 1980
- Trypoxylon owrichardsi Tsuneki, 1981
- Trypoxylon pachygaster Richards, 1934
- Trypoxylon pacificum Gussakovskij, 1932
- Trypoxylon paeninsulicola Tsuneki, 1979
- Trypoxylon pagdeni Tsuneki, 1979
- Trypoxylon paglianoi Antropov, 1991
- Trypoxylon pahangense Tsuneki, 1979
- Trypoxylon palawanum Tsuneki, 1976
- Trypoxylon pan Arnold, 1956
- Trypoxylon panitianum Tsuneki, 1980
- Trypoxylon papa Antropov, 1994
- Trypoxylon papuanum Tsuneki, 1977
- Trypoxylon parvulum Tsuneki, 1979
- Trypoxylon parvum Schrottky, 1902
- Trypoxylon patruele Arnold, 1924
- Trypoxylon paulisum Leclercq, 1965
- Trypoxylon paulum Tsuneki, 1980
- Trypoxylon pectorale Richards, 1934
- Trypoxylon peltopse Kohl, 1906
- Trypoxylon pendleburyi Tsuneki, 1979
- Trypoxylon pennsylvanicum de Saussure, 1867
- Trypoxylon pentheri Richards, 1934
- Trypoxylon personatum Amarante, 1991
- Trypoxylon petiolatum F. Smith, 1858
- Trypoxylon petioloides Strand, 1922
- Trypoxylon pileatum F. Smith, 1856
- Trypoxylon pilosum Tsuneki, 1979
- Trypoxylon pinguiceps Tsuneki, 1977
- Trypoxylon placidum F. Smith, 1863
- Trypoxylon planifrons Tsuneki, 1977
- Trypoxylon platense Brèthes, 1913
- Trypoxylon politum Say, 1837 (pipe organ mud dauber)
- Trypoxylon popondettae Tsuneki, 1981
- Trypoxylon posterorubrum Richards, 1934
- Trypoxylon poultoni Richards, 1934
- Trypoxylon prominens Tsuneki, 1979
- Trypoxylon propinquum Tsuneki, 1980
- Trypoxylon providum F. Smith, 1860
- Trypoxylon pseudoclavicerum Antropov, 1994
- Trypoxylon pulchellum Tsuneki, 1979
- Trypoxylon pullatum Tsuneki, 1979
- Trypoxylon pumilio Arnold, 1959
- Trypoxylon punctatissimum Arnold, 1924
- Trypoxylon punctivertex Richards, 1934
- Trypoxylon punctulatum Taschenberg, 1875
- Trypoxylon punjabense Tsuneki, 1979
- Trypoxylon pusillum Tsuneki, 1979
- Trypoxylon puttalamum Strand, 1922
- Trypoxylon pygmaeum Cameron, 1900
- Trypoxylon quadriceps Tsuneki, 1971
- Trypoxylon rajang Tsuneki, 1980
- Trypoxylon regium Gussakovskij, 1932
- Trypoxylon regulare Viereck, 1906
- Trypoxylon rekabum Tsuneki, 1980
- Trypoxylon richardsi Sandhouse, 1940
- Trypoxylon ridleyi Tsuneki, 1979
- Trypoxylon rogenhoferi Kohl, 1884
- Trypoxylon rohweri Richards, 1934
- Trypoxylon rohweriellum Tsuneki, 1980
- Trypoxylon rubiginosum Gussakovskij, 1936
- Trypoxylon rubrifemoratum Richards, 1934
- Trypoxylon rubrocaudatum Tsuneki, 1979
- Trypoxylon rufidens Cameron, 1905
- Trypoxylon rufigaster Tsuneki, 1979
- Trypoxylon rufimaculatum Antropov, 1987
- Trypoxylon rufimanum Spinola, 1851
- Trypoxylon rufiventre Tsuneki, 1976
- Trypoxylon rugiceps Dalla Torre, 1897
- Trypoxylon rugifrons F. Smith, 1873
- Trypoxylon rutilans Tsuneki, 1980
- Trypoxylon ryukyuense Tsuneki, 1966
- Trypoxylon sacinasium Tsuneki, 1981
- Trypoxylon salti Richards, 1934
- Trypoxylon salween Tsuneki, 1981
- Trypoxylon samarense Tsuneki, 1980
- Trypoxylon sanctum Richards, 1934
- Trypoxylon sandakanum Tsuneki, 1980
- Trypoxylon sapporoense Tsuneki, 1960
- Trypoxylon sarum Tsuneki, 1980
- Trypoxylon saundersi Richards, 1934
- Trypoxylon saussurei Rohwer, 1912
- Trypoxylon sauteri Tsuneki, 1981
- [[Trypoxylon Sayabouryense]] Tsuneki, 1979
- Trypoxylon scaposum Tsuneki, 1980
- Trypoxylon schmidti Richards, 1936
- Trypoxylon schmiedeknechtii Kohl, 1906
- Trypoxylon schnusei Richards, 1934
- Trypoxylon scitulum Tsuneki, 1980
- Trypoxylon scrobiferum Richards, 1934
- Trypoxylon sculleni Sandhouse, 1940
- Trypoxylon scutatum Chevrier, 1867
- Trypoxylon scutiferum Taschenberg, 1875
- Trypoxylon scutifrons de Saussure, 1892
- Trypoxylon sectum Tsuneki, 1980
- Trypoxylon sedlaceki Tsuneki, 1981
- Trypoxylon sedonense Tsuneki, 1979
- Trypoxylon segregatum Richards, 1934
- Trypoxylon selangor Tsuneki, 1979
- Trypoxylon semicompluvium Tsuneki, 1980
- Trypoxylon semiflavum Richards, 1934
- Trypoxylon semongoh Tsuneki, 1980
- Trypoxylon semperi Tsuneki, 1980
- Trypoxylon senegambicum Kohl, 1906
- Trypoxylon sextum Tsuneki, 1979
- Trypoxylon seyrigi Arnold, 1945
- Trypoxylon shakha Tsuneki, 1979
- Trypoxylon shannoni Richards, 1934
- Trypoxylon shanshan Tsuneki, 1981
- Trypoxylon shimoyamai Tsuneki, 1958
- Trypoxylon sibolangitum Tsuneki, 1979
- Trypoxylon sibuyanense Tsuneki, 1980
- Trypoxylon silvestre Richards, 1934
- Trypoxylon silvicola Tsuneki, 1980
- Trypoxylon simile Tsuneki, 1979
- Trypoxylon similichingi T. Li and Q. Li, 2010
- Trypoxylon simpliceincrassatum T. Li and Q. Li, 2007
- Trypoxylon sinaloense Coville, 1982
- Trypoxylon singaporense Tsuneki, 1979
- Trypoxylon singator Tsuneki, 1981
- Trypoxylon sinuosiscute Arnold, 1945
- Trypoxylon sinuosiscutis Arnold, 1945
- Trypoxylon smithi Tsuneki, 1979
- Trypoxylon sogdianum Gussakovskij, 1952
- Trypoxylon solivagum Arnold, 1946
- Trypoxylon solomonense Tsuneki, 1981
- Trypoxylon sonani Tsuneki, 1990
- Trypoxylon spangleri Tsuneki, 1979
- Trypoxylon speciosum Tsuneki, 1979
- Trypoxylon spinosum Cameron, 1889
- Trypoxylon splendidum Antropov, 2011
- Trypoxylon srilankum Tsuneki, 1979
- Trypoxylon staudingeri Richards, 1934
- Trypoxylon stevensoni Arnold, 1924
- Trypoxylon stieglmayri Richards, 1934
- Trypoxylon straatmani Tsuneki, 1981
- Trypoxylon striolatum Tsuneki, 1979
- Trypoxylon stroudi Gribodo, 1884
- Trypoxylon subimpressum F. Smith, 1856
- Trypoxylon succinctum Cresson, 1865
- Trypoxylon sulcatoides Richards, 1934
- Trypoxylon sumatraense Tsuneki, 1979
- Trypoxylon sumbanicola Tsuneki, 1979
- Trypoxylon sumbanum Tsuneki, 1979
- Trypoxylon superbum F. Smith, 1873
- Trypoxylon surinamense Richards, 1934
- Trypoxylon suumi Tsuneki, 1979
- Trypoxylon syriacum Mercet, 1906
- Trypoxylon szechuen Tsuneki, 1981
- Trypoxylon tadaonis Tsuneki, 1980
- Trypoxylon tainanense Strand, 1923
- Trypoxylon taiwanum Tsuneki, 1967
- Trypoxylon takasago Tsuneki, 1966
- Trypoxylon taros Tsuneki, 1980
- Trypoxylon tawitawiense Tsuneki, 1976
- Trypoxylon tekuense Tsuneki, 1979
- Trypoxylon tengmen Tsuneki, 1981
- Trypoxylon tengu Tsuneki, 1981
- Trypoxylon tenoctitlan Richards, 1934
- Trypoxylon terbakarinum Tsuneki, 1979
- Trypoxylon testaceicorne Cameron, 1907
- Trypoxylon testaceipes Arnold, 1924
- Trypoxylon texense de Saussure, 1867
- Trypoxylon thaianum Tsuneki, 1961
- Trypoxylon timberlakei Sandhouse, 1940
- Trypoxylon tirimen Tsuneki, 1980
- Trypoxylon tjangkoedang Tsuneki, 1979
- Trypoxylon tjiangsanum Tsuneki, 1979
- Trypoxylon tobiasi Antropov, 1989
- Trypoxylon toltecum de Saussure, 1867
- Trypoxylon tomi Tsuneki, 1979
- Trypoxylon townesi Tsuneki, 1981
- Trypoxylon townesorum Tsuneki, 1980
- Trypoxylon transversistriatum Strand, 1910
- Trypoxylon tremulum Arnold, 1946
- Trypoxylon triangulum Tsuneki, 1981
- Trypoxylon tridentatum Packard, 1867
- Trypoxylon trigeminum Richards, 1934
- Trypoxylon trinidadense Richards, 1934
- Trypoxylon triodon Richards, 1934
- Trypoxylon triste Arnold, 1924
- Trypoxylon trituberculatum Tsuneki, 1980
- Trypoxylon trochanteratum Cameron, 1902
- Trypoxylon truncatum Tsuneki, 1979
- Trypoxylon tuberculifrons Arnold, 1945
- Trypoxylon turbulentum Arnold, 1946
- Trypoxylon turkestanicum Gussakovskij, 1936
- Trypoxylon undatum Tsuneki, 1979
- Trypoxylon unguicorne Richards, 1934
- Trypoxylon urbanii Tsuneki, 1979
- Trypoxylon urichi Richards, 1934
- Trypoxylon ussuriense Kazenas, 1980
- Trypoxylon vagulum Richards, 1934
- Trypoxylon vagum F. Smith, 1873
- Trypoxylon vardyi Tsuneki, 1979
- Trypoxylon varicolor Tsuneki, 1980
- Trypoxylon varipes Pérez, 1905
- Trypoxylon varipiloides Tsuneki, 1980
- Trypoxylon varipilosum Cameron, 1901
- Trypoxylon varipunctatum Tsuneki, 1980
- Trypoxylon vechti Tsuneki, 1979
- Trypoxylon venaticum Tsuneki, 1980
- Trypoxylon vicinum Tsuneki, 1979
- Trypoxylon viduum Arnold, 1951
- Trypoxylon vientianense Tsuneki, 1979
- Trypoxylon viridaricola Tsuneki, 1979
- Trypoxylon volitans Arnold, 1956
- Trypoxylon wallacei Tsuneki, 1980
- Trypoxylon walshae Tsuneki, 1979
- Trypoxylon warisum Tsuneki, 1981
- Trypoxylon wauense Tsuneki, 1981
- Trypoxylon wegneri Tsuneki, 1980
- Trypoxylon wheeleri Richards, 1936
- Trypoxylon williamsi Tsuneki, 1980
- Trypoxylon winthemi Richards, 1934
- Trypoxylon xanthandrum Richards, 1934
- Trypoxylon xantianum de Saussure, 1867
- Trypoxylon xenophon Richards, 1934
- Trypoxylon yanoi Tsuneki, 1980
- Trypoxylon yebissum Tsuneki, 1979
- Trypoxylon yogator Tsuneki, 1979
- Trypoxylon yoshimotoi Tsuneki, 1981
- Trypoxylon yumi Tsuneki, 1979
- Trypoxylon zikae Arnold, 1956
- Trypoxylon zurki Leclercq, 1965
