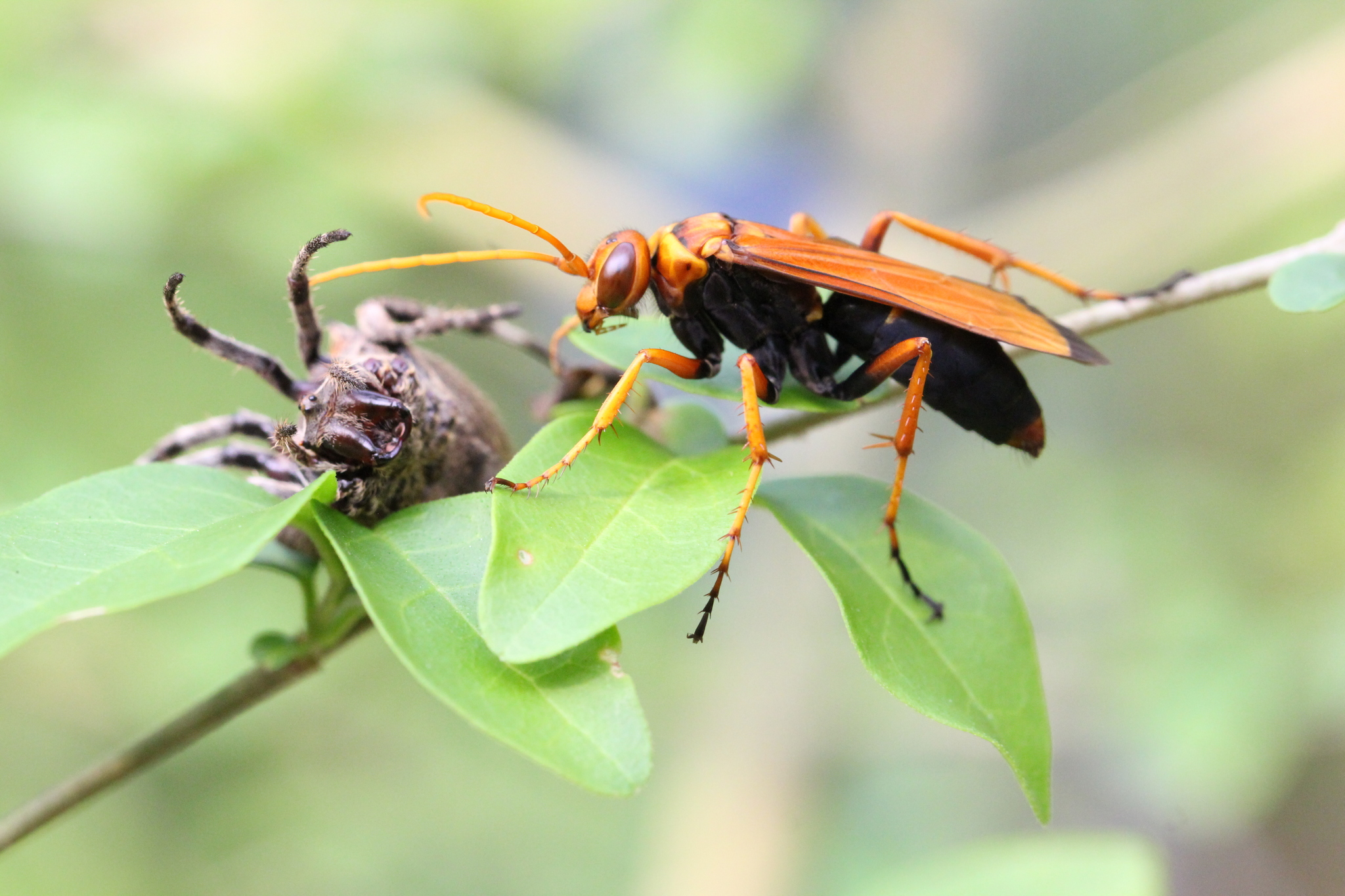
- Batozonellus annulatus

Scientific classification
- Kingdom: Animalia
- Phylum: Arthropoda
- Class: Insecta
- Order: Hymenoptera
- Family: Pompilidae
- Subfamily: Pompilinae
- Genus: Batozonellus; Arnold, 1937

Synonyms
- Heteronyx Saussure, 1887 (preocc. Heteronyx Guérin-Méneville, 1831)

= Batozonellus =

Genus of wasps

Batozonellus is a genus of the spider hunting wasps (insects belonging to the family Pompilidae).

== Description ==
The species of the genus Batozonellus range from large to very large. Body is black and yellow. The compound eyes are large. Clypeus is short and broad. The wings are yellow. The tip of the forewing has a brownish band. The pterostigma is quite small. The tibiae have long spines. The females dig their nests in the ground and supply larvae with spiders of the family Araneidae.

== Species ==
The 10 species in the genus are:

- Batozonellus aliciae (Bingham, 1896)
- Batozonellus annulatus (Fabricius, 1793)
- Batozonellus fuliginosus (Klug, 1834)
- Batozonellus flavithoracicus Li & Li, 2014
- Batozonellus maculifrons (Smith, 1873)
- Batozonellus magadiensis Arnold, 1937
- Batozonellus nigeriensis Arnold, 1937
- Batozonellus occidentalis Arnold, 1937
- Batozonellus tricolor Turner, 1916
- Batozonellus vespoides Turner, 1916

=== Transferred to Parabatozonus ===
The following species formerly placed within the genus Batozonellus have been reclassified under to the genus Parabatozonus:

- Parabatozonus lacerticida (Pallas, 1771)

== Distribution and habitat ==
These wasps colonize predominantly open habitats and forest edges. The genus Batozonellus is found across Europe, Asia, Africa, and Australia.
