= Augustus Daniel Imms =

English educator, research administrator and entomologist

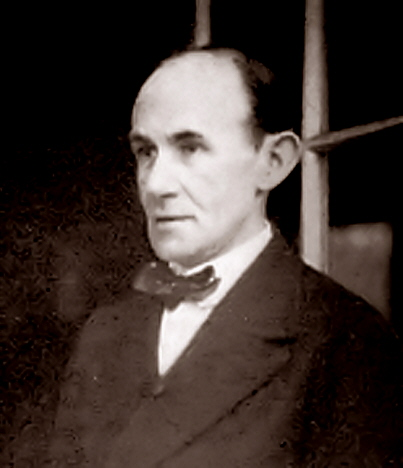
- Born: August 24, 1880; Moseley, Worcestershire, England
- Died: April 3, 1949 (aged 68); Tipton St. John, Devon

Augustus Daniel Imms FRS (24 August 1880 – 3 April 1949) was an English educator, research administrator and entomologist. He wrote several textbooks about entomology with Imms' General Textbook of Entomology last being published in 1977 as a 10th edition.

== Early life ==
Augustus was the elder of two children, his sister dying before him. His father, Walter Imms, worked at Lloyds Bank. His mother, Mary Jane Daniel, was born at Newark, New Jersey, U.S.A., of English parents who returned to England a few years later. He was among the few in his family who took to science.

He suffered from asthma and his private schooling was interrupted frequently. He spent some time at St Edmunds High School, Birmingham, where the headmaster, William Bywater Grove, was a well-known mycologist. His interest in natural history was however encouraged most by C. F. Olney of the Northampton Natural History Society. He bought Robert Bentley Todd's Cyclopædia of Anatomy and Physiology when he was about seventeen years old, and this had George Newport's detailed article on the 'Insecta'.

== Later life ==
Imms studied science at Mason University College, Birmingham, and although his father wished him to become an industrial chemist, he took to biology. He studied under T. W. Bridge, then Professor of Zoology, and produced two scientific papers on fishes in 1904 & 1905. He graduated B.Sc. London with a second-class honours in zoology in 1903. After spending two years under Bridge at Birmingham, he received the 1851 Exhibition Science Scholarship in 1905 which helped him go to Cambridge, where he joined Christ's College under A. E. Shipley. He received his MSc in 1906 from the University of Birmingham. He worked as a student demonstrator and assistant demonstrator in zoology at Birmingham.

In 1911, Imms received an offer from the Government of India to become Forest entomologist at Dehra Dun to succeed E. P. Stebbing. He studied lac cultivation in the Central Provinces and the pests of coniferous forests. He considered the six years in India as a better option that staying on in Cambridge and acquiring a ‘myopic impression that Cambridge is the centre of the universe’. In 1913 he left India for health reasons and accepted a post of Reader in Agricultural Entomology under Professor S. J. Hickson at Manchester. He repeatedly wrote to Rothamsted Experimental Station, urging the authorities to set up an entomology department which they did and in 1918 with him as Chief Entomologist.

The first edition of his A General Textbook of Entomology appeared in 1925, published by Methuen and remained in print until his death. By then it had become the premier entomological textbook, rivaled at that time only by the earlier An Introduction to Entomology by John Henry Comstock. After Imms' death, three more editions were produced by Owain Richards and Richard Gareth Davies, with their final, tenth edition appearing in 1977.

He was a Fellow of the Royal Society and the Royal Entomological Society.

In 1947 he was elected a Member of the American Academy of Arts and Sciences.

== Books ==
- Imms, A.D. (1934). A general textbook of entomology: Including the anatomy, physiology, development and classification of insects. Dutton.
- Imms, A.D. (1937). Recent Advances in Entomology. London: J.A. Churchill Ltd.
- Imms, A.D. (1947). Insect Natural History. London: Collins.

== Journal articles ==
- Imms, A. D. (1907). "On the Larval and Pupal Stages of Anopheles Maculipennis, Meigen". Epidemiology & Infection. 7 (2): 291–318. doi:10.1017/S0022172400033301. ISSN 0022-1724. PMC 2236239. PMID 20474313.
- Imms, A. D. (1908). "On the Larval and Pupal Stages of Anopheles Maculipennis, Meigen". Parasitology. 1 (2): 103–133. doi:10.1017/S0031182000003322. ISSN 1469-8161.
- Imms, A. D. (1910). "The Habits and Distribution of Scutigera in India". Nature. 84 (2136): 429–429. doi:10.1038/084429a0. ISSN 1476-4687.
