= Anthene arnoldi =

Arnold's hairtail

Conservation status
- Least Concern (IUCN 3.1)

Scientific classification
- Kingdom: Animalia
- Phylum: Arthropoda
- Class: Insecta
- Order: Lepidoptera
- Family: Lycaenidae
- Genus: Anthene
- Species: A. arnoldi

Binomial name
- Anthene arnoldi (N. Jones, 1918)

Synonyms
- Lycaenesthes arnoldi N. Jones, 1918; Anthene (Anthene) arnoldi

Species of butterfly

Anthene arnoldi, or Arnold's hairtail, is a butterfly in the family Lycaenidae. The species was first described by Neville Jones in 1918. It is found in Zambia and Zimbabwe. The habitat consists of savanna woodland.

Adults are on wing in summer. Adults are most commonly encountered in September and October.

The species was named after Dr George Arnold.
