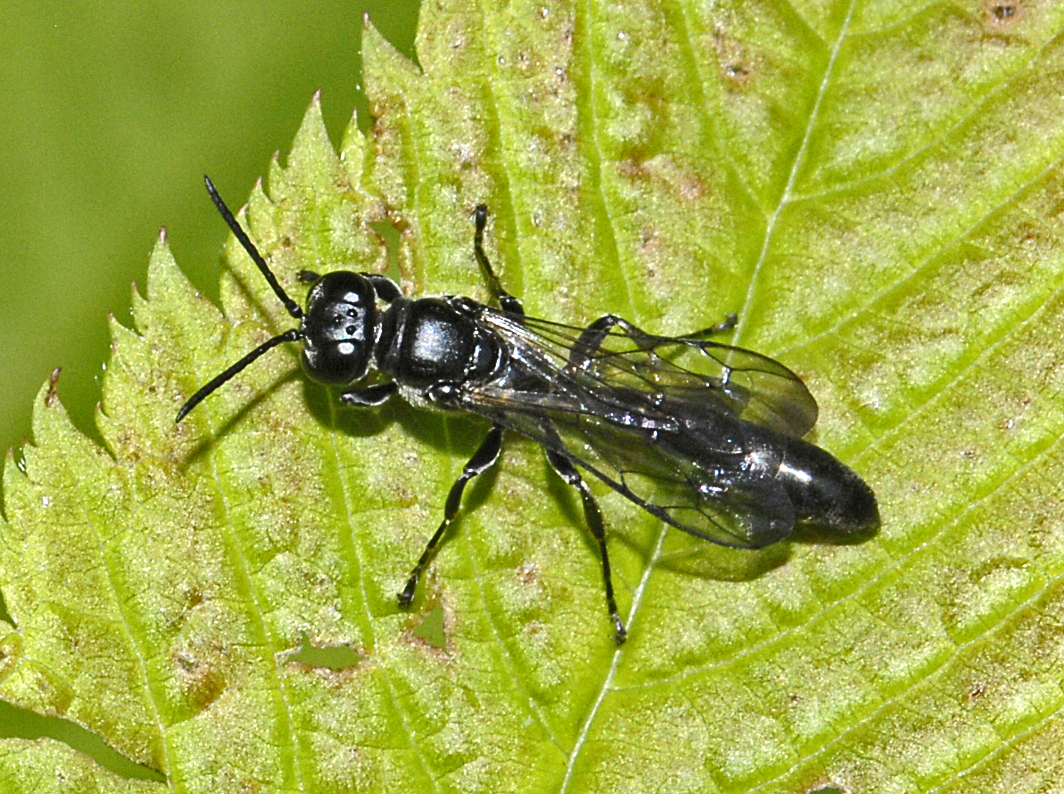
- Trypoxylon species

Scientific classification
- Kingdom: Animalia
- Phylum: Arthropoda
- Clade: Pancrustacea
- Class: Insecta
- Order: Hymenoptera
- Family: Crabronidae
- Subfamily: Crabroninae
- Tribe: Trypoxylini
- Genus: Trypoxylon; Latreille, 1796

= Trypoxylon =

Genus of wasps

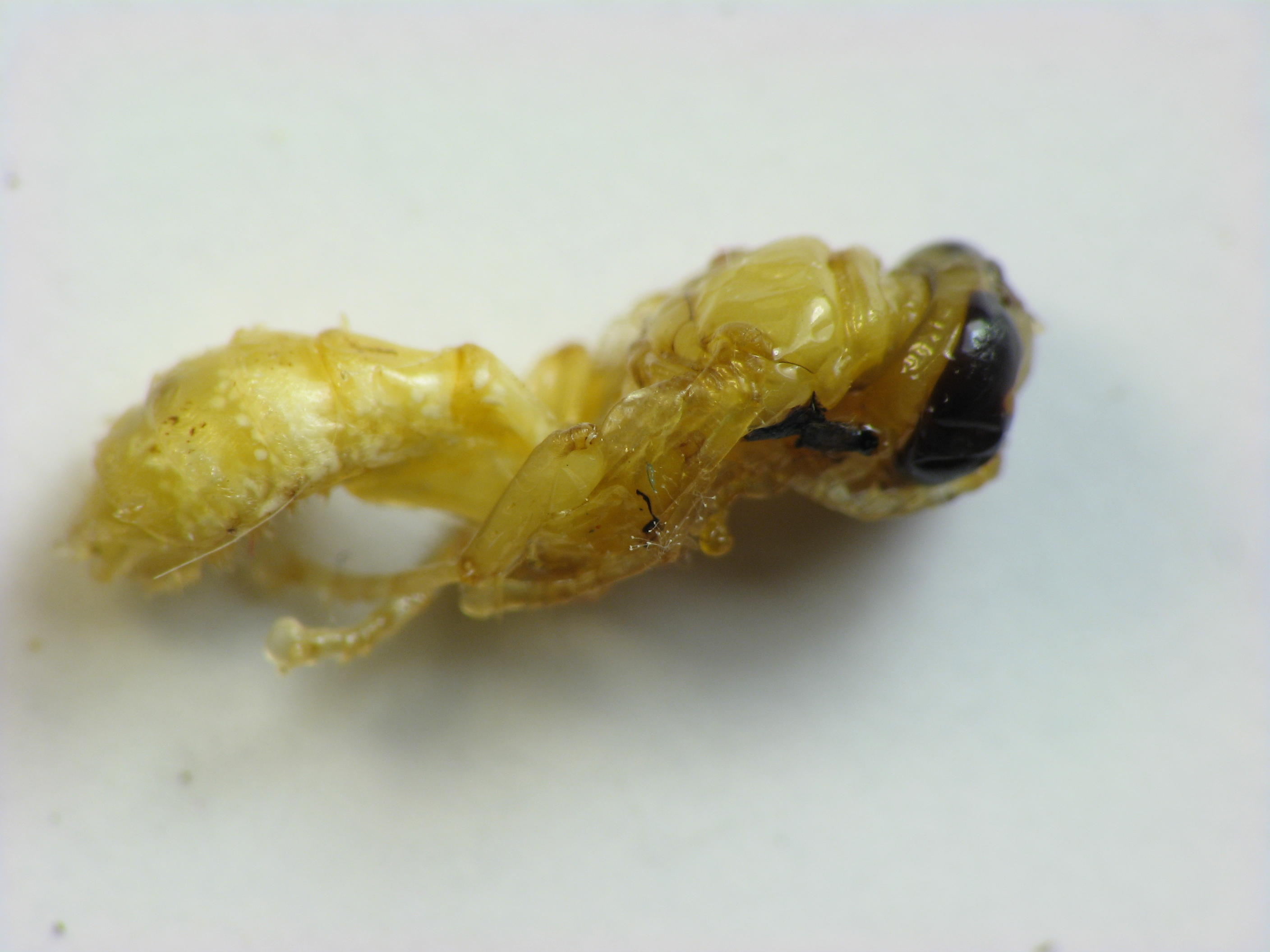
Trypoxylon collinum pupa

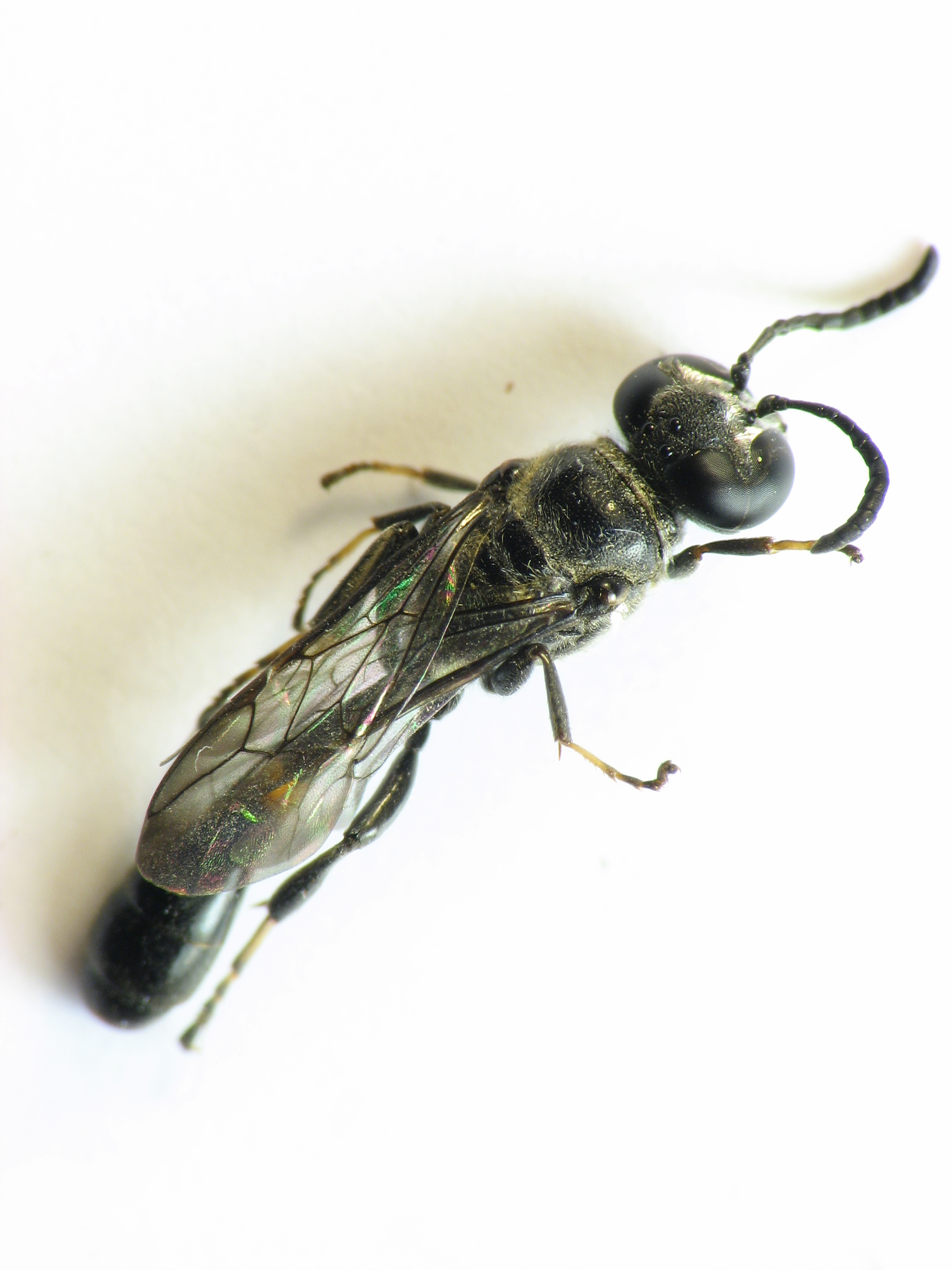
Trypoxylon collinum adult

Trypoxylon is a genus of wasps in the family Crabronidae. All Trypoxylon species that have been studied so far are active hunters of spiders, which they paralyse with a venomous sting, to provide as food to their developing larvae. Depending on the species, they will either construct their own nest from mud or find cavities that already exist. These cavities can range from keyholes to nail holes to previously abandoned nests, and are generally sealed with mud to create cells for their larvae.

== Worldwide distribution ==
The 634 species in this most speciose genus are found worldwide being represented in the Palearctic, Nearctic, Afrotropic (largest number of species in the Old World), Neotropic (highest number of species), Australasia (poorly represented) and Indomalayan realm. There are two subgenera; subgenus Trypoxylon has a worldwide distribution, whereas species in subgenus Trypargilum are endemic to North, Central, and South America.

== Description ==
The genus is characterized by a single submarginal cell in the forewing, and an elongated metasoma (clavate or petiolate). Length varies from 4 to 24 mm. Most Trypoxylon are black, but some species have gasters that are largely red or yellow. As in other Trypoxylini, the inner margin of each eye is strongly notched (emarginate).

Trypoxylon punctivertex illustrating the clavate metasoma

Face of a Trypoxylon wasp, showing the emarginate eyes.

Wings of Trypoxylon indicating the single submarginal cell (S)

== Selected species ==
Main article: List of Trypoxylon species

Below is a list of selected species of Trypoxylon:

- Trypoxylon abditum Arnold, 1924
- Trypoxylon acutangulum Arnold, 1951
- Trypoxylon aegyptum Kohl, 1906
- Trypoxylon albipes F. Smith, 1856
- Trypoxylon attenuatum F. Smith, 1851
- Trypoxylon beaumonti Antropov, 1991
- Trypoxylon calvatum Say, 1837
- Trypoxylon clavicerum Lepeletier & Serville, 1828
- Trypoxylon collinum F. Smith, 1856
- Trypoxylon deceptorium Antropov, 1991
- Trypoxylon figulus (Linnaeus, 1758)
- Trypoxylon frigidum F. Smith, 1856
- Trypoxylon fronticorne Gussakowskij, 1936
- Trypoxylon kolazyi Kohl, 1893
- Trypoxylon kostylevi Antropov, 1985
- Trypoxylon lactitarse Saussure, 1842
- Trypoxylon latilobatum Antropov, 1991
- Trypoxylon medium Beaumont, 1945
- Trypoxylon megriense Antropov, 1985
- Trypoxylon minus Beaumont, 1945
- Trypoxylon politum Drury, 1773
- Trypoxylon rogenhoferi Kohl, 1884
- Trypoxylon rubiginosum Gussakowskij, 1936
- Trypoxylon scutatum Chevrier, 1867
- Trypoxylon syriacum Mercet, 1906

== Bibliography ==
- Bohart, R. M. & Menke, A. S. 1976. Sphecid Wasps of the World: a Generic Revision. — Berkeley: Univ. California Press. — ix. 695 pp.
- Tsuneki, K. 1977. Some Trypoxylon species from the southwestern Pacific (Hymenoptera, Sphecidae, Larrinae). Special Publication, Japan Hymenopterists Association 6: 20 pp.
- Tsuneki, K. 1978. Studies on the genus Trypoxylon Latreille of the Oriental and Australian regions (Hymenoptera, Sphecidae) I. Group of Trypoxylon scutatum Chevrier with some species from Madagascar and the adjacent islands. Special Publication, Japan Hymenopterists Association 7: 87 pp.
- Tsuneki, K. 1979. Studies on the genus Trypoxylon Latreille of the Oriental and Australian regions (Hymenoptera, Sphecidae). III. Species from the Indian subcontinent including southeast Asia. Special Publication, Japan Hymenopterists Association 9: 178 pp.
- Tsuneki, K. 1981. Studies on the genus Trypoxylon Latreille of the Oriental and Australian regions (Hymenoptera Sphecidae) VIII. Species from New Guinea and South Pacific Islands. IX. Species from Australia. Special Publication, Japan Hymenopterists Association 14: 106 pp.
