= Pisonopsis birkmanni =

Scientific classification
- Domain: Eukaryota
- Kingdom: Animalia
- Phylum: Arthropoda
- Class: Insecta
- Order: Hymenoptera
- Family: Crabronidae
- Genus: Pisonopsis
- Species: P. birkmanni

Binomial name
- Pisonopsis birkmanni Rohwer, 1909

Species of wasp

Pisonopsis birkmanni is a species of square-headed wasp in the family Crabronidae. It is found in Central America and North America.
