= Maud Norris =

English entomologist

Maud J. Norris
- Born: 1907; Plymouth, England
- Died: 31 January 1970 (aged 62–63)
- Education: Cheltenham Ladies' College; King's College, London; Imperial College; London University
- Occupation: Entomologist
- Known for: First to describe primer pheromones
- Spouse: Owain Westmacott Richards

Maud J. Norris (1907 – 31 January 1970) was an English entomologist known for her work on insect pheromones and the physiology of insect development and maturation. A significant part of her career was spent on the study of locusts at the Anti-Locust Research Centre. She was the first to describe what are now called primer pheromones.

== Biography ==
Norris was born in Plymouth where her father was a naval officer. She studied at Cheltenham Ladies' College before going to King's College, London, from where she received a first class honours degree in 1928 followed by a Ph.D. from Imperial College and later a D.Sc. from London University in 1964. She married the entomologist O.W. Richards in 1931. From 1932 to 34 she studied the biology of the stored grain moth Ephestia. In 1945 Boris Uvarov was looking for a researcher to work at the Anti-Locust Research Centre that he directed. Norris applied and was recruited. Her research from 1945 was on locusts and much of it was focused on chemical ecology. She examined the role of chemicals in aggregation and locust development and maturation. In 1954 she demonstrated the first primer pheromone in insects. She joined her husband on expeditions in 1937 to British Guyana and to the Matto Gross in 1968.

She was named a Fellow of the Royal Entomological Society from 1933.
