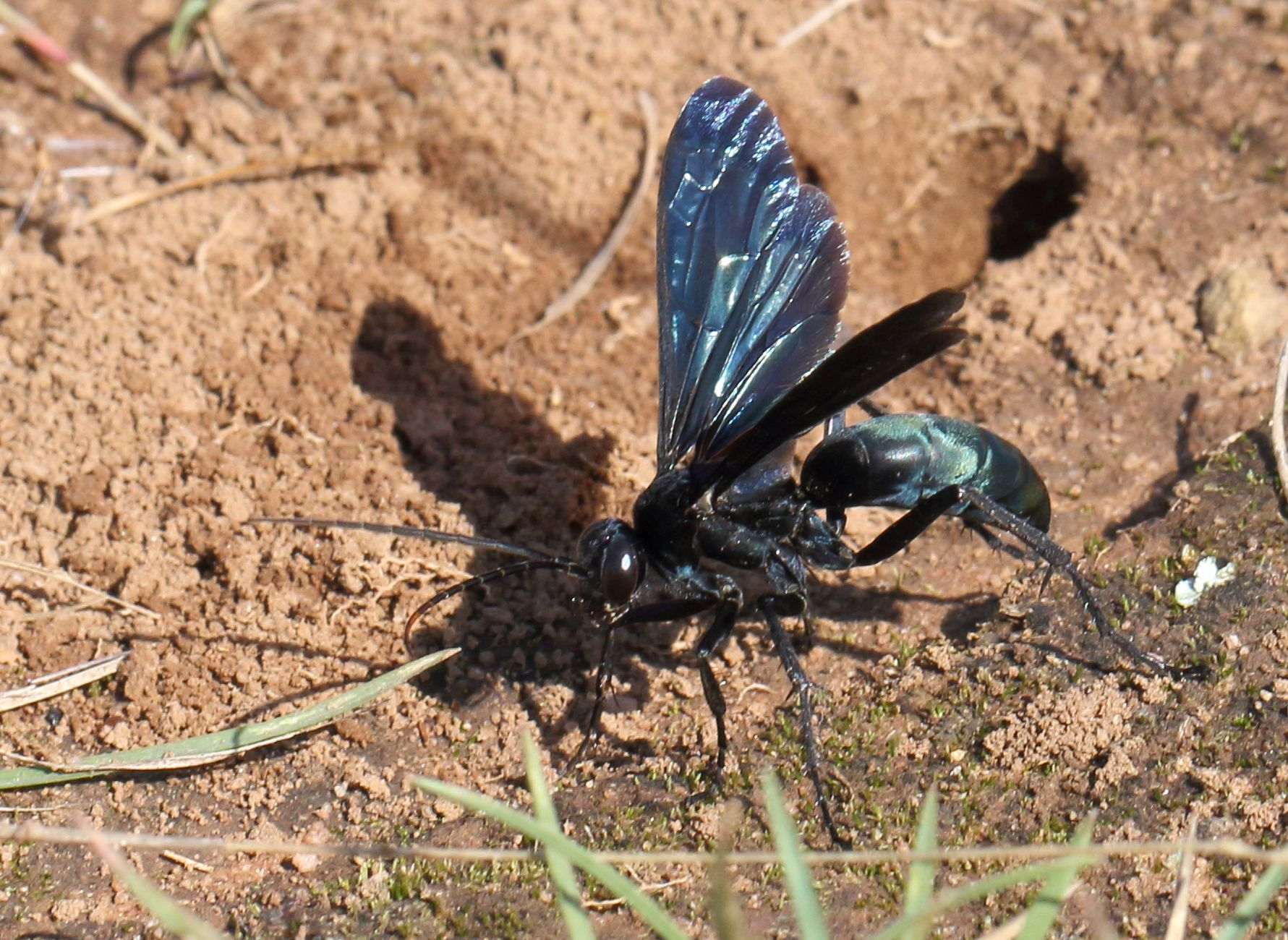
- Female Batozonus fuliginosus

Scientific classification
- Kingdom: Animalia
- Phylum: Arthropoda
- Class: Insecta
- Order: Hymenoptera
- Family: Pompilidae
- Genus: Batozonellus
- Species: B. fuliginosus

Binomial name
- Batozonellus fuliginosus (Klug, 1834)

Synonyms
- Pompilus fuliginosus Klug, 1834

= Batozonellus fuliginosus =

Species of wasp

Batozonellus fuliginosus is an Afrotropical species of spider wasp specialising in capturing orb-web spiders (Araneidae).

== Distribution ==
This spider wasp is recorded from South Africa, through central Africa to Yemen.

== Description ==
These wasps are 11–21 mm in length. Females are largely black (some have yellowish or ferruginous antennae). Males differ in colour, being black and yellow on the head and mesonotum, with yellow, ferruginous and blackish bands on the metenotum.

== Biology ==
Females hunt orb-web spiders (Araneidae), capturing the spider in its web and stings it. The paralysed spider is dragged to the wasp's nest, and an egg is laid on it. When the larva hatches, it consumes the spider, and pupates. Adults feed on nectar from flowers.
