= Richard Gareth Davies =

British entomologist (1920–2007)

Richard Gareth Davies (20 June 1920 – 3 September 2007) was a British entomologist and one-time professor of entomology at Imperial College, at that time a constituent college of the federal University of London. He died on 3 September 2007, at the age of 87.

== Publications ==
In 1925, Augustus Daniel Imms published the first edition of A General Textbook of Entomology. Its seventh edition appeared in 1948, the year before his death. By then it had become one of the standard entomological textbooks of its day; in 1958 it was described as having been "the standard reference work for over 30 years". In 1942, Imms published a shorter, simpler version, Outlines of Entomology. Further editions of both books were published up to the time of Imms' death in 1949, the main textbook reaching the 7th edition, the shorter version the 4th.

After Imms' death, Owain Richards and Davies took on the task of keeping Imms' works up to date. Later editions were published as Imm's General Textbook of Entomology and Imm's Outlines of Entomology, with Richards and Davies given on the cover as the authors. The final 10th edition of the general textbook appeared in 1977. It still is sufficiently significant to have been reprinted (in two softcover volumes).

Davies' other publications include:

- Computer Programming in Quantitative Biology 1971. Published by Academic Press. ISBN 978-0122062506
