= Pisonopsis =

Scientific classification
- Domain: Eukaryota
- Kingdom: Animalia
- Phylum: Arthropoda
- Class: Insecta
- Order: Hymenoptera
- Family: Crabronidae
- Tribe: Trypoxylini
- Genus: Pisonopsis; W. Fox, 1893

Genus of wasps

Pisonopsis is a genus of square-headed wasps in the family Crabronidae. There are about five described species in Pisonopsis.

== Species ==
These five species belong to the genus Pisonopsis:

- Pisonopsis areolata (Spinola, 1851)^{i c g}
- Pisonopsis australis Fritz, 1965^{i c g}
- Pisonopsis birkmanni Rohwer, 1909^{i c g b}
- Pisonopsis clypeata W. Fox, 1893^{i c g}
- Pisonopsis triangularis Ashmead, 1899^{i c g}

Data sources: i = ITIS, c = Catalogue of Life, g = GBIF, b = Bugguide.net
