= Trypoxylon lactitarse =

Scientific classification
- Domain: Eukaryota
- Kingdom: Animalia
- Phylum: Arthropoda
- Class: Insecta
- Order: Hymenoptera
- Family: Crabronidae
- Tribe: Trypoxylini
- Genus: Trypoxylon
- Species: T. lactitarse

Binomial name
- Trypoxylon lactitarse de Saussure, 1867

Synonyms
- Trypoxylon albopilosum W. Fox, 1891; Trypoxylon albopilosum planoense Rohwer, 1909; Trypoxylon cinereum Cameron, 1889; Trypoxylon striatum Provancher, 1888

Species of wasp

Trypoxylon lactitarse is a species of square-headed wasp in the family Crabronidae. It is found in North, Central, and South America, and said to range from Canada to Argentina. These are fairly common harmless solitary wasps, although as with others of this same genus, the adult males can be observed to guard the nests. This species is well-characterised as nesting in pre-existing cavities which has facilitated ecological studies, as females can be easily attracted to nest in human-made trap-nests. Females construct a linear series of cells that are subdivided by mud partitions. In the south of range, nesting activity has been recorded to occur throughout the year, although may be more common in certain months. They can begin construction of their nests with a layer of mud (at the bottom of the first provisioned cell), followed by the formation of a linear series of 6-8 cells.

Nests are provisioned with spiders captured and paralysed by the female wasp, which lays an egg within each elongate brood cell on one of several incapacitated spiders, which each larva will then consume as food within its own sealed brood cell. This species may undergo three or four larval moults as with a similar species Trypoxylon rogenhoferi, until completing their development as pupae inside a black cocoon. Unlike some other cavity nesting wasps, no significant difference was found in the sex of the larvae relative to their brood-cell position.
