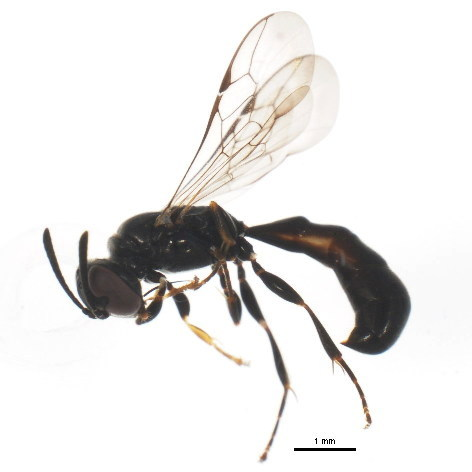

Scientific classification
- Domain: Eukaryota
- Kingdom: Animalia
- Phylum: Arthropoda
- Class: Insecta
- Order: Hymenoptera
- Family: Crabronidae
- Subfamily: Crabroninae
- Tribe: Trypoxylini
- Genus: Trypoxylon
- Species: T. clavicerum

Binomial name
- Trypoxylon clavicerum Lepeletier & Serville, 1828

= Trypoxylon clavicerum =

Species of wasp

Trypoxylon clavicerum is a Palearctic species of solitary wasp.
