= Owain Richards =

British entomologist and ecologist

Owain Westmacott Richards FRS (31 December 1901 – 10 November 1984) was a British entomologist and ecologist who worked as Professor of Zoology and Applied Entomology, Imperial College, London, based at Silwood Park, and an editor of the Journal of Animal Ecology.

Richards was born in Croydon, the second son of the town medical officer Harold Meredith and Mary Cecilia née Todd. His mother was interested in botany and natural history. He studied at St Cross School, Surrey and then as a boarder to Hereford Cathedral School and Brasenose College, Oxford studying mathematics before switching to zoology. He was a Senior Hulme Scholar and a Christopher Welch Scholar. He began to take an interest in British insects, collecting along with H. A. Hamm. His expertise in entomology was appreciated by teachers like Charles Elton. He worked as a research assistant at the Imperial College in the entomology department in 1927. He became a reader in 1937. It was here that he met Maud Norris, his future wife. He became head of the department of zoology at Imperial College in 1953 and also served as a director of the College Field Station in Silwood Park. He was elected to the Royal Society in 1959. He travelled on collection trips to Guyana with his younger brother Paul W. Richards. He retired in 1967. He also travelled to Brazil and Africa, making collections and studying collections in the US and Australia. In 1978 he published The Social Wasps of the Americas. He also contributed to the field of quantitative life budgets and population estimation.

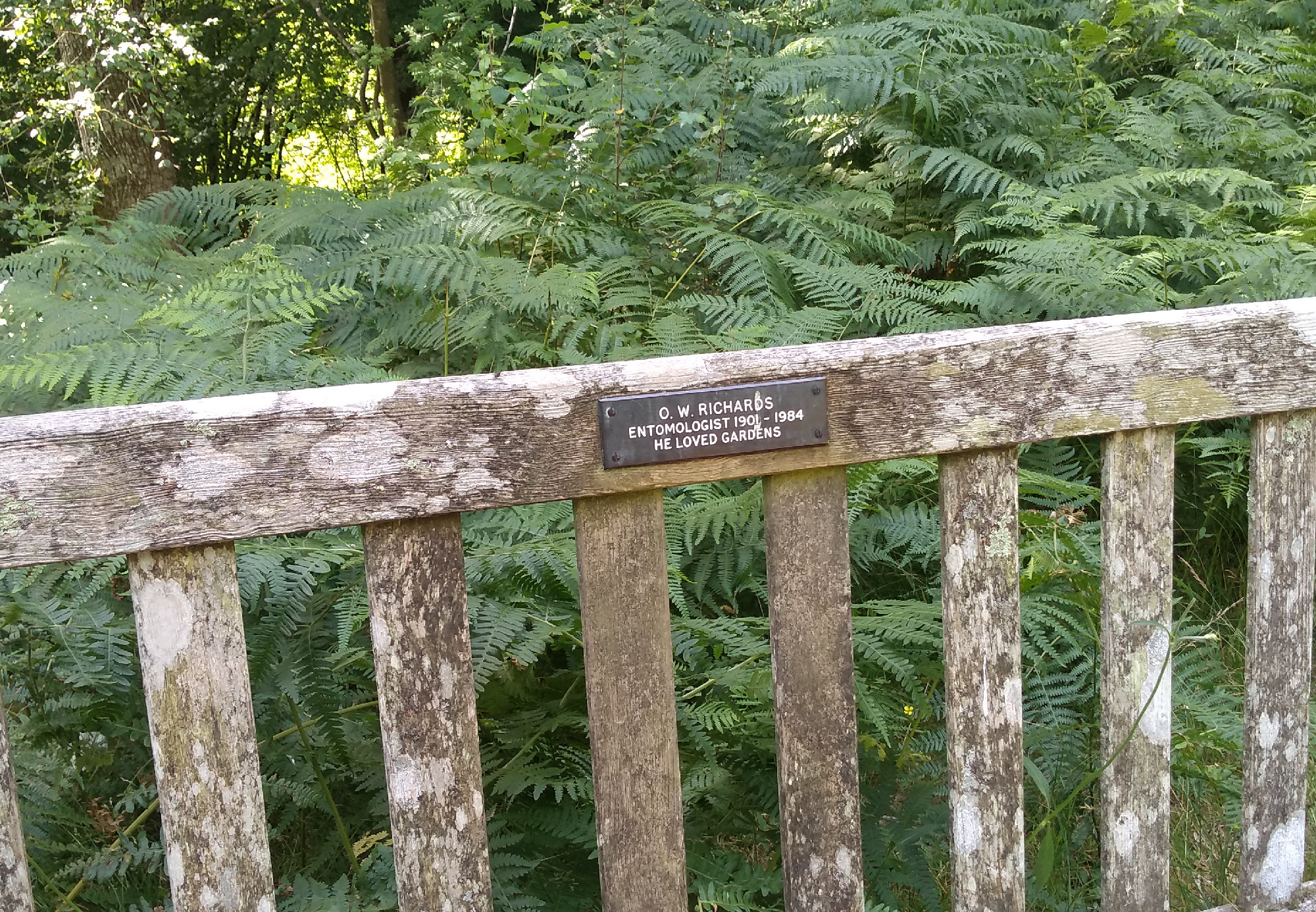
Memorial bench, Wakehurst Place

Among his key activities were revisions made along with Richard Gareth Davies to the Textbook of Entomology by Augustus Daniel Imms. He married the entomologist Maud J. Norris in 1931. Richard's mother was devoutly Anglican while his father was Welsh Baptist but as a child he did not attend church and in later life was an agnostic. His collection of insects which included 69000 Hymenoptera and 14000 diptera were donated to the museum.
