= Trypoxylon frigidum =

Scientific classification
- Domain: Eukaryota
- Kingdom: Animalia
- Phylum: Arthropoda
- Class: Insecta
- Order: Hymenoptera
- Family: Crabronidae
- Genus: Trypoxylon
- Species: T. frigidum

Binomial name
- Trypoxylon frigidum F. Smith, 1856

Synonyms
- Trypargilum aldrichi Rohwer, 1920; Trypoxylon aldrichi Sandhouse, 1940; Trypoxylon plesium (Sandhouse, 1940)

Species of wasp

Trypoxylon frigidum is a species of square-headed wasp in the family Crabronidae. It is found in North America.

== Subspecies ==
These two subspecies belong to the species Trypoxylon frigidum:

- Trypoxylon frigidum cornutum Gussakovskij, 1932
- Trypoxylon frigidum frigidum Gussakovskij, 1932
