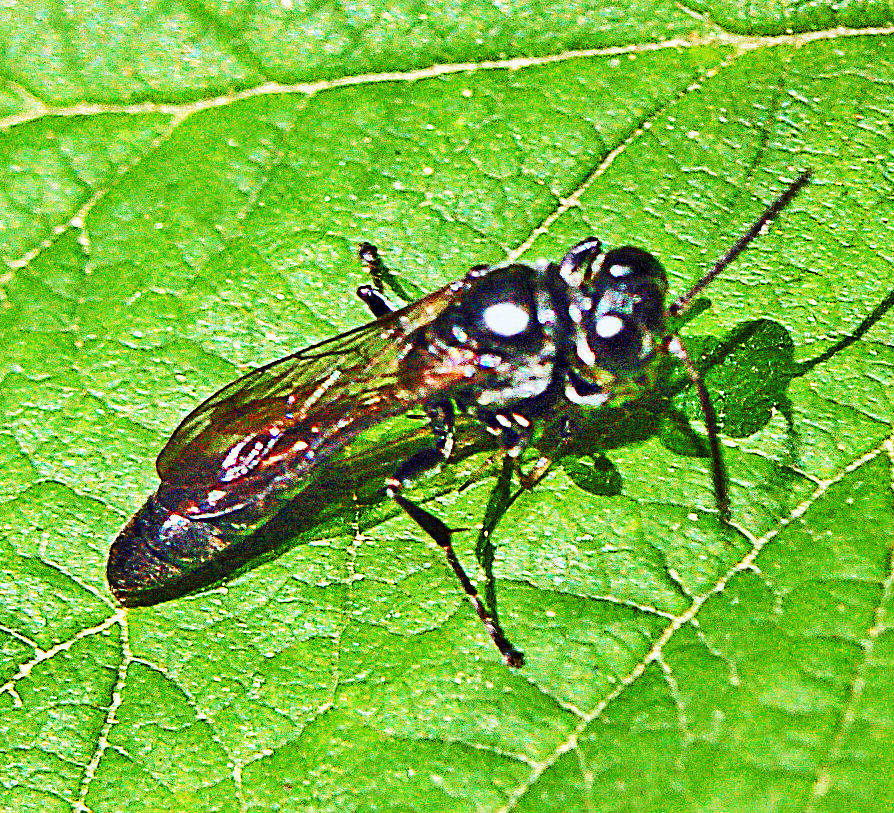

Scientific classification
- Domain: Eukaryota
- Kingdom: Animalia
- Phylum: Arthropoda
- Class: Insecta
- Order: Hymenoptera
- Family: Crabronidae
- Genus: Trypoxylon
- Species: T. scutatum

Binomial name
- Trypoxylon scutatum Chevrier, 1867

= Trypoxylon scutatum =

Species of wasp

Trypoxylon scutatum is a predatory wasp in the family Crabronidae.

== Distribution ==
This species is present in Europe.

== Description ==
Trypoxylon scutatum can reach a length of about 10 millimetres (0.39 in), with a head reaching a width of about 15 millimetres (0.59 in). These quite large wasps have a shiny black body, with large eyes. The hull that borders the frontal shield passes between the posterior ocelli and the anterior ocellum. It shows a strongly obtuse ventral angle, and a small enclosed space. The first gastral segment is rather short, especially in males.
