= Edward Percy Stebbing =

English forester and forest entomologist (1872–1960)

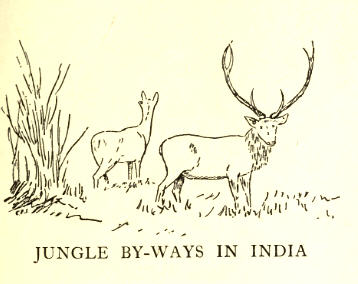
Cover of 1911 book

Edward Percy Stebbing FRSE FRGS FZS (4 January 1870 – 21 March 1960) was a pioneering English forester and forest entomologist in India. He was among the first to warn of desertification and desiccation and wrote on "The encroaching Sahara".

In 1935, he wrote of the "desert whose power is incalculable and whose silent and almost invisible approach must be difficult to estimate." He suggested that this was man-made and this led to a joint Anglo-French forestry mission from December 1936 to February 1937 that toured northern Nigeria and Niger to assess the danger of desertification.

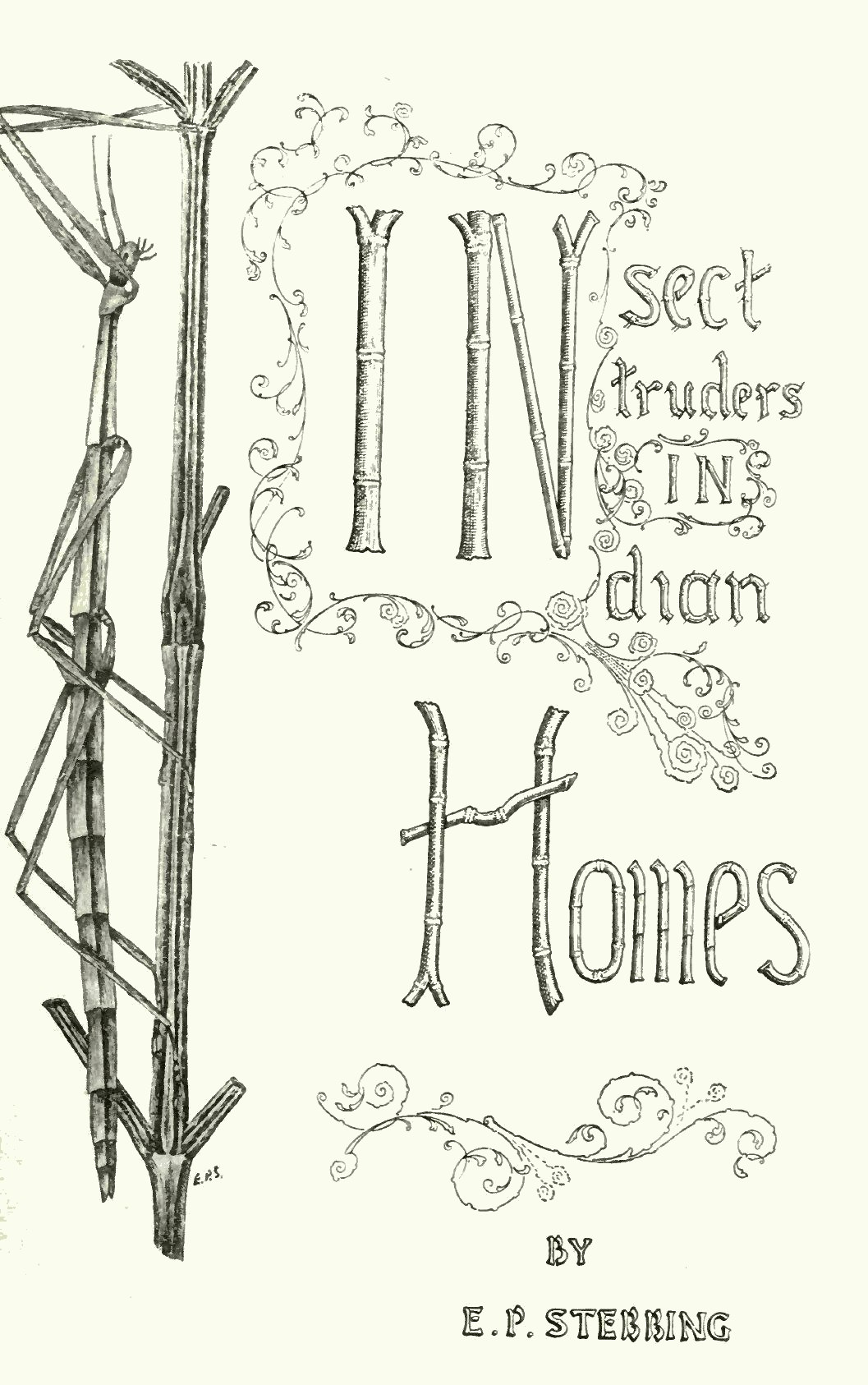
Book cover drawn by Stebbing

== Life ==
He was born in London on 4 January 1872, and was the second son of Edward Charles Stebbing (b. 1839). He was educated at St Paul's School, London. He then studied at the Royal Engineering College and Coopers Hill College (which specialised in training for the Indian Forest Service). He then studied at the University of Edinburgh and graduated with a MA.

From 1900 to 1910, he worked as Forest Entomologist and Zoologist for the Indian Forest Service.

In 1910, he returned to the University of Edinburgh as Professor of Forestry. He lived at 13 Wolseley Place, Edinburgh with his brother.

In the First World War, he was a Second Lieutenant in the Royal Flying Corps. He served on the Serbian Front in Macedonia, taking part in the Battle of Kajmakčalan and acting as transport officer to the Scottish Women's Hospitals.

In 1923, he was elected a Fellow of the Royal Society of Edinburgh. His proposers were Sir Edmund Taylor Whittaker, Ralph Allan Sampson, Arthur Crichton Mitchell and James Hartley Ashworth.

He retired in 1951 and died on 21 March 1960 in Canterbury, Kent

== Family ==
In 1907, he married Maude Evelyn Brown (d. 1950).

== Works ==
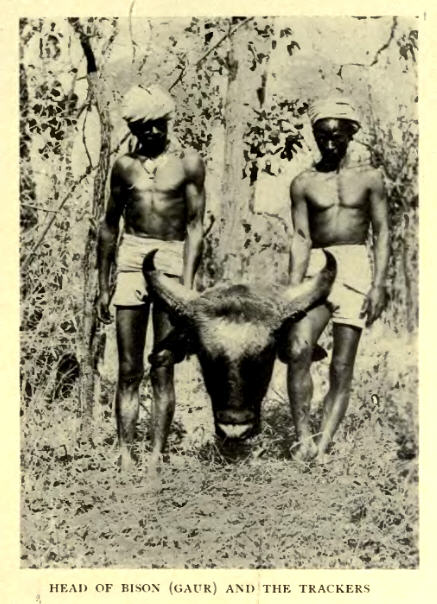
A hunting trophy

- Injurious Insects of Indian Forests (1899) online
- Insect intruders in Indian homes (1909) online
- Stalks in the Himalayas (1911) (New York Times review
- Jungle By-ways in India (1911) online
- Indian forest insects of economic importance. Coleoptera (1914) online
- British Forestry (1916) online
- At the Serbian front in Macedonia (1917) online
- From Czar to Bolshevik (1918) online
- The Diary of a Sportsman Naturalist in India (1920)
- The Forests of India (3 +1 volumes) (1922–26, 1962) ( 4th Volume edited by H. Champion and F. C. Osmaston)
- The forests of West Africa and the Sahara: a Study of Modern Conditions (London and Edinburgh, 1937)
