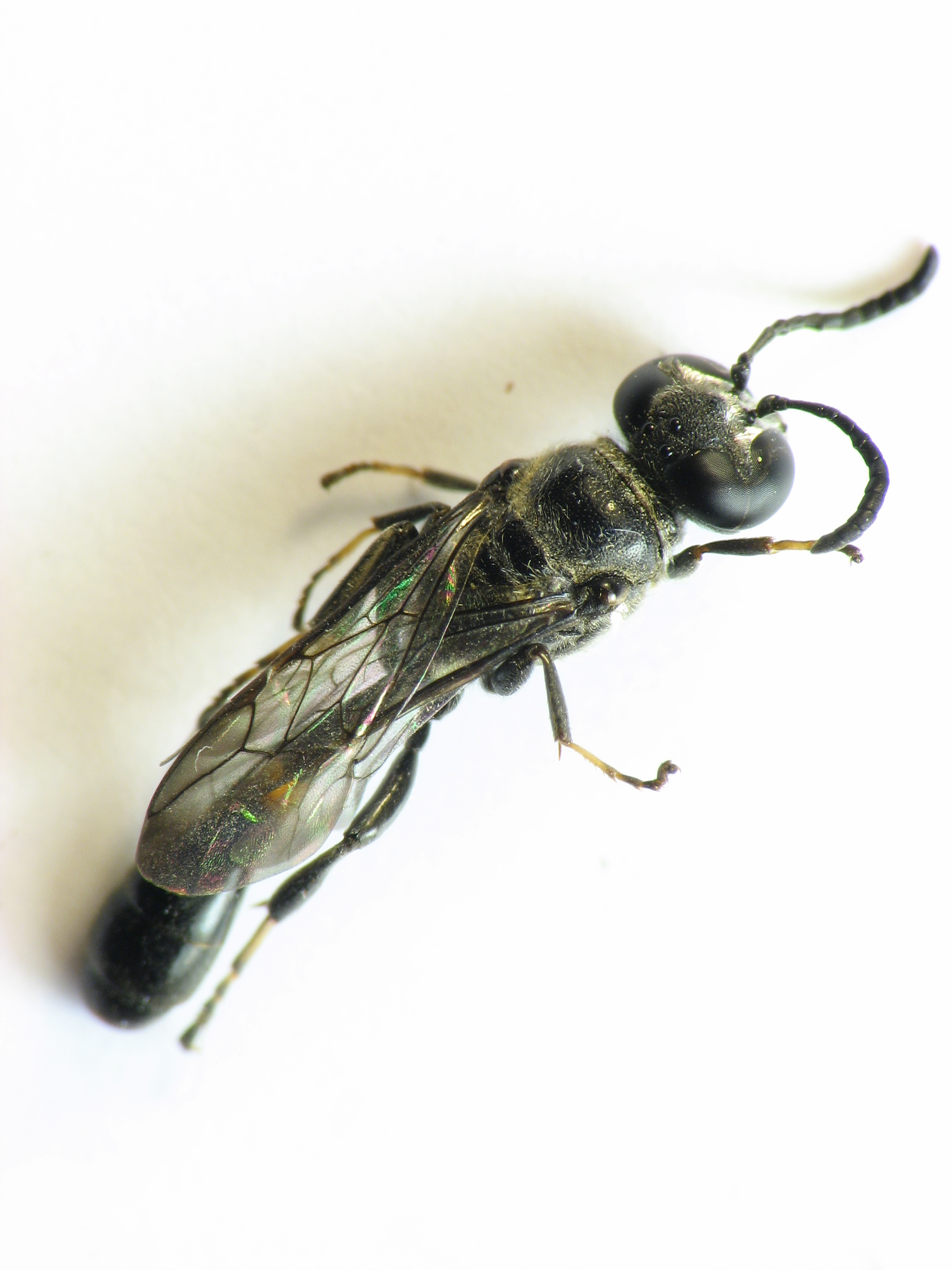
- Trypoxylon collinum

Scientific classification
- Kingdom: Animalia
- Phylum: Arthropoda
- Class: Insecta
- Order: Hymenoptera
- Family: Crabronidae
- Subfamily: Crabroninae
- Tribe: Trypoxylini

= Trypoxylini =

Tribe of insects

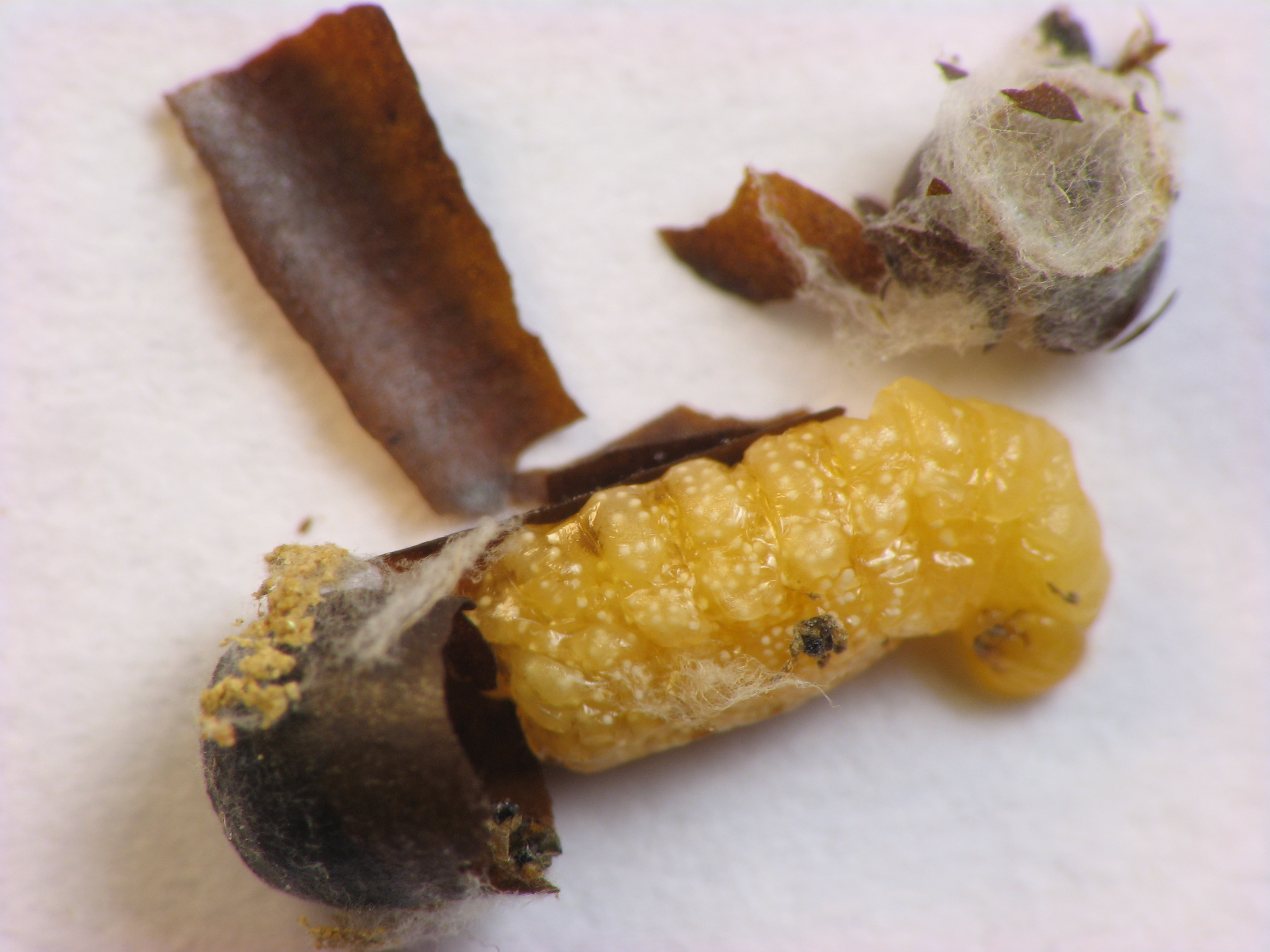
Trypoxylon collinum larva

Trypoxylini is a tribe of traditional Sphecidae in the family Crabronidae. There are at least 840 described species in Trypoxylini.

== Genera ==
These nine genera belong to the tribe Trypoxylini:

- Aulacophilinus Lomholdt, 1980
- Aulacophilus F. Smith, 1869
- Entomopison Menke, 1968
- Pison Jurine in Spinola, 1808
- Pisonopsis W. Fox, 1893
- Pisoxylon Menke, 1968
- Trypoxylon Latreille, 1796
- † Eopison Nel, 2005
- † Megapison Zhang, 1989
