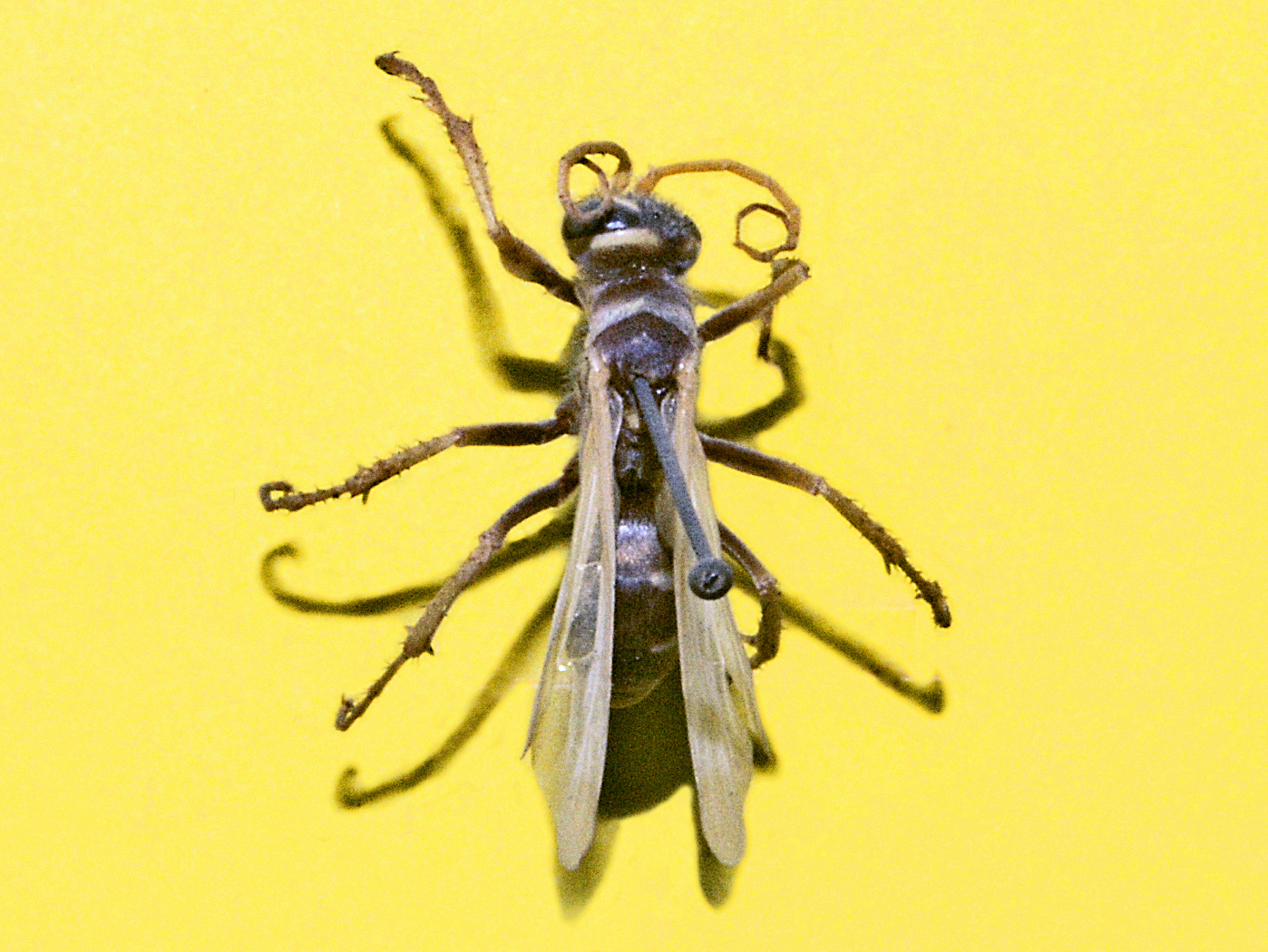
- Parabatozonus lacerticida. Museum specimen

Scientific classification
- Kingdom: Animalia
- Phylum: Arthropoda
- Class: Insecta
- Order: Hymenoptera
- Family: Pompilidae
- Genus: Parabatozonus
- Species: P. lacerticida

Binomial name
- Parabatozonus lacerticida (Pallas, 1771)

Synonyms
- Sphex lacerticida Pallas, 1771; Sphex quadripunctata Fabricius, 1787; Pepsis quadripunctatus (Fabricius, 1787); Pompilus quadripunctatus (Fabricius, 1787); Batozonus quadripunctatus (Fabricius, 1787); Batozonus lacerticida (Pallas, 1771); Batozonellus lacerticida (Pallas, 1771)

= Parabatozonus lacerticida =

Species of wasp

Parabatozonus lacerticida is a species of the spider-hunting wasp of the family Pompilidae.

== Description ==
Parabatozonus lacerticida can reach a length of 16–22 millimetres (0.63–0.87 in) in females and 12.5–17 millimetres (0.49–0.67 in) in males. These spider hunting wasps have a mainly black body with orange antennae, orange legs beginning at the apex of the femora, and yellow markings on the orbits, edge of the pronotum, scutum, scutellum, and terga 2-4 of the abdomen. The wings are orange, with a brownish band on the tips of the forewings.

== Biology ==
This species hunts large orb weaver spiders (family Araneidae) in the genera Argiope and Araneus. Like other spider wasps, they paralyze these spiders with their venomous stings and drag them into their underground nests. Then they lay an egg into the abdomen of their prey.

== Distribution ==
This species has a transpalearctic distribution and can be found across Europe as far west as Portugal, North Africa, and Asia as far east as Japan.
