= Peter Cameron (entomologist) =

English amateur entomologist (1847–1912)

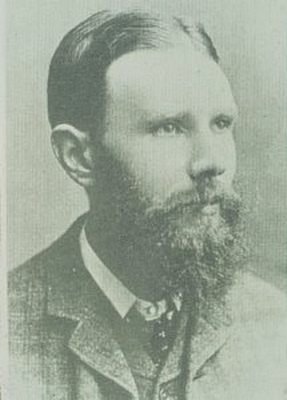

Peter Cameron (1847 – 1 December 1912 in New Mills, Derbyshire) was an English amateur entomologist who specialised in Hymenoptera.

An artist, Cameron worked in the dye industry and in calico printing. He described many new species; his collection, including type material, is now in the Natural History Museum. He suffered from poor health and lack of employment. Late in his life, he lived in New Mills and was supported by scholarships from the Royal Society.

He loaned specimens to Jean-Jacques Kieffer, a teacher and Catholic priest in Bitche, Lorraine, who also named species after Cameron.

Some of Cameron's taxonomic work is not very well regarded. Upon his death Claude Morley wrote, "Peter Cameron is dead, as was announced by most of the halfpenny papers on December 4th. What can we say of his life? Nothing; for it concerns us in no way. What shall we say of his work? Much, for it is entirely ours, and will go down to posterity as probably the most prolific and chaotic output of any individual for many years past." Similarly, American entomologist Richard M. Bohart "wound up with the thankless task of sorting through Cameron's North American contributions to a small group of wasps known as the Odynerini. Of the hundred or so names Cameron proposed within the group, almost all, Bohart found, were invalid."

The Panamanian oak gall wasp Callirhytis cameroni, described in 2014, is named in his honor.

== Works ==
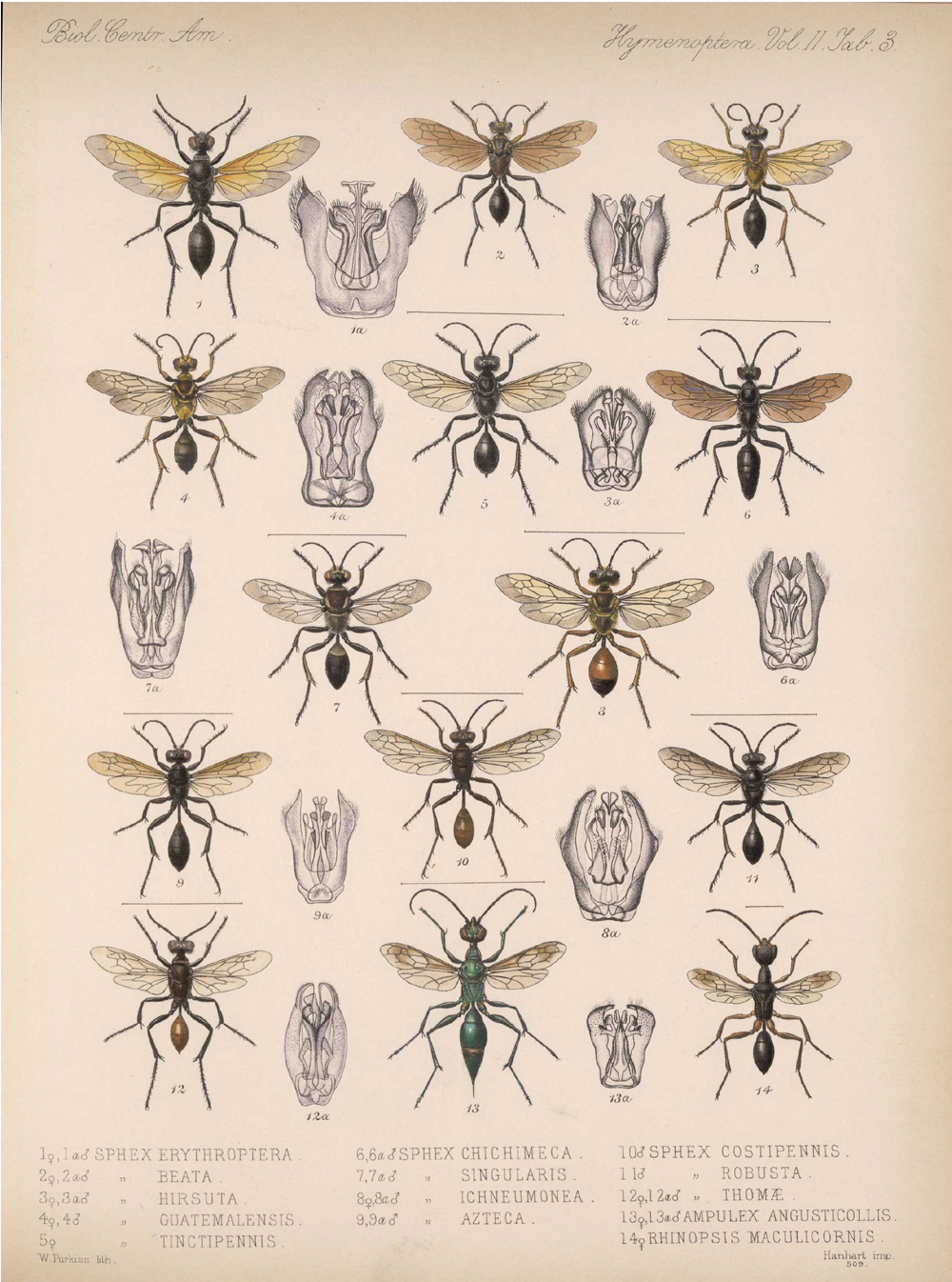
Centrali-Americana Insecta Hymenoptera (Fossores) Vol II (1888–1900)

- A Monograph of the British Phytophagous Hymenoptera Ray Society (1882–1893)
- Hymenoptera volumes of the Biologia Centrali-Americana, volumes 1–2 (1883–1900) and (1888–1900)

A complete list is given in external links below.
