= Trypoxylon clavatum =

Scientific classification
- Domain: Eukaryota
- Kingdom: Animalia
- Phylum: Arthropoda
- Class: Insecta
- Order: Hymenoptera
- Family: Crabronidae
- Genus: Trypoxylon
- Species: T. clavatum

Binomial name
- Trypoxylon clavatum Say, 1837

Synonyms
- Trypoxylon annulare Dahlbom, 1844; Trypoxylon clavatum cockerellae Rohwer, 1909; Trypoxylon cockerellae Rohwer, 1909; Trypoxylon quintile Viereck, 1906; Trypoxylon rufozonale W. Fox, 1891

Species of wasp

Trypoxylon clavatum is a species of square-headed wasp in the family Crabronidae. It is found in North America.

== Subspecies ==
These two subspecies belong to the species Trypoxylon clavatum:

- Trypoxylon clavatum clavatum Say, 1837
- Trypoxylon clavatum johannis Richards, 1934
