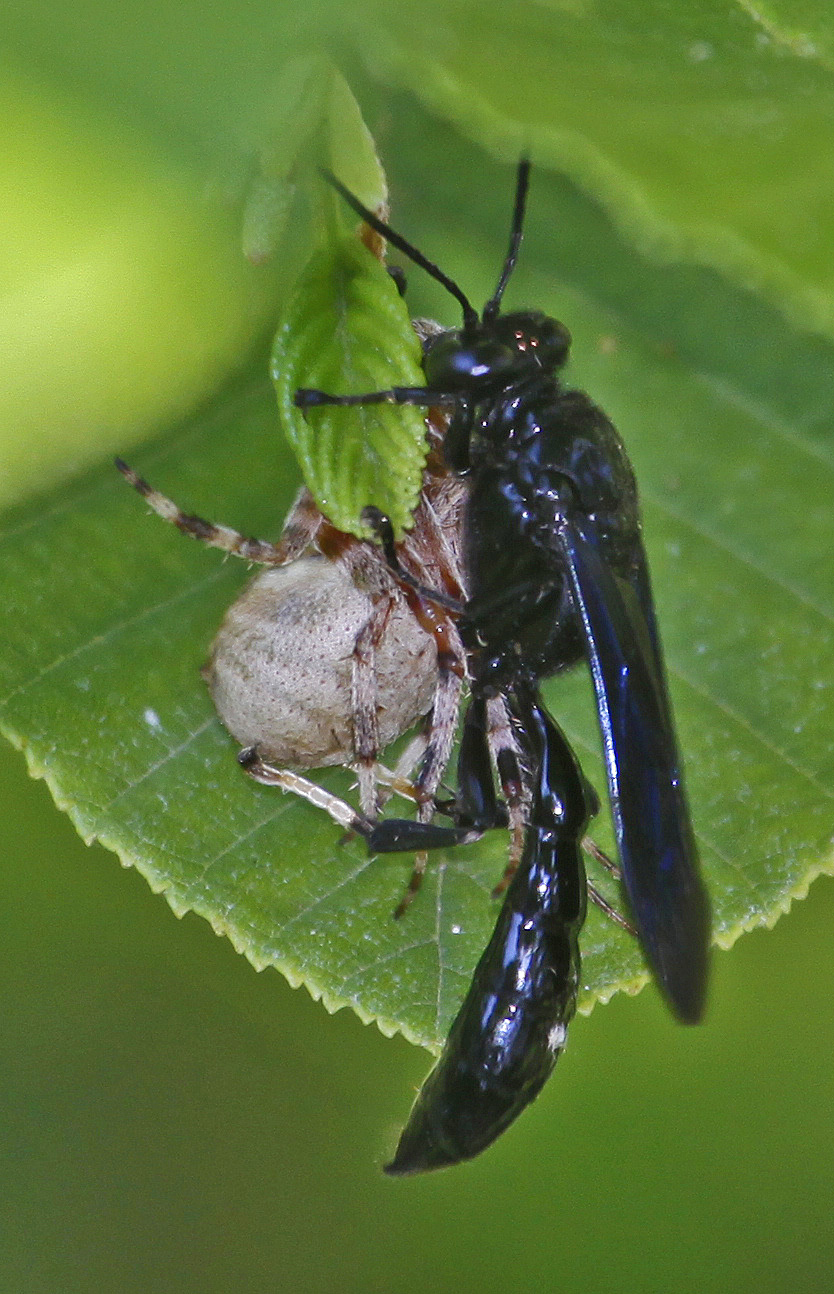
- Organ pipe mud dauber with a spider, Woodbridge, Virginia

Scientific classification
- Kingdom: Animalia
- Phylum: Arthropoda
- Clade: Pancrustacea
- Class: Insecta
- Order: Hymenoptera
- Family: Crabronidae
- Genus: Trypoxylon
- Species: T. politum

Binomial name
- Trypoxylon politum Drury, 1773

= Organ pipe mud dauber =

Species of wasp

The organ pipe mud dauber (Trypoxylon politum) is a predatory wasp in the family Crabronidae. It is fairly large, ranging from 3.9 to 5.1 cm, and has been recorded to fly from May to September. Females and males are similar in colour, a shiny black, with the end part of the back leg being pale yellow to white.

The organ pipe mud dauber gets its name from the distinctive shape and composition of its nests. It is native to eastern North America.

Organ pipe mud daubers are also an exceedingly docile species of wasp, and generally beneficial to have around, as they serve to keep spider populations down; larvae feed on living paralyzed spiders.

== Distribution and habitat ==
The organ pipe mud dauber ranges from Southeastern Canada to the Eastern United States They use tree holes or the underside of bridges to construct their nests out of mud. Nest site choice usually depends on three specifications - a smooth, vertical surface with ample shade and rainfall protection, a source of mud nearby, and an adjacent forest. The females form long mud tubes consisting of multiple cells, which they fortify with paralyzed spiders. The female then lays an egg in each cell and leaves the nest; once the eggs hatch, the larvae feed on the spiders. The larvae then pupate until they become adults. A female can either build a new nest, use an abandoned one, challenge another female making one to claim it as her own, or (on rare occasions) enter a freshly constructed one and remove the egg to replace it with her own. The female typically constructs five or six pipes in a cluster, either side-by-side or on top of each other. When pipes are added in layers, the survivability of the freshly hatched adults decreases, as they must chew their way out of a pipe to emerge. The more pipes clustered on top of one another, the less successful the new organ pipe mud daubers are going to be to chew their way out alive. A newly hatched adult female usually begins building her new nest within 48 hours of leaving her birth nest.

== Life history ==
In the southern populations, T. politum has a partially bivoltine life-history pattern: Some wasps in these populations have offspring that emerge after winter, before the end of June. Other offspring in this geographical range overwinter and reproduce after winter. North of central Virginia, the wasps have a univoltine life-history pattern, and only produce one generation per year.

== Behaviour ==
Mud daubers of this species are unique, compared to many other wasps, in that males stay at the mouth of the nest to protect the offspring. The male guards the young from intruders, parasites, and other males. This energy investment, to increase the likelihood in the survivability of their offspring, is known as parental care. The male may also help the female in nest construction. Like other wasps, T. politum is haplodiploid. The unfertilized eggs generate males and fertilized eggs become females. Adult mothers feed the fertilized (female) eggs more than the unfertilized eggs. Because of this additional food allotment, females tend to be the larger of the two sexes. This uneven division of resources is called sex allocation. Females showed a positive correlation between body size and increased fecundity, which offers an explanation as to why the bias for increased female food provision and body size exists.

Organ pipe mud daubers feed mainly on three genera of spider: Neoscona, Araneus, and Eustala.

== Parasites ==
Melittobia, a parasitoid wasp, is a common ectoparasite of T. politum prepupae. Other sources of parasitism include the bombyliid fly Anthrax, chrysidid wasps, and various species of scavenger flies (Miltogramminae). The tufted titmouse (Parus bicolor) is a known predator of T. politum, and may feed on them more commonly than previously thought, as the holes made by the titmouse are similar in shape and size to those made by T. politum leaving the nest after pupation.

== Gallery ==
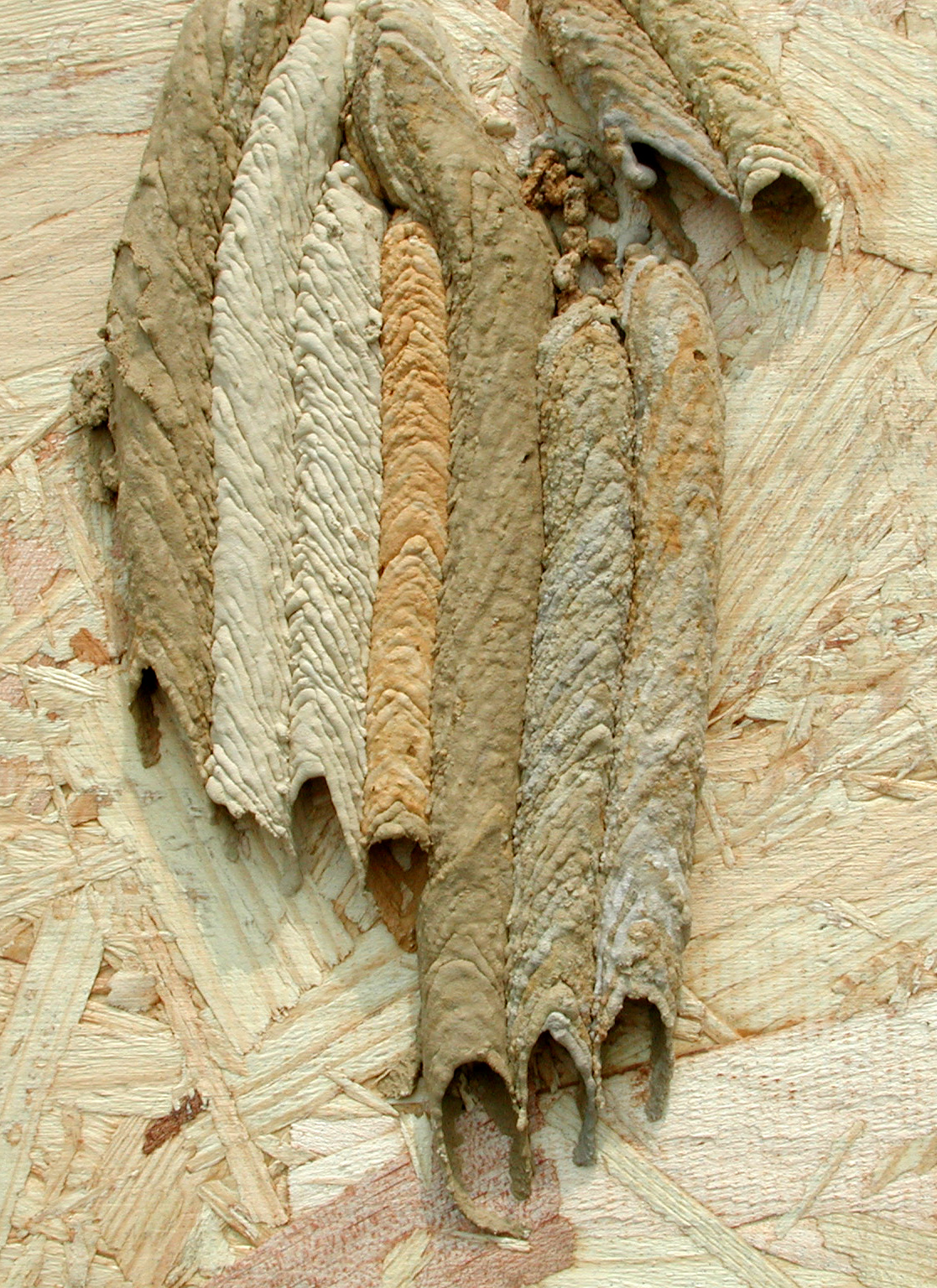
New organ pipe wasp nest showing different muds gathered at different places

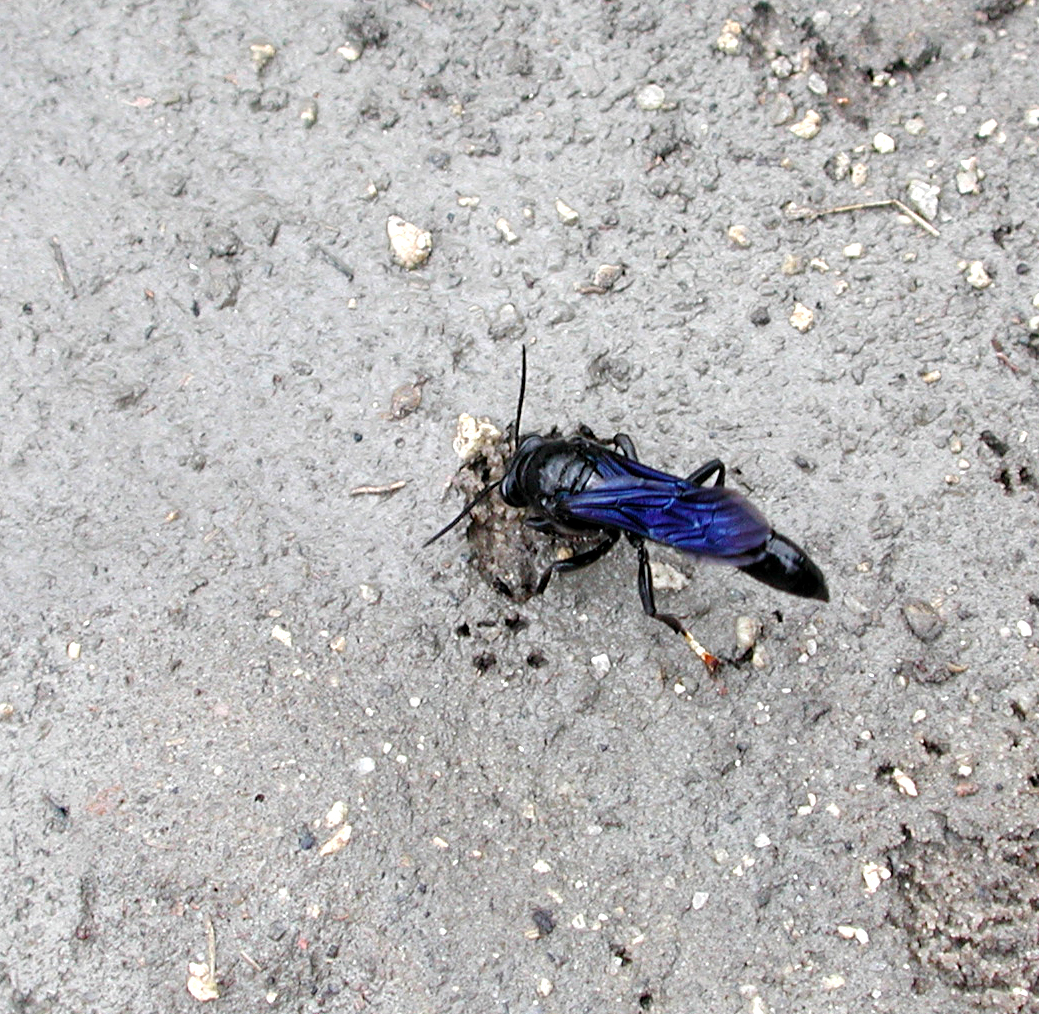
An organ pipe wasp gathering mud in South Carolina

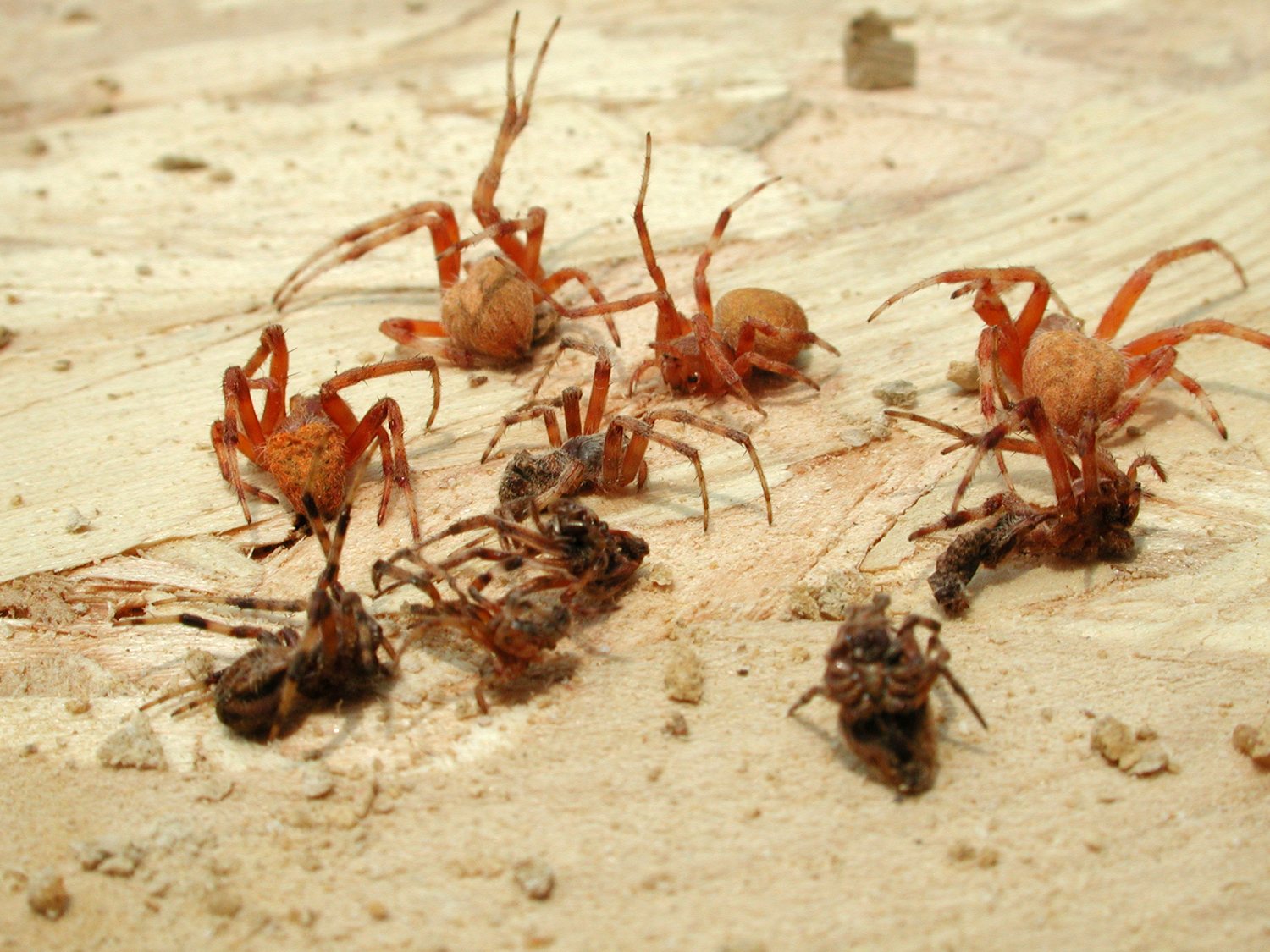
Paralyzed spiders taken from a cell in an organ pipe wasp nest

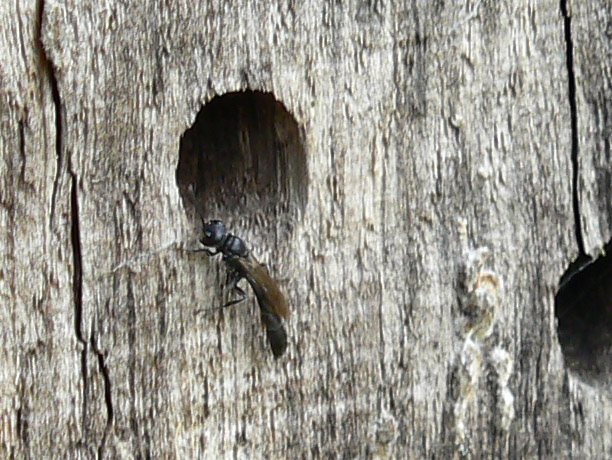
Trypoxylon figulus. A Palearctic species

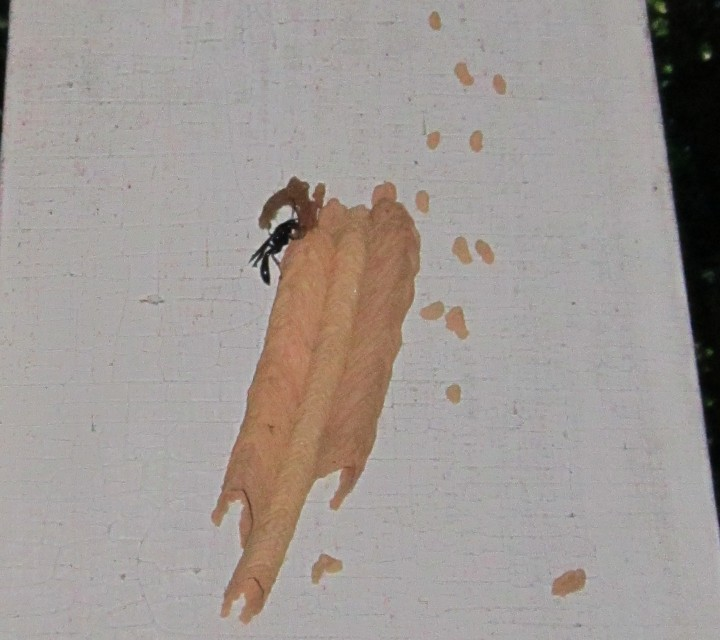
An organ pipe mud dauber adding to her nest in Virginia

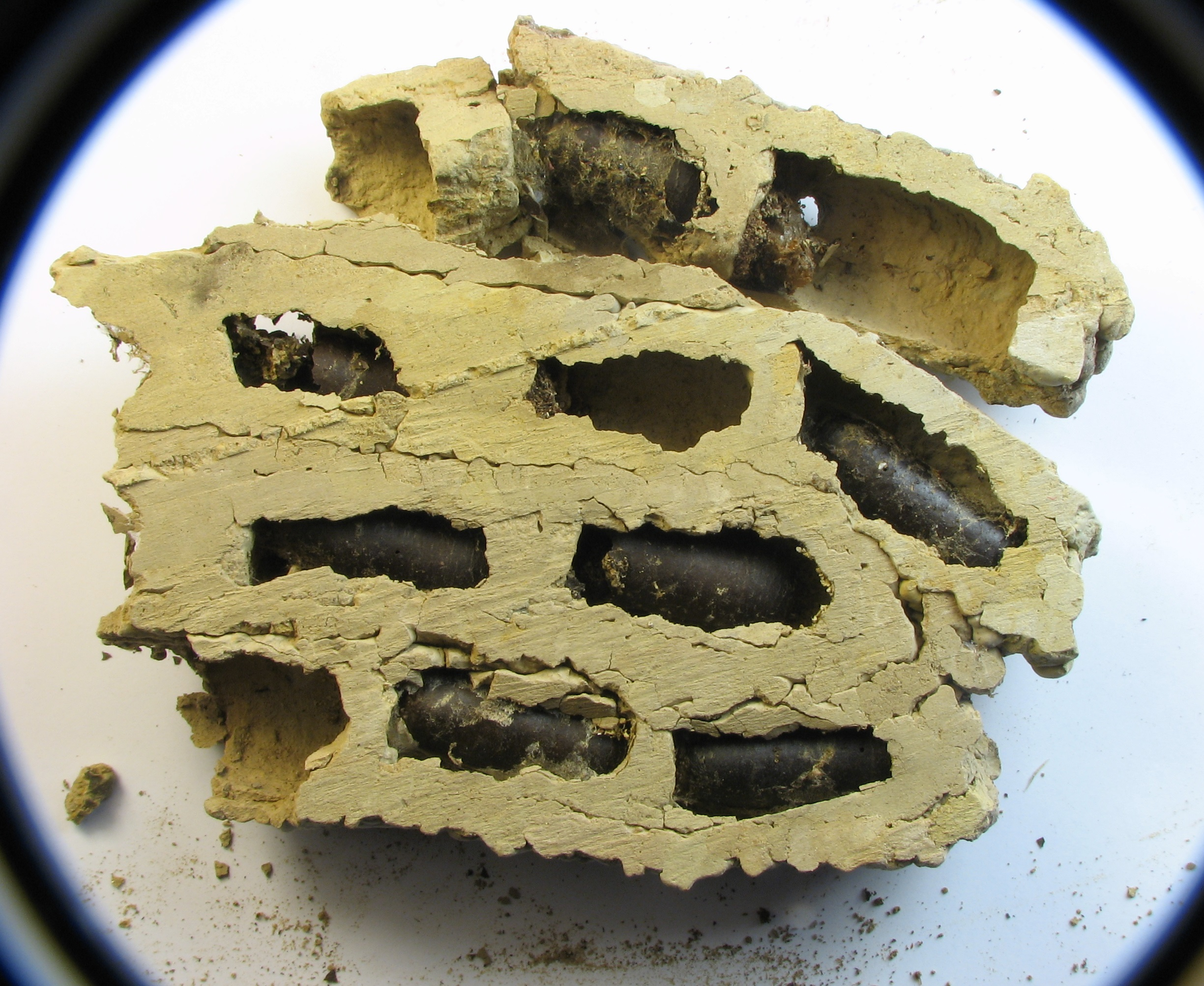
Nest underside

== See also ==
- Hermetia illucens
