= George Arnold (entomologist) =

British entomologist

George Arnold (1881, Hong Kong - 1962) was a British entomologist who specialised in aculeate Hymenoptera (particularly ants, sphecid wasps and pompilid wasps). From the Royal College of Science he was appointed to the Department of Cytology and Cancer Research at Liverpool and then only worked on Hymenoptera as a hobby. In 1911 he became curator, and later director, of the National Museum of Southern Rhodesia, Bulawayo.

The butterfly species Anthene arnoldi, or Arnold's hairtail, was named after him by Neville Jones in 1918.

== Works ==
Many scientific papers in Annals of the South African Museum and Occasional Papers: National Museum of Southern Rhodesia.

=== Papers on Apoid wasps (mostly Afrotropical) ===
Source: WaspWeb.

- Arnold, G. 1920. A revision of the South African species of the genus Sphex Linn. (olim Ammophila Kirby). Proceedings of the Rhodesia Scientific Association 18 (2):25-55, 2 pls.
- Arnold, G. 1922. The Sphegidae of South Africa. Part I. Annals of the Transvaal Museum 9:101-138.
- Arnold, G. 1923a. The Sphegidae of South Africa. Part II. Annals of the Transvaal Museum 9:143-190, plate V.
- Arnold, G. 1923b. The Sphegidae of South Africa. Part III. Annals of the Transvaal Museum 9:191-253.
- Arnold, G. 1923c. The Sphegidae of South Africa. Part IV. Annals of the Transvaal Museum 10:1-58.
- Arnold, G. 1924.The Sphegidae of South Africa. Part V. Annals of the Transvaal Museum 11:1-73, plates I-II.
- Arnold, G. 1925. The Sphegidae of South Africa. Part VI. Annals of the Transvaal Museum 11:137-175.
- Arnold, G. 1926. The Sphegidae of South Africa. Part VII. Annals of the Transvaal Museum 11:338-376.
- Arnold, G. 1927. The Sphegidae of South Africa. Part VIII. Annals of the Transvaal Museum 12:55-131.
- Arnold, G. 1928a. The Sphegidae of South Africa. Part IX. Annals of the Transvaal Museum 12:191-232, plate VIII.
- Arnold, G. 1928b. The Sphegidae of South Africa. Part X. Annals of the Transvaal Museum 12: 233-279, plates IX-XI.
- Arnold, G. 1928c. The Sphegidae of South Africa. Part XI. Annals of the Transvaal Museum 12:338-375.
- Arnold, G. 1929a. The Sphegidae of South Africa. Part XII. Annals of the Transvaal Museum 13:217-319.
- Arnold, G. 1929b. The Sphegidae of South Africa. Part XIII. Annals of the Transvaal Museum 13:320-380, plate VI.
- Arnold, G. 1929c. The Sphegidae of South Africa. Part XIV. Annals of the Transvaal Museum 13:381-418, plate VII.
- Arnold, G. 1930. A check-list of the Sphegidae of the Ethiopian Region. University Press, Cambridge, England. 21 pp.
- Arnold, G. 1931. The Sphegidae of South Africa. Part XV (conclusion). Annals of the Transvaal Museum 14:135-220.
- Arnold, G. 1932. New species of Ethiopian Sphegidae. Occasional Papers of the Rhodesian Museum 1:1-31.
- Arnold, G. 1933. Entomological expedition to Abyssinia, 1926-7. Hymenoptera, II.: Sphegidae and Psammocharidae. With an introductory note and supplementary list by Hugh Scott, Sc. D. The Annals and Magazine of Natural History (Series 10) 11:351-371.
- Arnold, G. 1935. Scientific results of the Vernay-Lang Kalahari expedition, March to September, 1930. Sphegidae and Psammocharidae. Annals of the Transvaal Museum 16: 497-505.
- Arnold, G. 1945 (1944). The Sphecidae of Madagascar. Cambridge University Press, Cambridge. 193 pp.
- Arnold, G. 1951. Sphecidae and Pompilidae (Hymenoptera) collected by Mr. K.M. Guichard in West Africa and Ethiopia. Bulletin of the British Museum (Natural History). Entomology 2:95-183.
- Arnold, G. 1960. Aculeate Hymenoptera from the Drakensberg Mountains, Natal. Annals of the Natal Museum 15: 79-87

=== Papers on Pompilidae (mostly Afrotropical) ===
- Arnold, G. 1932. The Psammocharidae (olim Pompilidae) of the Ethiopian region. Part I. Subfamily Pepsinae. Ann. Transvaal Mus. 14:284-396.
- Arnold, G. 1932. The Psammocharidae (olim Pompilidae) of the Ethiopian region. Part II. Subfamily Claveliinae. Ann. Transvaal Mus. 15:41-118.
- Arnold, G. 1933. Entomological expedition to Abyssinia, 1926-7. Hymenoptera, II.: Sphegidae and Psammocharidae. With an introductory note and supplementary list by Hugh Scott, Sc. D. The Annals and Magazine of Natural History ser. 10: v. 11 (63):351-371.
- Arnold, G. 1934. On three new and remarkable genera of the family Psammocharidae. Occasional papers of the Rhodesian Museum 3:1-9.
- Arnold, G. 1934. The Psammocharidae (olim Pompilidae) of the Ethiopian region. Part III. Subfamily Macromerinae. Ann. Transvaal Mus. 15:283-399.
- Arnold, G. 1935. The Psammocharidae (olim Pompilidae) of the Ethiopian region. Part IV. Subfamily Psammocharinae. Annals of the Transvaal Museum 15:413-483. Available through: https://journals.co.za/content/nfi_annalstm/14/4/AJA00411752_628
- Arnold, G. 1935. Scientific results of the vernaylang Kalahari expedition, March to September, 1930. Sphegidae and Psamocharidae. Annals of the Transvaal Museum 16:498-505.
- Arnold, G. 1936. The Psammocharidae (olim Pompilidae) of the Ethiopian region. Part V. Subfamily Psammocharinae continued. Ann. Transvaal Mus. 18:73-123.
- Arnold, G. 1936. The Psammocharidae (olim Pompilidae) of the Ethiopian region. Part VI. Subfamily Psammocharinae continued. Ann. Transvaal Mus. 18:415-460.
- Arnold, G. 1937. The Psammocharidae (olim Pompilidae) of the Ethiopian region. Part VII. Subfamily Psammocharinae continued. Annals of the Transvaal Museum 19:1-98.
- Arnold, G. 1939. Notes on some African Pompilidae and descriptions of new species. Occasional Papers of the National Museum of Southern Rhodesia 8:49-65.
- Arnold, G. 1940. A new genus and two new species of apterous Pompilidae (Hymenoptera) from Southern Rhodesia. Journal of the Entomological Society of Southern Africa 3:30-34. Available through: https://journals.co.za/content/JESSA/3/1/AJA00128789_2401
- Arnold, G. 1948. New species of African Hymenoptera No. 8. Occasional papers of the National Museum of Southern Rhodesia 14:213-250.
- Arnold, G. 1951. Sphecidae and Pompilidae (Hymenoptera) collected by Mr. K. M. Guichard in West Africa and Ethiopia. Bulletin of the British Museum (Natural History) Entomology 2 (3):96-187.
- Arnold, G. 1952. New species of African Hymenoptera No. 10. Occasional Papers of the National Museum of Southern Rhodesia 17:460-493.
- Arnold, G. 1955. New species of African Hymenoptera No. 11. Occasional Papers of the National Museum of Southern Rhodesia 20:733-762.
- Arnold, G. 1956. New species of African Hymenoptera, No. 12. Occasional Papers of the National Museum of Southern Rhodesia 21B:52-77.
- Arnold, G. 1958. New species of African Hymenoptera No. 13. Occasional Papers of the National Museum of Southern Rhodesia 22B:119-143.
- Arnold, G. 1959. New species of African Hymenoptera No. 14. Occasional Papers of the National Museum of Southern Rhodesia 23B:316-339.
- Arnold, G. 1960. New species of African Hymenoptera No. 15. Occasional Papers of the National Museum of Southern Rhodesia 24B:452-488.
- Arnold, G. 1960. Aculeate Hymenoptera from Drakensberg Mountains, Natal. Annals of the Natal Museum 15 (7):79-87.
- Arnold, G. 1960. XXXII. Hymenoptera Pompilidae. Ann. Mus. Congo Tervuren 81:437-445.
- Arnold, G. 1962. New species of African Hymenoptera No. 16. Occasional Papers of the National Museum of Southern Rhodesia 26B:844-855.
