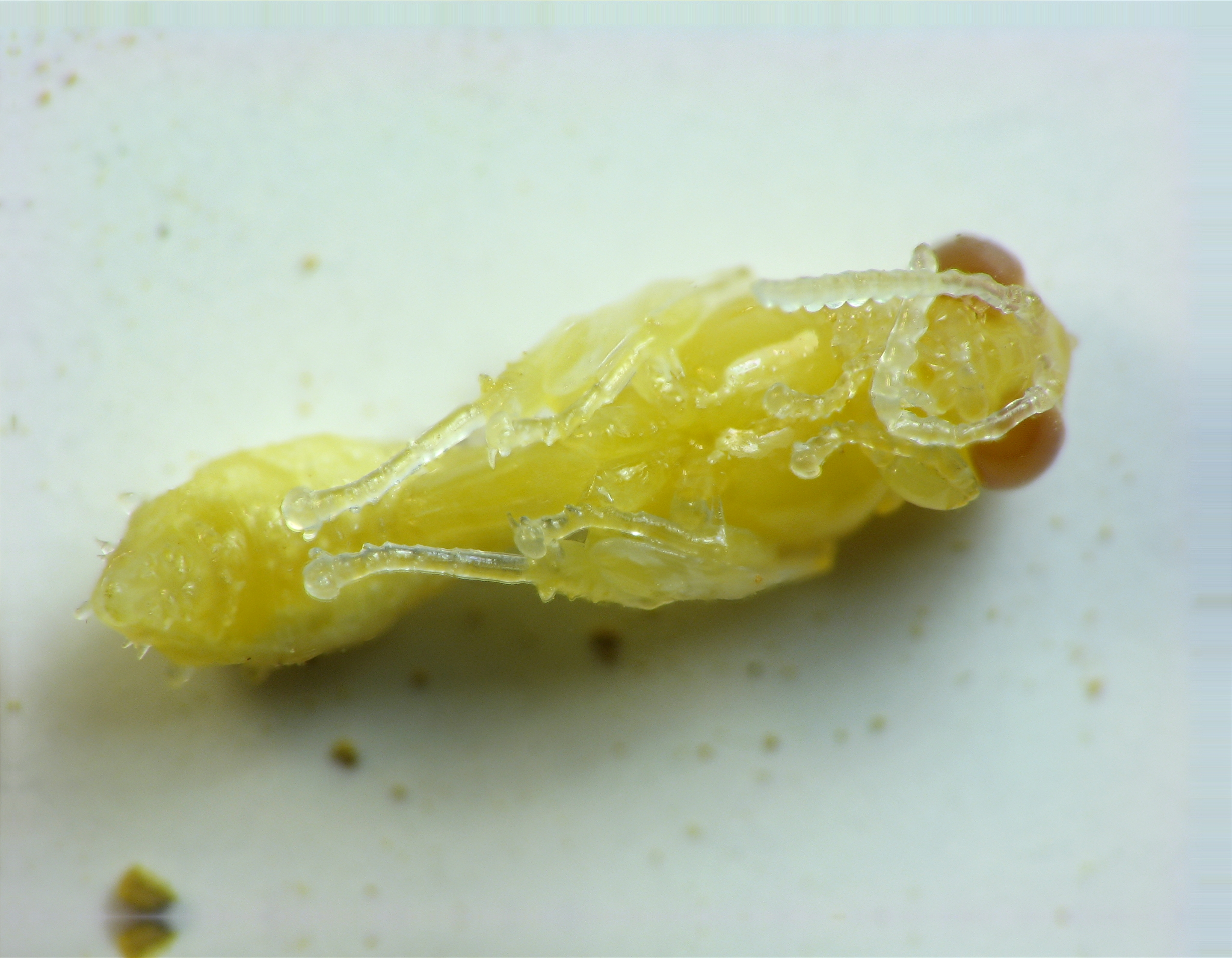
- Pupa, ventral view

Scientific classification
- Kingdom: Animalia
- Phylum: Arthropoda
- Clade: Pancrustacea
- Class: Insecta
- Order: Hymenoptera
- Family: Crabronidae
- Genus: Trypoxylon
- Species: T. collinum

Binomial name
- Trypoxylon collinum F. Smith, 1856

= Trypoxylon collinum =

Species of wasp

Trypoxylon collinum is a species of square-headed wasp in the family Crabronidae. It is found in North America. It nests inside hollow tubes.

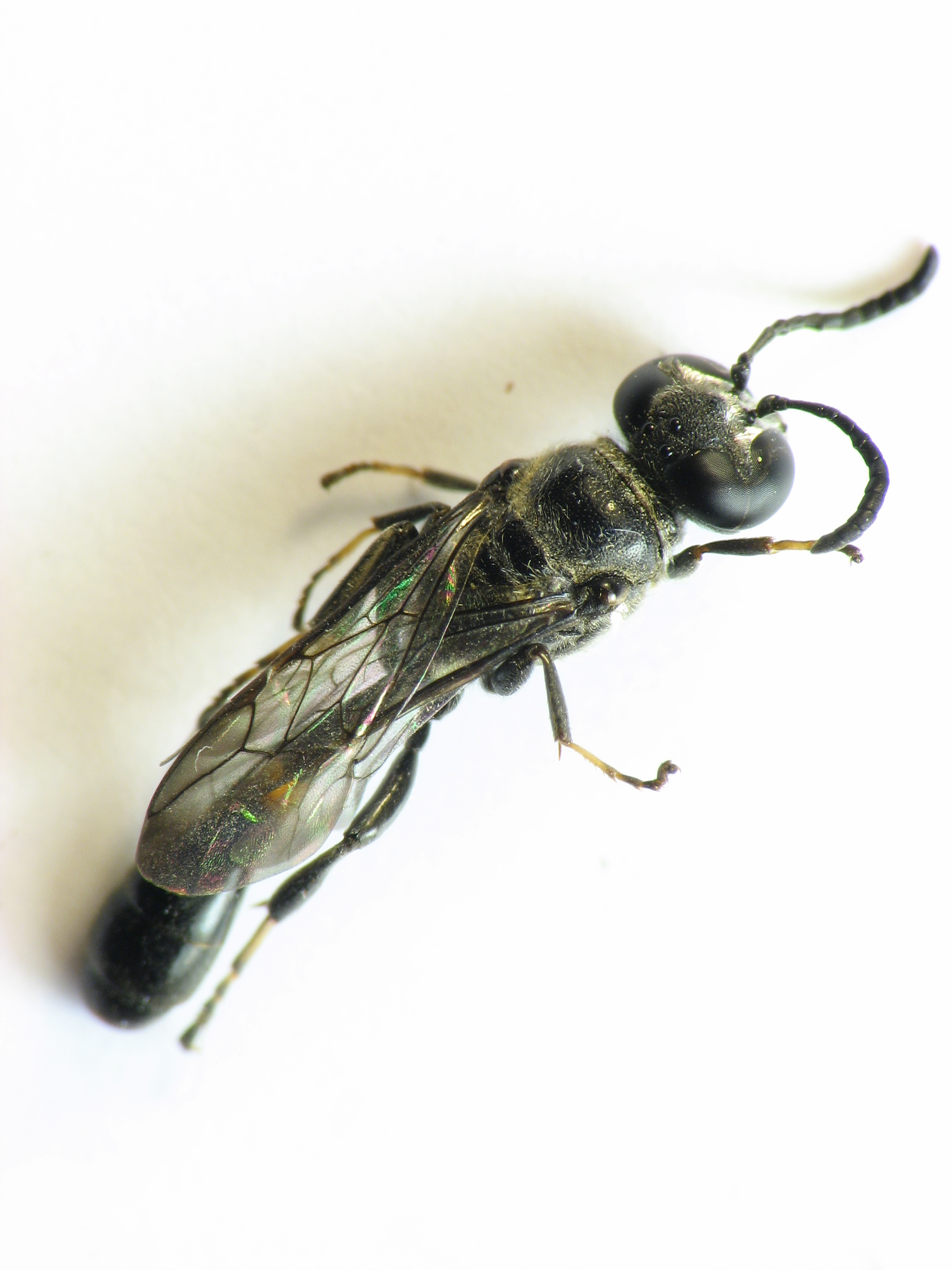
Adult

== Subspecies ==
These two subspecies belong to the species Trypoxylon collinum:

- Trypoxylon collinum collinum F. Smith, 1856^{i g}
- Trypoxylon collinum rubrocinctum Packard, 1867^{i c g}

Data sources: i = ITIS, c = Catalogue of Life, g = GBIF, b = Bugguide.net
