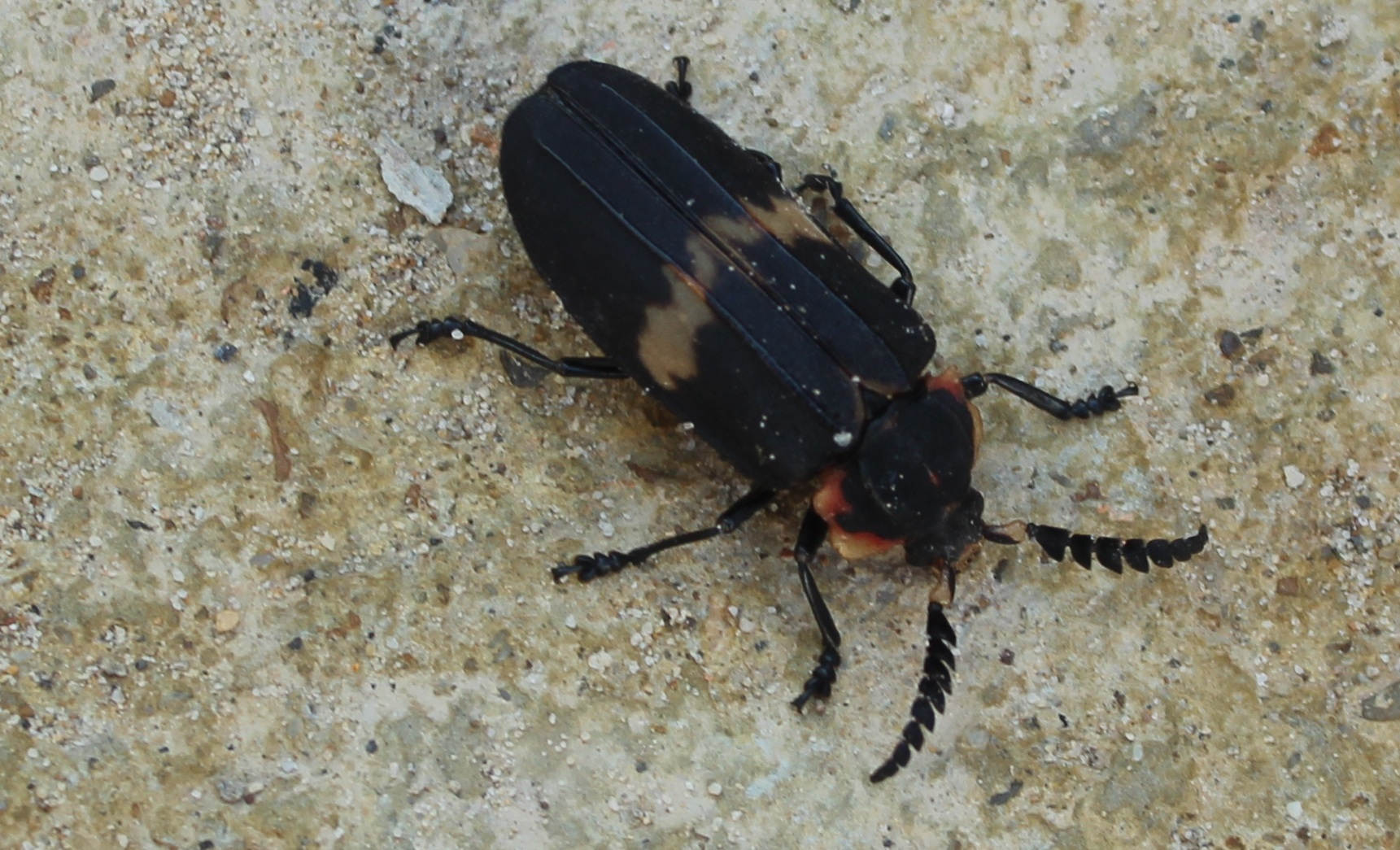

Scientific classification
- Kingdom: Animalia
- Phylum: Arthropoda
- Class: Insecta
- Order: Coleoptera
- Suborder: Polyphaga
- Infraorder: Cucujiformia
- Family: Cerambycidae
- Genus: Allocerus
- Species: A. dilaticorne

Binomial name
- Allocerus dilaticorne Gory, 1832

= Allocerus dilaticorne =

Species of beetle

Allocerus dilaticorne is a species of beetle in the family Cerambycidae. It was described by Gory in 1832.
