= Allocerus bicarinatum =

Scientific classification
- Domain: Eukaryota
- Kingdom: Animalia
- Phylum: Arthropoda
- Class: Insecta
- Order: Coleoptera
- Suborder: Polyphaga
- Infraorder: Cucujiformia
- Family: Cerambycidae
- Genus: Allocerus
- Species: A. bicarinatum

Binomial name
- Allocera bicarinatum (Monné & Monné, 1998)

Species of beetle

Allocerus bicarinatum is a species of beetle in the family Cerambycidae. It was described by Monné & Monné in 1998.
