= Allocerus spencei =

Scientific classification
- Domain: Eukaryota
- Kingdom: Animalia
- Phylum: Arthropoda
- Class: Insecta
- Order: Coleoptera
- Suborder: Polyphaga
- Infraorder: Cucujiformia
- Family: Cerambycidae
- Genus: Allocerus
- Species: A. spencei

Binomial name
- Allocerus spencei Kirby, 1818

Species of beetle

Allocerus spencei is a species of beetle in the family Cerambycidae. It was described by William Kirby in 1818.
