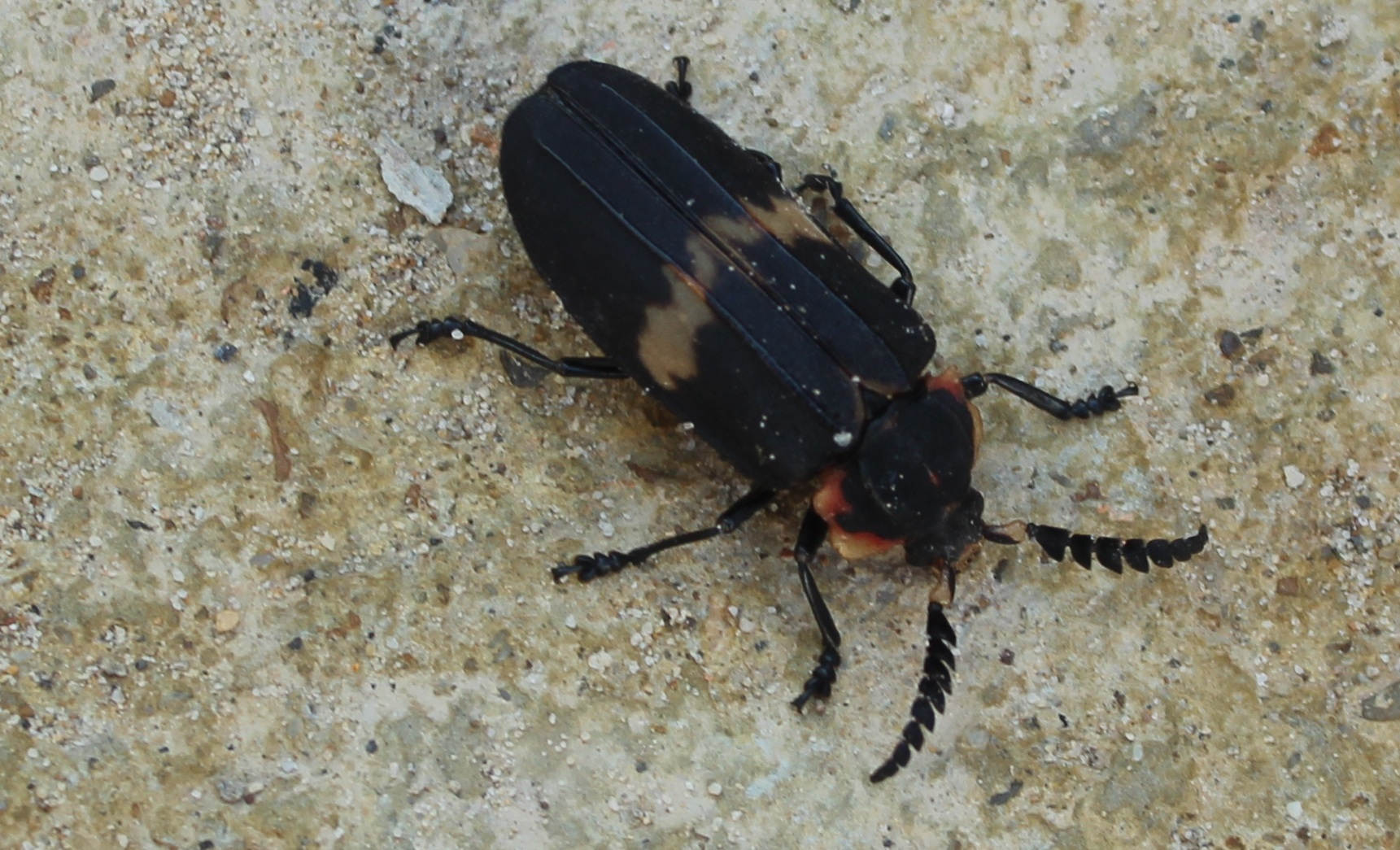
- Allocerus dilaticorne

Scientific classification
- Kingdom: Animalia
- Phylum: Arthropoda
- Class: Insecta
- Order: Coleoptera
- Suborder: Polyphaga
- Infraorder: Cucujiformia
- Family: Cerambycidae
- Genus: Allocerus; Lacordaire, 1830

= Allocerus =

Genus of beetles

Allocerus is a genus of beetles in the family Cerambycidae, containing the following species:

- Allocerus bicarinatum (Monné & Monné, 1998)
- Allocerus dilaticorne Gory, 1832
- Allocerus spencei (Kirby, 1818)
