= List of Andrena species =

Andrena lonicerae on a Lonicera gracilipes flower.

This list of Andrena species is an almost comprehensive listing of species of the mining bees belonging to the genus Andrena.

== A ==
- Andrena abbreviata Dours, 1873
- Andrena aberrans Eversmann, 1852
- Andrena abjecta Pérez, 1895
- Andrena ablegata (Cockerell, 1922)
- Andrena abrupta Warncke, 1967
- Andrena aburana Hirashima, 1962
- Andrena accepta Viereck, 1916 – two-spotted miner bee
- Andrena acerba Warncke, 1967
- Andrena aciculata Morawitz, 1886
- Andrena acrana Warncke, 1967
- Andrena aculeata LaBerge, 1980 – spiny miner bee
- Andrena acutilabris Morawitz, 1876
- Andrena adjacens Morawitz, 1876
- Andrena aegyptiaca Friese, 1899
- Andrena aegypticola Friese, 1922
- Andrena aeneiventris Morawitz, 1872
- Andrena aerifera LaBerge, 1967
- Andrena aerinifrons Dours, 1873
- Andrena aeripes LaBerge, 1967
- Andrena aetherea Warncke, 1974
- Andrena afghana Warncke, 1974
- Andrena afimbriata LaBerge, 1967
- Andrena afrensis Warncke, 1967
- Andrena africana Friese, 1909
- Andrena agilis Smith, 1879
- Andrena agilissima (Scopoli, 1770)
- Andrena agnata Warncke, 1967
- Andrena agoseridis Thorp, 1969
- Andrena ahenea Morawitz, 1876
- Andrena aiderensis Osytshnjuk, 1993
- Andrena ailisensis Osytshnjuk, 1993
- Andrena aino Tadauchi, Hirashima & Matsumura, 1987
- Andrena akitsushimae Tadauchi & Hirashima, 1984
- Andrena alamonis Viereck, 1917
- Andrena alashanica Popov, 1949
- Andrena albicaudata Hirashima, 1966
- Andrena albiculta Viereck, 1917
- Andrena albifacies Alfken, 1927
- Andrena albopicta Radoszkowski, 1874
- Andrena albopunctata (Rossi, 1792)
- Andrena albuginosa (Viereck, 1904)
- Andrena alceae LaBerge, 1986
- Andrena alchata Warncke, 1974
- Andrena alfkenella Perkins, 1914
- Andrena alfkenelloides Warncke, 1965
- Andrena algida Smith, 1853 – icy miner bee
- Andrena aliciae Robertson, 1891 – yellow-faced miner bee
- Andrena aliciarum Cockerell, 1897
- Andrena alijevi Osytshnjuk, 1986
- Andrena alleghaniensis Viereck, 1907 – Appalachian miner bee
- Andrena allosa Warncke, 1975
- Andrena alluaudi Benoist, 1961
- Andrena almas Tadauchi, Miyanaga & Dawut, 2005
- Andrena altaica Lebedev, 1932
- Andrena alutacea Stoeckhert, 1942
- Andrena amamiensis Hirashima, 1960
- Andrena amarilla Cockerell, 1949
- Andrena amicula Warncke, 1967
- Andrena amieti Praz, Müller & Genoud, 2019
- Andrena amoena Morawitz, 1876
- Andrena amphibola (Viereck, 1904) – amphibious miner bee
- Andrena ampla Warncke, 1967
- Andrena anatolica Alfken, 1935
- Andrena anatolis Linsley & MacSwain, 1961
- Andrena andrenoides (Cresson, 1878) – colourful willow miner bee
- Andrena androfovea Neff, Bossert & Hung, 2024
- Andrena angarensis Cockerell, 1929
- Andrena angelesia Timberlake, 1951
- Andrena angustella Cockerell, 1936
- Andrena angusticrus LaBerge, 1971
- Andrena angustifovea Viereck, 1904
- Andrena angustior (Kirby, 1802)
- Andrena angustitarsata Viereck, 1904 – narrow-legged miner bee
- Andrena anisochlora Cockerell, 1936
- Andrena annapurna Tadauchi & Matsumura, 2007
- Andrena annectens Ribble, 1968
- Andrena anograe Cockerell, 1901
- Andrena anonyma Cameron, 1897
- Andrena anthracina Morawitz, 1880
- Andrena anthrisci Blüthgen, 1925
- Andrena antigana Pérez, 1895
- †Andrena antoinei Michez & De Meulemeester, 2014
- Andrena antonitonis Viereck & Cockerell, 1914
- Andrena anzu Tadauchi & Hirashima, 1987
- Andrena apacheorum Cockerell, 1897
- Andrena apasta Linsley & MacSwain, 1961
- Andrena apicata Smith, 1847
- Andrena apiformis Kreichbaumer, 1873
- Andrena aquila LaBerge, 1971
- Andrena arabica Scheuchl & Gusenleitner, 2007
- Andrena arabis Robertson, 1897 – mustard miner bee
- Andrena arctostaphylae Ribble, 1968
- Andrena ardis LaBerge, 1967
- Andrena arenata Osytshnjuk, 1983
- Andrena arenicola LaBerge & Ribble, 1972
- Andrena argemonis Cockerell, 1896
- Andrena argentata Smith, 1844
- Andrena argentiscopa Viereck, 1917
- Andrena argyreofasciata Schmiedeknecht, 1900
- Andrena arima Cameron, 1909
- Andrena armeniaca Popov, 1940
- Andrena arsinoe Schmiedeknecht, 1900
- Andrena aruana Warncke, 1967
- Andrena asiatica Friese, 1921
- Andrena aspericollis Pérez, 1895
- Andrena asperrima Pérez, 1895
- Andrena asperula Osytshnjuk, 1977
- Andrena assimilis Radoszkowski, 1876
- Andrena asteris Robertson, 1891 – aster miner bee
- Andrena asteroides Mitchell, 1960
- Andrena astica Warncke, 1967
- Andrena astragali Viereck & Cockerell, 1914 – death camas miner bee
- Andrena astrella Warncke, 1975
- Andrena athenensis Warncke, 1965
- Andrena atlantica Mitchell, 1960
- Andrena atrata Friese, 1887
- Andrena atrohirta Morawitz, 1894
- Andrena atrotegularis Hedicke, 1923
- Andrena atypica (Cockerell, 1941)
- Andrena auricoma Smith, 1879
- Andrena auriculata Xu & Tadauchi, 2006 – golden-haired miner bee
- Andrena aurihirta Donovan, 1977
- Andrena auripes LaBerge, 1967
- Andrena austroinsularis Tadauchi & Hirashima, 1983
- Andrena autumnalis Viereck & Cockerell, 1914
- Andrena avara Warncke, 1967
- Andrena avulsa LaBerge & Ribble, 1972
- Andrena azerbaidshanica Lebedev, 1932

== B ==
- Andrena babai Tadauchi & Hirashima, 1987
- Andrena baeriae Timberlake, 1941
- Andrena bairacumensis Morawitz, 1876
- Andrena balsamorhizae LaBerge, 1967
- Andrena balucha Nurse, 1904
- Andrena banffensis Viereck, 1924
- Andrena banksi Malloch, 1917
- Andrena barbara Bouseman & LaBerge, 1979
- Andrena barbareae Panzer, 1805
- Andrena barberi Cockerell, 1898
- Andrena barbilabris (Kirby, 1802) – bearded miner bee
- Andrena basifusca Cockerell, 1930
- Andrena basimacula Alfken, 1929
- Andrena bassana Warncke, 1969
- Andrena batangensis Xu, 1994
- Andrena bayona Warncke, 1975
- Andrena beameri LaBerge, 1967
- Andrena beijingensis Xu, 1994
- Andrena bellidis Pérez, 1895
- Andrena bellidoides LaBerge, 1968
- Andrena bendensis Donovan, 1977
- Andrena benefica Hirashima, 1962
- Andrena bengasinensis Schulthess, 1924
- Andrena bentoni Cockerell, 1917
- Andrena berberidis Cockerell, 1905 – barberry miner bee
- Andrena berkeleyi Viereck & Cockerell, 1914
- Andrena bernardina Linsley, 1938
- Andrena bernicla Warncke, 1975
- Andrena biareola LaBerge, 1971
- Andrena biarmica Warncke, 1975
- Andrena bicarinata Morawitz, 1876
- Andrena bicolor Fabricius, 1775
- Andrena bicolorata (Rossi, 1790)
- Andrena biemarginata Nurse, 1904
- Andrena bifida Warncke, 1967
- Andrena biguttata Friese, 1923
- Andrena bilavia Osytshnjuk, 1994
- Andrena bilimeki LaBerge, 1967
- Andrena bimaculata (Kirby, 1802)
- Andrena binominata Smith, 1853
- Andrena birtwelli Cockerell, 1901 – Birtwell's miner bee
- Andrena bisalicis Viereck, 1908 – eastern willow miner bee
- Andrena biscutellata Viereck, 1917
- Andrena biskrensis Pérez, 1895
- Andrena bisulcata Morawitz, 1877
- Andrena blaisdelli Cockerell, 1924
- Andrena blanda Pérez, 1895
- Andrena blennospermatis Thorp, 1969
- Andrena bocensis Donovan, 1977
- Andrena bonasia Warncke, 1969
- Andrena bonivuri Osytshnjuk, 1984
- Andrena boronensis Linsley & MacSwain, 1962
- Andrena boyerella Dours, 1872
- Andrena braccata Viereck, 1907
- Andrena bradleyi Viereck, 1907 – Bradley's miner bee
- Andrena brasiliensis Vachal, 1901
- Andrena braunsiana Friese, 1887
- Andrena brevicornis Bouseman & LaBerge, 1979
- Andrena brevihirtiscopa Hirashima, 1962
- Andrena brevipalpis Cockerell, 1930 – short-tongued miner bee
- Andrena breviscopa Pérez, 1895
- Andrena brooksi Larkin, 2004
- Andrena brumanensis Friese, 1899
- Andrena bruneri Viereck & Cockerell, 1914
- Andrena buccata LaBerge, 1971
- Andrena bucculenta LaBerge & Ribble, 1972
- Andrena bucephala Stephens, 1846
- Andrena buckelli Viereck, 1924 – Buckell's miner bee
- Andrena bulgariensis Warncke, 1965
- Andrena bullata LaBerge, 1967
- Andrena burkelli Bingham, 1908
- Andrena butea Warncke, 1965
- Andrena byrsicola Schmiedeknecht, 1900
- Andrena bytinskii Warncke, 1969

== C ==
- Andrena caerulea Smith, 1879 – caerulean miner bee
- Andrena caeruleonitens Viereck, 1926
- Andrena caesia Warncke, 1974
- Andrena calandra Warncke, 1975
- Andrena californiensis Ribble, 1968
- Andrena caliginosa Viereck, 1916
- Andrena callopyrrha Cockerell, 1929
- Andrena callosa Warncke, 1967
- Andrena calvata LaBerge, 1967
- Andrena camellia Wu, 1977
- Andrena camissoniae Linsley & MacSwain, 1968
- Andrena canadensis Dalla Torre, 1896 – Canada miner bee
- Andrena candida Smith, 1879 – mock-orange miner bee
- Andrena candidiformis Viereck & Cockerell, 1914 – white-haired miner bee
- Andrena caneae Strand, 1915
- Andrena caneibia Strand, 1915
- Andrena canohirta (Friese, 1923)
- Andrena cantiaca Warncke, 1975
- Andrena canuta Warncke, 1975
- Andrena capillosa Morawitz, 1876
- Andrena capillosella Osytshnjuk, 1986
- Andrena capricornis Casad & Cockerell, 1896
- Andrena caprimulga Warncke, 1975
- Andrena cara Nurse, 1904
- Andrena carantonica Pérez, 1902
- Andrena carinata Morawitz, 1877
- Andrena carinifrons Morawitz, 1876
- Andrena carinigena Wu, 1982
- Andrena carlini Cockerell, 1901 – Carlinville miner bee
- Andrena caroli Pérez, 1895
- Andrena carolina Viereck, 1909 – Carolina miner bee
- Andrena carolinensis Mitchell, 1960
- Andrena casadae Cockerell, 1896
- Andrena caspica Morawitz, 1886
- Andrena castanea Warncke, 1975
- Andrena caudata Warncke, 1965
- Andrena ceanothi Viereck, 1917 – ceanothus miner bee
- Andrena ceanothifloris Linsley, 1938 – ceanothus flower miner bee
- Andrena cephalota Xu, 1994
- Andrena cerasifolii Cockerell, 1896 – cherry leaf miner bee
- Andrena cercocarpi Cockerell, 1936
- Andrena cerebrata Mitchell, 1960
- Andrena cervina Warncke, 1975
- Andrena chaetogastra Pittioni, 1950
- Andrena chalcogastra Brullé, 1839
- Andrena chalybaea (Cresson, 1878)
- Andrena chalybioides (Viereck, 1904)
- Andrena chaparralensis Neff & Larkin, 2002
- Andrena chapmanae Viereck, 1904 – Chapman's miner bee
- Andrena chekiangensis Wu, 1977
- Andrena chelma Warncke, 1975
- Andrena chengtehensis Yasumatsu, 1935
- Andrena cheni Dubitzky, 2006
- Andrena chersona Warncke, 1972
- Andrena cheyennorum Viereck & Cockerell, 1914
- Andrena chionospila Cockerell, 1917
- Andrena chippewaensis Mitchell, 1960
- Andrena chirisana Tadauchi, 1992
- Andrena chlorogaster Viereck, 1904 – green-bellied miner bee
- Andrena chlorosoma Linsley & MacSwain, 1961
- Andrena chlorura Cockerell, 1916
- Andrena christineae Dubitzky, 2006
- Andrena chromotricha Cockerell, 1899 – pigmented miner bee
- Andrena chrysochersonesus Baker, 1995
- Andrena chrysopus Pérez, 1903
- Andrena chrysopyga Schenck, 1853
- Andrena chrysosceles (Kirby, 1802)
- Andrena chylismiae Linsley & MacSwain, 1961
- Andrena ciconia Warncke, 1975
- Andrena cineraria (Linnaeus, 1758)
- Andrena cinerea Brullé, 1832
- Andrena cinereophila Warncke, 1965
- Andrena cinnamonea Warncke, 1975
- Andrena citrinihirta Viereck, 1917
- Andrena clarkella (Kirby, 1802) – Clark's miner bee
- Andrena cleodora (Viereck, 1904) – shiny-blue sculptured miner bee
- Andrena clusia Warncke, 1966
- Andrena clypella Strand, 1921
- Andrena coactipostica Viereck, 1917
- Andrena cochlearicalcar Lebedev, 1933
- Andrena coconina LaBerge, 1980
- Andrena coitana (Kirby, 1802)
- Andrena collata Nurse, 1904
- Andrena colletiformis Morawitz, 1874
- Andrena colletina Cockerell, 1906 – plasterer-like miner bee
- Andrena colonialis Morawitz, 1886
- Andrena columbiana Viereck, 1917 – British Columbia miner bee
- Andrena combaella Warncke, 1966
- Andrena combinata (Christ, 1791)
- Andrena combusta Morawitz, 1876
- Andrena commoda Smith, 1879 – advantaged miner bee
- Andrena communis Smith, 1879
- Andrena compositarum Thorp & LaBerge, 2005
- Andrena compta Lepeletier, 1841
- Andrena comptaeformis Gusenleitner & Schwarz, 2000
- Andrena comta Eversmann, 1852
- Andrena concinna Smith, 1853
- Andrena concinnula (Cockerell, 1898)
- Andrena confederata Viereck, 1917
- Andrena congrua LaBerge, 1977
- Andrena congruens Schmiedeknecht, 1884
- Andrena coracina LaBerge & Bouseman, 1970
- Andrena corax Warncke, 1967
- Andrena cordialis Morawitz, 1877
- Andrena cornelli Viereck, 1907
- Andrena coromanda Warncke, 1975
- Andrena corssubalpina Theunert, 2006
- Andrena coruscata LaBerge, 1977
- Andrena costillensis Viereck & Cockerell, 1914
- Andrena cragini Cockerell, 1899
- Andrena crassana Warncke, 1965
- Andrena crassepunctata Cockerell, 1931
- Andrena crataegi Robertson, 1893 – hawthorn miner bee
- Andrena crawfordi Viereck, 1909
- Andrena creberrima Pérez, 1895
- Andrena crecca Warncke, 1965
- Andrena cressonii Robertson, 1891 – dotted miner bee
- Andrena crinita Bouseman & LaBerge, 1979
- Andrena crispa Warncke, 1975
- Andrena cristata Viereck, 1917 – crested miner bee
- Andrena critica Mitchell, 1960
- Andrena crocusella Pisanty & Scheuchl, 2016
- Andrena cruciferarum Ribble, 1974
- Andrena crudeni LaBerge, 1971
- Andrena cryptanthae Timberlake, 1951
- Andrena cryptodonta Cockerell, 1922
- Andrena cubiceps Friese, 1914
- Andrena cubicepsella Warncke, 1975
- Andrena culucciae 2025
- Andrena cuneata Warncke, 1974
- Andrena cuneilabris Viereck, 1926 – wedgy-lipped miner bee
- Andrena cupreotincta Cockerell, 1901 – copper-tinted miner bee
- Andrena curiosa (Morawitz, 1877)
- Andrena curtivalvis Morice, 1899
- Andrena curtula Pérez, 1903
- Andrena curvana Warncke, 1965
- Andrena curvungula Thomson, 1870
- Andrena cussariensis Morawitz, 1886
- Andrena cyanomicans Pérez, 1895
- Andrena cyanophila Cockerell, 1906 – dimple-cheeked miner bee
- Andrena cyanosoma (Cockerell, 1916)
- Andrena cybele Gribodo, 1894
- Andrena cymatilis LaBerge, 1987
- Andrena cypria Pittioni, 1950
- Andrena cypricola Mavromoustakis, 1952

== D ==
- Andrena daeckei Viereck, 1907
- Andrena dallasiana Cockerell, 1910
- Andrena damara Warncke, 1968
- Andrena danini Pisanty & Scheuchl, 2016
- Andrena daphanea Warncke, 1974
- Andrena dapsilis LaBerge, 1971
- Andrena dargia Warncke, 1965
- Andrena dauma Warncke, 1969
- Andrena davidsoni Viereck & Cockerell, 1914
- Andrena davisi Viereck, 1907
- Andrena decaocta Warncke, 1967
- Andrena decipiens Schenck, 1861
- Andrena declinis LaBerge, 1977
- Andrena decollata Warncke, 1974
- Andrena decolorata LaBerge & Thorp, 2005
- Andrena delicatula Cockerell, 1918
- Andrena delphiensis Warncke, 1965
- Andrena dentata Smith, 1879
- Andrena denticulata (Kirby, 1802)
- Andrena dentiventris Morawitz, 1874
- Andrena deppeana Cockerell, 1910
- Andrena derbentina Morawitz, 1886
- Andrena deserta Warncke, 1974
- Andrena deserticola Timberlake, 1937
- Andrena dilleri Gusenleitner, 1998
- Andrena dimorpha Mitchell, 1960
- Andrena dinizi Warncke, 1975
- Andrena discophora Morawitz, 1876
- Andrena discors Erichson, 1841
- Andrena discreta Smith, 1879
- Andrena dissimulans Timberlake, 1951
- Andrena dissona Thorp & LaBerge, 2005
- Andrena distans Provancher, 1888 – distant miner bee
- Andrena distinguenda Schenck, 1871
- Andrena djelfensis Pérez, 1895
- Andrena dmitrii Osytshnjuk, 1993
- Andrena dolharubang Tadauchi & Xu, 1997
- Andrena dolini Osytshnjuk, 1979
- Andrena dolomellea Lanham, 1949
- Andrena dolosa Morawitz, 1894
- Andrena dorsalis Brullé, 1832
- Andrena dorsata (Kirby, 1802)
- Andrena doursana Dufour, 1853
- Andrena dreisbachorum LaBerge, 1967
- Andrena dubiosa Kohl, 1905
- Andrena duboisi Timberlake, 1951
- Andrena dunningi Cockerell, 1898 – Dunning's miner bee
- Andrena duplicata Mitchell, 1960
- Andrena durangoensis Viereck & Cockerell, 1914
- Andrena dzynnanica Popov, 1949

== E ==
- Andrena eburneoclypeata Lebedev, 1929
- Andrena echizenia Hirashima & Haneda, 1973
- Andrena edashigei Hirashima, 1960
- Andrena eddaensis Gusenleitner, 1998
- Andrena edwardsi Viereck, 1916 – Edwards's miner bee
- Andrena ehnbergi Morawitz, 1888
- Andrena elata Warncke, 1975
- Andrena elegans Giraud, 1863
- Andrena elisaria Gusenleitner, 1998
- Andrena ellinorae Grünwaldt & Osytshnjuk, 2005
- Andrena ellisiae Cockerell, 1914
- Andrena elmaria Gusenleitner, 1998
- Andrena elongatula Viereck, 1917
- Andrena emeiensis Wu, 1982
- Andrena enocki (Cockerell, 1898)
- Andrena enslinella Stoeckhert, 1924
- Andrena eoa Popov, 1949
- Andrena eothina Linsley & MacSwain, 1961
- Andrena erberi Morawitz, 1871
- Andrena eremnophila Thorp & LaBerge, 2005
- Andrena eremobia Guiglia, 1933
- Andrena erigeniae Robertson, 1891 – spring beauty miner bee
- Andrena ermolenkoi Osytshnjuk, 1984
- Andrena erythrogaster (Ashmead, 1890) – red-bellied miner bee
- Andrena erythronii Robertson, 1891 – trout lily miner bee
- Andrena esakii Hirashima, 1957
- Andrena escondida Cockerell, 1938
- Andrena euphorbiacea Scheuchl, 2005
- Andrena euzona Pérez, 1895
- Andrena everna Warncke, 1974
- Andrena eversmanni Radoszkowski, 1867
- Andrena evoluta Linsley & MacSwain, 1961 – evolving miner bee
- Andrena excellens Viereck, 1924
- Andrena exigua Erichson, 1835
- Andrena exquisita Warncke, 1975
- Andrena ezoensis Hirashima, 1965

== F ==
- Andrena fabalis Warncke, 1966
- Andrena fabrella Pérez, 1903
- Andrena faceta LaBerge, 1987
- Andrena fagopyri Xu & Tadauchi, 2005
- Andrena falcinella Warncke, 1969
- Andrena falsifica Perkins, 1915
- Andrena falsificissima Hirashima, 1966
- Andrena familiaris Smith, 1878
- Andrena fani Xu & Tadauchi, 2000
- Andrena farinosa Pérez, 1895
- Andrena fastuosa Smith, 1879
- Andrena fedtschenkoi Morawitz, 1876
- Andrena fenningeri Viereck, 1922
- Andrena ferghanica Morawitz, 1876
- Andrena ferox Smith, 1847
- Andrena ferrugineicrus Dours, 1872
- Andrena ferrugineipes LaBerge, 1977
- Andrena fertoni Pérez, 1895
- Andrena ferulae Pérez, 1895
- Andrena figurata Morawitz, 1866
- Andrena fimbriata Brullé, 1832
- Andrena fimbriatoides Scheuchl, 2004
- Andrena firuzaensis Popov, 1949
- Andrena flagella Nurse, 1904
- Andrena flaminea LaBerge, 1971
- Andrena flandersi Timberlake, 1937
- Andrena flavipes Panzer, 1799
- Andrena flavitarsis Morawitz, 1876
- Andrena flavobila Warncke, 1965
- Andrena flavofacies Nurse, 1904
- Andrena flavolateralis Xu & Tadauchi, 2000
- Andrena flexa Malloch, 1917
- Andrena flocculosa LaBerge & Ribble, 1972
- Andrena florea Fabricius, 1793
- Andrena florentina Magretti, 1883
- Andrena floricola Eversmann, 1852
- Andrena floridula Smith, 1878
- Andrena florivaga Eversmann, 1852
- Andrena forbesii Robertson, 1891 – Forbes's miner bee
- Andrena formosana Cockerell, 1911
- Andrena forsterella Osytshnjuk, 1978
- Andrena foveolata Hedicke, 1940
- Andrena foveopunctata Alfken, 1932
- Andrena foxii Cockerell, 1898
- Andrena fracta Casad & Cockerell, 1896
- Andrena fragilis Smith, 1853 – fragile miner bee
- Andrena fratercula Warncke, 1975
- Andrena freidbergi Pisanty & Scheuchl, 2018
- Andrena freygessneri Alfken, 1904
- Andrena fria Warncke, 1975
- Andrena frigida Smith, 1853 – cold miner bee
- Andrena fucata Smith, 1847
- Andrena fukaii Cockerell, 1914
- Andrena fukuokensis Hirashima, 1952
- Andrena fulgida LaBerge, 1980 – shiny miner bee
- Andrena fulica Warncke, 1974
- Andrena fuliginata Pérez, 1895
- Andrena fuligula Warncke, 1965
- Andrena fulminea LaBerge, 1967
- Andrena fulminoides LaBerge, 1967
- Andrena fulva (Müller, 1766)
- Andrena fulvago (Christ, 1791)
- Andrena fulvata Stoeckhert, 1930
- Andrena fulvicrista Viereck, 1924
- Andrena fulvida Schenck, 1853
- Andrena fulvipennis Smith, 1853
- Andrena fulvitarsis Brullé, 1832
- Andrena fumida Pérez, 1895
- Andrena fumosa LaBerge, 1967
- Andrena funerea Warncke, 1967
- Andrena furva Linsley & MacSwain, 1961
- Andrena fuscicauda (Viereck, 1904) – brown-tailed miner bee
- Andrena fuscicollis Morawitz, 1876
- Andrena fuscipes (Kirby, 1802)
- Andrena fuscocalcarata Morawitz, 1877
- Andrena fuscosa Erichson, 1835

== G ==
- Andrena galbula Warncke, 1975
- Andrena galilaea Pisanty & Scheuchl, 2018
- Andrena gallica Schmiedeknecht, 1883
- Andrena gallinula Warncke, 1975
- Andrena gamskrucki Warncke, 1965
- Andrena gangcana Xu & Tadauchi, 2000
- Andrena gardineri Cockerell, 1906
- Andrena garrula Warncke, 1965
- Andrena garzetta Warncke, 1975
- Andrena gasparella Patiny, 1998
- Andrena gazella Friese, 1922
- Andrena gelriae van der Vecht, 1927
- Andrena genalis Morawitz, 1880
- Andrena geranii Robertson, 1891 – geranium miner bee
- Andrena gibberis Viereck, 1924 – gibbous miner bee
- Andrena gigantimurus Tadauchi & Xu, 2002
- Andrena glabriventris Alfken, 1935
- Andrena glandaria Warncke, 1975
- Andrena glareola Warncke, 1969
- Andrena glidia Warncke, 1965
- Andrena gloriosa Osytshnjuk, 1993
- Andrena gnaphalii (Cockerell, 1938)
- Andrena gobi Tadauchi & Xu, 2002
- Andrena gordia Warncke, 1975
- Andrena gordoni Ribble, 1974
- Andrena gorkhana Tadauchi & Matsumura, 2007
- Andrena govinda Warncke, 1974
- Andrena gracillima Cameron, 1897
- Andrena graecella Warncke, 1965
- Andrena grandilabris Pérez, 1903
- Andrena granulitergorum Tadauchi & Xu, 2002
- Andrena granulosa Pérez, 1902
- Andrena gravida Imhoff, 1832
- Andrena gregaria Warncke, 1974
- Andrena grindeliae Donovan, 1977
- Andrena griseigena Warncke, 1975
- Andrena griseobalteata Dours, 1872
- Andrena griseohirta Alfken, 1936
- Andrena grossella Grünwaldt, 1976
- Andrena grozdanici Osytshnjuk, 1975
- Andrena guichardi Warncke, 1980
- Andrena gunaca Warncke, 1975
- Andrena gusenleitneri Tadauchi & Xu, 2002
- Andrena gussakovskii Lebedev, 1932
- Andrena guttata Warncke, 1969

== H ==
- Andrena haemorrhoa (Fabricius, 1781)
- Andrena halictoides Smith, 1869
- Andrena hallii Dunning, 1898
- Andrena hamulata LaBerge & Ribble, 1975
- Andrena hanedai Tadauchi, 1985
- Andrena hastulata LaBerge, 1986
- Andrena hattorfiana (Fabricius, 1775)
- Andrena haynesi Viereck & Cockerell, 1914 – Haynes's miner bee
- Andrena hebes Pérez, 1905
- Andrena hedikae Jaeger, 1934
- Andrena hedini Tadauchi & Xu, 2002
- Andrena heinrichi Grünwaldt, 2005
- Andrena heinzi Dubitzky, 2006
- Andrena helenica Warncke, 1965
- Andrena helianthi Robertson, 1891 – sunflower miner bee
- Andrena helianthiformis Viereck & Cockerell, 1914
- Andrena helouanensis Friese, 1899
- Andrena helvola (Linnaeus, 1758)
- Andrena hemileuca Viereck, 1904 – partly-haired miner bee
- Andrena henotica Warncke, 1975
- Andrena hera Nurse, 1904
- Andrena heraclei Robertson, 1897
- Andrena hermonella Scheuchl & Pisanty, 2016
- Andrena hermosa Ribble, 1968
- Andrena hesperia Smith, 1853
- Andrena heterodoxa Pérez, 1903
- Andrena heteropoda Cockerell, 1922
- Andrena hibernica Warncke, 1975
- Andrena hicksi Cockerell, 1925
- Andrena hieroglyphica Morawitz, 1876
- Andrena hierosolymitana Pisanty & Scheuchl, 2018
- Andrena hikosana Hirashima, 1957
- Andrena hilaris Smith, 1853
- Andrena hillana Warncke, 1968
- Andrena himalayaensis Wu, 1982
- Andrena himalayana Tadauchi & Matsumura, 2007
- Andrena hippotes Robertson, 1895 – Hippotes's miner bee
- Andrena hirashimai Tadauchi, 1985
- Andrena hirsutula Cockerell, 1936
- Andrena hirticincta Provancher, 1888 – hairy-belted miner bee
- Andrena hirticornis Pérez, 1895
- Andrena hispania Warncke, 1967
- Andrena hoffmanni Strand, 1915
- Andrena hondoica Hirashima, 1962
- Andrena hondurasica Cockerell, 1949
- Andrena hova Warncke, 1975
- Andrena humabilis Warncke, 1965
- Andrena humilis Imhoff, 1832
- Andrena humlaensis Scheuchl, 2005
- Andrena hunanensis Wu, 1977
- Andrena hungarica Friese, 1887
- Andrena hurdi Lanham, 1949
- Andrena hyacinthina Mavromoustakis, 1958
- Andrena hybrida Warncke, 1975
- Andrena hyemala Warncke, 1973
- Andrena hypoleuca Cockerell, 1939
- Andrena hypopolia Schmiedeknecht, 1884
- Andrena hystrix Schmiedeknecht, 1883

== I ==
- Andrena icterina Warncke, 1974
- Andrena igali Pisanty, 2026
- Andrena ignota LaBerge, 1967
- Andrena iliaca Warncke, 1969
- Andrena ilicis Mitchell, 1960
- Andrena illini Bouseman & LaBerge, 1979
- Andrena illinoiensis Robertson, 1891 – tufted miner bee
- Andrena illustris LaBerge, 1977
- Andrena illyrica Warncke, 1975
- Andrena imitatrix Cresson, 1872 – imitator miner bee
- Andrena immaculata Warncke, 1975
- Andrena impolita LaBerge, 1987
- Andrena impuncta Kirby, 1837
- Andrena impunctata Pérez, 1895
- Andrena incanescens Cockerell, 1923
- Andrena incisa Eversmann, 1852
- Andrena inclinata Viereck, 1916
- Andrena incognita Warncke, 1975
- Andrena inconstans Morawitz, 1877
- Andrena inculta LaBerge, 1967
- Andrena induta Morawitz, 1895
- Andrena infirma Morawitz, 1876
- Andrena initialis Morawitz, 1876
- Andrena innesi Gribodo, 1894
- Andrena insignis Warncke, 1974
- Andrena integra Smith, 1853 – intact miner bee
- Andrena intermedia Thomson, 1870
- Andrena iranella Popov, 1940
- Andrena irrasus LaBerge, 1967
- Andrena isabellina Warncke, 1969
- Andrena ishiharai Hirashima, 1953
- Andrena ishii Ribble, 1968
- Andrena ishikawai Hirashima, 1958
- Andrena isis Schmiedeknecht, 1900
- Andrena isocomae Timberlake, 1951
- Andrena ispida Warncke, 1965
- Andrena israelica Scheuchl & Pisanty, 2016

== J ==
- Andrena jakowlewi Morawitz, 1894
- Andrena jalalabadensis Warncke, 1974
- Andrena janthina Warncke, 1975
- Andrena japonica (Smith, 1873)
- Andrena jazleya Pohl & Larkin, 2006
- Andrena jeholensis Yasumatsu, 1935
- Andrena jennei Viereck, 1917
- Andrena jessicae Cockerell, 1896
- Andrena judaea Scheuchl & Pisanty, 2016
- Andrena jugorum Morawitz, 1877

== K ==
- Andrena kaguya Hirashima, 1965
- Andrena kaibabensis Ribble, 1974
- Andrena kalmiae Atwood, 1934 – kalmia miner bee
- Andrena kamarti Schmiedeknecht, 1900
- Andrena kamikochiana Hirashima, 1963
- Andrena kamtschatkaensis Friese, 1914
- Andrena kansuensis Alfken, 1936
- Andrena kathmanduensis Tadauchi & Matsumura, 2007
- Andrena kerriae Hirashima, 1965
- Andrena khabarovi Osytshnjuk, 1986
- Andrena khankensis Osytshnjuk, 1995
- Andrena khasania Osytshnjuk, 1995
- Andrena khosrovi Osytshnjuk, 1993
- Andrena kilikiae Warncke, 1969
- Andrena kintschouensis Hedicke, 1940
- Andrena kirgisica Osytshnjuk, 1994
- Andrena kishidai Yasumatsu, 1935
- Andrena knuthi Alfken, 1900
- Andrena knuthiana Cockerell, 1901 – Knuth's miner bee
- Andrena knuthiformis Hirashima, 1952
- Andrena komachi Hirashima, 1965
- Andrena komarowii Radoszkowski, 1886
- Andrena kondarensis Osytshnjuk, 1982
- Andrena konyella Warncke, 1975
- Andrena kopetica Osytshnjuk, 1993
- Andrena korbella Grünwaldt, 2005
- Andrena koreana Hirashima, 1952
- Andrena korleviciana Friese, 1887
- Andrena kornosica Mavromoustakis, 1954
- Andrena korovini Osytshnjuk, 1986
- Andrena kotenkoi Osytshnjuk, 1994
- Andrena krausiella Gusenleitner, 1998
- Andrena kraussi Michener, 1954
- Andrena kriechbaumeri Schmiedeknecht, 1883
- Andrena krigiana Robertson, 1901
- Andrena kristina Lanham, 1983
- Andrena kryzhanovskii Osytshnjuk, 1993
- Andrena kudiana Cockerell, 1924
- Andrena kumbhuensis Tadauchi & Matsumura, 2007
- Andrena kurda Warncke, 1975

== L ==
- Andrena labergei Ribble, 1968
- Andrena labergeiella Gusenleitner, 1998
- Andrena labialis (Kirby, 1802)
- Andrena labiata Fabricius, 1781
- Andrena labiatula Osytshnjuk, 1993
- Andrena laevis Osytshnjuk, 1983
- Andrena laeviventris Morawitz, 1876
- Andrena laghmana Warncke, 1974
- Andrena lagopus Latreille, 1809
- Andrena lamelliterga Ribble, 1968
- Andrena lamiana Warncke, 1965
- Andrena laminibucca Viereck & Cockerell, 1914 – ridge-mouthed miner bee
- Andrena langadensis Warncke, 1965
- Andrena lanhami LaBerge, 1980
- Andrena lapponica Zetterstedt, 1838
- Andrena lateralis Morawitz, 1876
- Andrena lathyri Alfken, 1899
- Andrena laticalcar Osytshnjuk, 1985
- Andrena laticeps Morawitz, 1877
- Andrena latifrons LaBerge, 1977
- Andrena latigena Wu, 1982
- Andrena latinensis Donovan, 1977
- Andrena lativentris Timberlake, 1951
- Andrena lauracea Robertson, 1897
- Andrena laurivora Warncke, 1974
- Andrena lauta LaBerge, 1977
- Andrena lawrencei Viereck & Cockerell, 1914 – Lawrence's miner bee
- Andrena layiae Timberlake, 1951
- Andrena lazoiana Osytshnjuk, 1995
- Andrena leaena Cameron, 1907
- Andrena ledermanni Schönitzer, 1997
- Andrena legata Nurse, 1904
- Andrena lehmanni Schönitzer, 1997
- Andrena lepida Schenck, 1861
- Andrena lepidii Ribble, 1968
- Andrena leptopyga Pérez, 1895
- Andrena lepurana Warncke, 1974
- Andrena leucocyanea Pérez, 1895
- Andrena leucofimbriata Xu & Tadauchi, 1995
- Andrena leucolippa Pérez, 1895
- Andrena leucomelaena Hedicke, 1940
- Andrena leucomystax Thorp & LaBerge, 2005
- Andrena leucophaea Lepeletier, 1841
- Andrena leucopsis Warncke, 1967
- Andrena leucorhina Morawitz, 1876
- Andrena leucura Warncke, 1974
- Andrena levigata LaBerge, 1967
- Andrena levipes LaBerge, 1967
- Andrena lewisorum Thorp, 1969
- Andrena lijiangensis Wu, 1992
- Andrena lillooetensis Viereck, 1924
- Andrena limassolica Mavromoustakis, 1948
- Andrena limata Smith, 1853
- Andrena limatula LaBerge, 1967
- Andrena limbata Eversmann, 1852
- Andrena limonii Osytshnjuk, 1983
- Andrena lindbergella Pittioni, 1950
- Andrena lineolata Warncke, 1968
- Andrena linsleyana Thorp, 1987
- Andrena linsleyi Timberlake, 1937
- Andrena livens Pérez, 1895
- Andrena livida LaBerge, 1977
- Andrena lomatii Ribble, 1974
- Andrena longibarbis Pérez, 1895
- Andrena longiceps Morawitz, 1895
- Andrena longifovea LaBerge, 1977
- Andrena longitibialis Hirashima, 1962
- Andrena lonicera Warncke, 1973
- Andrena lonicerae Tadauchi & Hirashima, 1988
- Andrena lucidicollis Morawitz, 1876
- Andrena lucidula Warncke, 1974
- Andrena lunata Warncke, 1975
- Andrena lupinorum Cockerell, 1906 – lupine miner bee
- Andrena luridiloma Strand, 1915
- Andrena luscinia Warncke, 1975
- Andrena lutea Warncke, 1967
- Andrena luteihirta Donovan, 1977

== M ==
- Andrena mackieae Cockerell, 1937
- Andrena macoupinensis Robertson, 1900 – Macoupin County miner bee
- Andrena macra Mitchell, 1951
- Andrena macrocephala Cockerell, 1916
- Andrena macroceps (Matsumura, 1912)
- Andrena macroptera Warncke, 1974
- Andrena macswaini Linsley, 1960
- Andrena maculipes Morawitz, 1876
- Andrena maderensis Cockerell, 1922
- Andrena maetai Hirashima, 1964
- Andrena magna Warncke, 1965
- Andrena magnipunctata Kim & Kim, 1989
- Andrena magunta Warncke, 1965
- Andrena maidaqi Scheuchl & Gusenleitner, 2007
- Andrena majalis Morawitz, 1876
- Andrena malacothricidis Thorp, 1969
- Andrena mali Tadauchi & Hirashima, 1987
- Andrena malickyi Gusenleitner & Schwarz, 2000
- Andrena mandibularis Robertson, 1892 – toothed miner bee
- Andrena mangkamensis Wu, 1982
- Andrena manifesta (Fox, 1894)
- Andrena mara Warncke, 1974
- Andrena marginata Fabricius, 1776
- Andrena mariae Robertson, 1891 – Maria miner bee
- Andrena mariana Warncke, 1968
- Andrena mariposorum Viereck, 1917
- Andrena marsae Schmiedeknecht, 1900
- Andrena maukensis Matsumura, 1911
- Andrena medeninensis Pérez, 1895
- Andrena media (Radoszkowski, 1891)
- Andrena mediocalens Cockerell, 1931
- Andrena medionitens Cockerell, 1902 – western red-legged miner bee
- Andrena mediovittata Pérez, 1895
- Andrena melacana Warncke, 1967
- Andrena melaleuca Pérez, 1895
- Andrena melanochroa Cockerell, 1898 – rose miner bee
- Andrena melanospila Cockerell, 1918
- Andrena melanota Warncke, 1975
- Andrena melba Warncke, 1966
- Andrena melittoides Friese, 1899
- Andrena mellea Cresson, 1868
- Andrena melliventris Cresson, 1872
- Andrena menahemella Scheuchl & Pisanty, 2016
- Andrena mendica Mitchell, 1960
- Andrena mentzeliae Cockerell, 1897
- Andrena mephistophelica Cameron, 1897
- Andrena merimna Saunders, 1908
- Andrena meripes Friese, 1922
- Andrena merriami Cockerell, 1901 – Merriam's miner bee
- Andrena merula Warncke, 1969
- Andrena mesillae Cockerell, 1896
- Andrena mesoleuca Cockerell, 1924
- Andrena metallescens Cockerell, 1906
- Andrena metasequoiae Tadauchi & Xu, 2003
- Andrena metuoensis Xu & Tadauchi, 2001
- Andrena mexicana LaBerge, 1967
- Andrena micheneri Ribble, 1968
- Andrena micheneriana LaBerge, 1978
- Andrena micheneriella Gusenleitner & Schwarz, 2000
- Andrena microcardia Pérez, 1895
- Andrena microchlora Cockerell, 1922 – small green miner bee
- Andrena microthorax Pérez, 1895
- Andrena miegiella Dours, 1873
- Andrena mikado Strand & Yasumatsu, 1938
- Andrena mikhaili Osytshnjuk, 1982
- Andrena milwaukeensis Graenicher, 1903 – Milwaukee miner bee
- Andrena mimbresensis Larkin, 2004
- Andrena mimetes Cockerell, 1929
- Andrena minapalumboi Gribodo, 1894
- Andrena miniata LaBerge, 1986
- Andrena minima Warncke, 1974
- Andrena minor (Radoszkowski, 1891)
- Andrena minutissima Osytshnjuk, 1995
- Andrena minutula (Kirby, 1802)
- Andrena minutuloides Perkins, 1914
- Andrena miranda Smith, 1879 – singular miner bee
- Andrena mirzojani Osytshnjuk, 1993
- Andrena misella Timberlake, 1951
- Andrena miserabilis Cresson, 1872 – smooth-faced miner bee
- Andrena mistrensis Grünwaldt, 2005
- Andrena mitakensis Hirashima, 1963
- Andrena mitis Schmiedeknecht, 1883
- Andrena miyamotoi Hirashima, 1964
- Andrena mocsaryi Schmiedeknecht, 1884
- Andrena mohavensis Ribble, 1974
- Andrena mojavensis Linsley & MacSwain, 1955
- Andrena mollissima Warncke, 1975
- Andrena monacha Warncke, 1965
- Andrena mongolica Morawitz, 1880
- Andrena monilia Warncke, 1967
- Andrena monilicornis Cockerell, 1896
- Andrena monoensis LaBerge, 1980
- Andrena monogonoparia Viereck, 1917
- Andrena montana Warncke, 1973
- Andrena montanula Osytshnjuk, 1986
- Andrena montarca Warncke, 1975
- Andrena monticola LaBerge, 1967
- Andrena montrosensis Viereck & Cockerell, 1914
- Andrena moquiorum Viereck & Cockerell, 1914
- Andrena mordax Morawitz, 1876
- Andrena moricei Friese, 1899
- Andrena morinella Warncke, 1975
- Andrena morio Brullé, 1832
- Andrena morosa Cameron, 1897
- Andrena morrisonella Viereck, 1917 – Morrison's miner bee
- Andrena mucida Kriechbaumer, 1873
- Andrena mucorea Morawitz, 1876
- Andrena mucronata Morawitz, 1871
- Andrena munakatai Tadauchi, 1985
- Andrena murana Warncke, 1967
- Andrena murietae Ribble, 1968
- Andrena murreensis Cockerell, 1923
- Andrena muscaria Warncke, 1965
- Andrena musica Gusenleitner, 1998
- Andrena mutini Osytshnjuk, 1986

== N ==
- Andrena najadana Warncke, 1975
- Andrena nana (Kirby, 1802)
- Andrena nanaeformis Noskiewicz, 1925
- Andrena nanshanica Popov, 1940
- Andrena nantouensis Dubitzky, 2006
- Andrena nanula Nylander, 1848
- Andrena nasica Lebedev, 1933
- Andrena nasipolita Strand, 1913
- Andrena nasonii Robertson, 1895 – bumped miner bee
- Andrena nasuta Giraud, 1863
- Andrena nativa Osytshnjuk, 1984
- Andrena nawai Cockerell, 1913
- Andrena nebularia Warncke, 1975
- Andrena neffi Larkin, 2004
- Andrena negevana Gusenleitner & Scheuchl, 2000
- Andrena nemophilae Ribble, 1968
- Andrena neocypriaca Mavromoustakis, 1956
- Andrena neomexicana LaBerge, 1967
- Andrena neonana Viereck, 1917
- Andrena neovirida Grünwaldt, 2005
- Andrena nesterovi Osytshnjuk, 1982
- Andrena nesteroviella Osytshnjuk, 1993
- Andrena nevadae Linsley & MacSwain, 1961
- Andrena nevadensis (Cresson, 1879) – long-faced miner bee
- Andrena nida Mitchell, 1960
- Andrena nigerrima Casad, 1896
- Andrena nigra Provancher, 1895
- Andrena nigrae Robertson, 1905 – black miner bee
- Andrena nigriceps (Kirby, 1802)
- Andrena nigricula LaBerge & Bouseman, 1977
- Andrena nigrihirta (Ashmead, 1890) – black-haired miner bee
- Andrena nigripes Provancher, 1895
- Andrena nigritula Cockerell, 1906
- Andrena nigroaenea (Kirby, 1802)
- Andrena nigrocaerulea Cockerell, 1897 – black and blue miner bee
- Andrena nigroclypeata Linsley, 1939
- Andrena nigrocyanea Saunders, 1908
- Andrena nigroolivacea Dours, 1873
- Andrena nigroviridula Dours, 1873
- Andrena nilotica Warncke, 1967
- Andrena nippon Tadauchi & Hirashima, 1983
- Andrena nisoria Warncke, 1969
- Andrena nitida (Müller, 1776)
- Andrena nitidicollis Morawitz, 1876
- Andrena nitidilabris Pérez, 1895
- Andrena nitidiuscula Schenck, 1853
- Andrena nitidula Pérez, 1903
- Andrena nivalis Smith, 1853 – snow miner bee
- Andrena niveata Friese, 1887
- Andrena niveimonticola Xu & Tadauchi, 1999
- Andrena niveobarbata Nurse, 1904
- Andrena nobilis Morawitz, 1874
- Andrena nothocalaidis (Cockerell, 1905) – false dandelion miner bee
- Andrena nothoscordi Robertson, 1897
- Andrena notophila Cockerell, 1933
- Andrena nova Popov, 1940
- Andrena nubecula Smith, 1853 – cloudy-winged miner bee
- Andrena nubica Warncke, 1975
- Andrena nucleola Warncke, 1973
- Andrena nuda Robertson, 1891 – naked miner bee
- Andrena nudigastroides Yasumatsu, 1935
- Andrena numida Lepeletier, 1841
- Andrena nupta Morawitz, 1876
- Andrena nuptialis Pérez, 1902
- Andrena nycthemera Imhoff, 1868

== O ==
- Andrena oblita Warncke, 1967
- Andrena obscuripennis Smith, 1853
- Andrena obscuripostica Viereck, 1916
- Andrena ochropa Warncke, 1974
- Andrena oedicnema Warncke, 1975
- Andrena oenas Warncke, 1975
- Andrena oenotherae Timberlake, 1937
- Andrena ofella LaBerge, 1967
- Andrena okabei Hirashima, 1957
- Andrena okinawana Matsumura & Uchida, 1926
- Andrena olivacea Viereck, 1916
- Andrena olympica Grünwaldt, 2005
- Andrena omninigra Viereck, 1917
- Andrena omogensis Hirashima, 1953
- Andrena oniscicolor (Viereck, 1904)
- Andrena opacifovea Hirashima, 1952
- Andrena opercula Wu, 1982
- Andrena optanda LaBerge, 1967
- Andrena oralis Morawitz, 1876
- Andrena orana Warncke, 1975
- Andrena orbitalis Morawitz, 1871
- Andrena orchidea Scheuchl, 2005
- Andrena orientaliella Osytshnjuk, 1986
- Andrena orientana Warncke, 1965
- Andrena orizabibia Strand, 1917
- Andrena ornata Morawitz, 1866
- Andrena orthocarpi Cockerell, 1936
- Andrena osmioides Cockerell, 1916
- Andrena osychniukae Osytshnjuk, 1977
- Andrena osytschnjukae Tadauchi & Xu, 2000
- Andrena oulskii Radoszkowski, 1867
- Andrena ounifa Warncke, 1974
- Andrena ovatula (Kirby, 1802)
- Andrena oviventris Pérez, 1895

== P ==
- Andrena pachucensis Donovan, 1977
- Andrena padoucorum Viereck & Cockerell, 1914
- Andrena paganettina Warncke, 1965
- Andrena pagophila Warncke, 1975
- Andrena palaestina Pisanty & Scheuchl, 2016
- Andrena pallidicincta Brullé, 1832
- Andrena pallidifovea (Viereck, 1904) – pale-faced miner bee
- Andrena pallidiscopa (Viereck, 1904)
- Andrena pallitarsis Pérez, 1903
- Andrena palpalis Timberlake, 1951
- Andrena palumba Warncke, 1974
- Andrena pandellei Pérez, 1895
- Andrena pandosa Warncke, 1968
- Andrena panfilovi Osytshnjuk, 1984
- Andrena pannosa Morawitz, 1876
- Andrena panurgimorpha Mavromoustakis, 1957
- Andrena panurgina De Stefani, 1887
- Andrena papagorum Viereck & Cockerell, 1914
- Andrena parachalybea Viereck, 1917
- Andrena paradisaea Warncke, 1975
- Andrena paradoxa Friese, 1921
- Andrena parathoracica Hirashima, 1957
- Andrena paraulica Hedicke, 1940
- Andrena pareklisiae Mavromoustakis, 1957
- Andrena parilis LaBerge, 1967
- Andrena parnassiae Cockerell, 1902
- Andrena parviceps Kriechbaumer, 1873
- Andrena passerina Warncke, 1974
- Andrena pastellensis Schwenninger, 2007
- Andrena patagiata LaBerge, 1987
- Andrena patella Nurse, 1903
- Andrena paucisquama Noskiewicz, 1924
- Andrena pavonia Warncke, 1974
- Andrena peckhami Cockerell, 1902 – Peckham's miner bee
- Andrena pecosana Cockerell, 1913
- Andrena pectidis (Cockerell, 1897)
- Andrena pectilis LaBerge, 1986
- Andrena pela Warncke, 1974
- Andrena pellucens Pérez, 1895
- Andrena pellucida Warncke, 1974
- Andrena pelopa Warncke, 1975
- Andrena penemisella LaBerge & Ribble, 1975
- Andrena pensilis Timberlake, 1938
- Andrena penutiani Ribble, 1968
- Andrena perahia Pisanty & Scheuchl, 2016
- Andrena perarmata Cockerell, 1898 – armed miner bee
- Andrena perezana Viereck & Cockerell, 1914
- Andrena peridonea Cockerell, 1920
- Andrena perimelas Cockerell, 1905
- Andrena perplexa Smith, 1853 – perplexed miner bee
- Andrena perpunctata LaBerge, 1967
- Andrena persimulata Viereck, 1917 – protuberance miner bee
- Andrena personata Robertson, 1897
- Andrena pertristis Cockerell, 1905 – sad miner bee
- Andrena pesenkoi Osytshnjuk, 1984
- Andrena peshinica Nurse, 1904
- Andrena pesleria Gusenleitner, 1998
- Andrena petrosa Warncke, 1974
- Andrena phaceliae Mitchell, 1960
- Andrena phaneroleuca Cockerell, 1929
- Andrena phenax Cockerell, 1898
- Andrena phoenicura Warncke, 1975
- Andrena pieli Xu & Tadauchi, 1995
- Andrena pilipes Fabricius, 1781
- Andrena pinkeunia Warncke, 1969
- Andrena piperi Viereck, 1904 – Piper's miner bee
- Andrena placata Mitchell, 1960 – peaceful miner bee
- Andrena plana Viereck, 1904
- Andrena planirostris Morawitz, 1876
- Andrena planiventris Dours, 1872
- Andrena planti Dubitzky, 2006
- Andrena platalea Warncke, 1975
- Andrena platydepressa Tadauchi & Xu, 1995
- Andrena platyparia Robertson, 1895 – plated miner bee
- Andrena platyrhina Cockerell, 1930
- Andrena plebeia LaBerge, 1986
- Andrena plumiscopa Timberlake, 1951
- Andrena plumosella Gusenleitner & Schwarz, 2002
- Andrena polemediana Mavromoustakis, 1956
- Andrena polemonii Robertson, 1891
- Andrena polita Smith, 1847
- Andrena ponomarevae Osytshnjuk, 1983
- Andrena pontica Warncke, 1972
- Andrena popovi Osytshnjuk, 1985
- Andrena porterae Cockerell, 1900 – Porter's miner bee
- Andrena potentillae Panzer, 1809
- Andrena praecocella Cockerell, 1917
- Andrena praecox (Scopoli, 1763)
- Andrena pratincola Warncke, 1974
- Andrena prima Casad, 1896
- Andrena primaeva Cockerell, 1909
- Andrena primulifrons Casad, 1896
- Andrena principalis LaBerge, 1986
- Andrena probata Warncke, 1973
- Andrena producta Warncke, 1973
- Andrena prolixa LaBerge, 1980
- Andrena prostomias Pérez, 1905
- Andrena proxima (Kirby, 1802)
- Andrena pruinosa Erichson, 1835
- Andrena prunella Warncke, 1974
- Andrena pruni Robertson, 1891
- Andrena prunifloris Cockerell, 1898
- Andrena prunorum Cockerell, 1896 – purple miner bee
- Andrena pseudocineraria Wu, 1982
- Andrena pseudothoracica Engel, 2005
- Andrena puffina Warncke, 1975
- Andrena pulicaria Warncke, 1975
- Andrena pullipennis Alfken, 1931
- Andrena pulverea Viereck, 1916
- Andrena pulverulenta Viereck, 1904
- Andrena punctatissima Morawitz, 1866
- Andrena punctifrons Morawitz, 1876
- Andrena punctiventris Morawitz, 1876
- Andrena punjabensis Cameron, 1908
- Andrena purpurascens Pérez, 1895
- Andrena purpureomicans Alfken, 1935
- Andrena pusilla Pérez, 1903
- Andrena puthua (Cockerell, 1910)
- Andrena pyropygia Kriechbaumer, 1873
- Andrena pyrozonata Friese, 1921
- Andrena pyrrhula Pérez, 1895

== Q ==
- Andrena qinhaiensis Xu, 1994
- Andrena quadrifasciata Morawitz, 1876
- Andrena quadrilimbata LaBerge, 1977
- Andrena quadrimaculata Friese, 1921
- Andrena quercina Cockerell, 1939
- Andrena querquedula Warncke, 1975
- Andrena quettensis Cockerell, 1917
- Andrena quinquepalpa Warncke, 1980
- Andrena quintiliformis Viereck, 1916 – western scaly miner bee
- Andrena quintilis Robertson, 1898 – eastern scaly miner bee
- Andrena qusumensis Wu, 1982

== R ==
- Andrena ramaleyi Cockerell, 1931
- Andrena ramayana Tadauchi & Matsumura, 2007
- Andrena ramlehiana Pérez, 1903
- Andrena ranunculi Schmiedeknecht, 1883
- Andrena ranunculorum Morawitz, 1877
- Andrena rava LaBerge, 1967
- Andrena raveni Linsley & MacSwain, 1961
- Andrena recurvirostra Warncke, 1975
- Andrena reflexa Cresson, 1872
- Andrena regularis Malloch, 1917 – regular miner bee
- Andrena rehni Viereck, 1907 – Rehn's miner bee
- Andrena relata Warncke, 1967
- Andrena repanda LaBerge, 1967
- Andrena reperta Warncke, 1974
- Andrena resoluta Warncke, 1973
- Andrena revelstokensis Viereck, 1924
- Andrena rhenana Stoeckhert, 1930
- Andrena rhypara Pérez, 1903
- Andrena rhyssonota Pérez, 1895
- Andrena ribblei LaBerge, 1977
- Andrena richardsi Hirashima, 1957
- Andrena robertsonii Dalla Torre, 1896 – Robertson's miner bee
- Andrena robervalensis Mitchell, 1960
- Andrena robinsoni Lanham, 1987
- Andrena robusta Warncke, 1975
- Andrena rodilla Donovan, 1977
- Andrena rogenhoferi Morawitz, 1872
- Andrena romankovae Osytshnjuk, 1995
- Andrena roripae Osytshnjuk, 1993
- Andrena rosae Panzer, 1801
- Andrena roscipes Alfken, 1933
- Andrena rothneyi Cameron, 1897
- Andrena rotundata Pérez, 1895
- Andrena rotundilabris Morawitz, 1877
- Andrena rozeni Linsley & MacSwain, 1955
- Andrena rubecula Warncke, 1974
- Andrena rubens LaBerge, 1967
- Andrena rubi Mitchell, 1960
- Andrena rubrotincta Linsley, 1938
- Andrena rudbeckiae Robertson, 1891
- Andrena rudolfae Osytshnjuk, 1986
- Andrena rufescens Pérez, 1895
- Andrena ruficrus Nylander, 1848
- Andrena rufina Morawitz, 1876
- Andrena rufitibialis Friese, 1899
- Andrena rufiventris Lepeletier, 1841
- Andrena rufizona Imhoff, 1834
- Andrena rufoclypeata Alfken, 1936
- Andrena rufomaculata Friese, 1921
- Andrena rufosignata Cockerell, 1902 – red-faced miner bee
- Andrena rufula Schmiedeknecht, 1883
- Andrena rugosa Robertson, 1891 – wrinkled miner bee
- Andrena rugothorace Warncke, 1965
- Andrena rugulosa Stoeckhert, 1935
- Andrena rugulosella Osytshnjuk, 1993
- Andrena runcinatae Cockerell, 1906 – planed miner bee
- Andrena rupshuensis Cockerell, 1911
- Andrena russula Lepeletier, 1841
- Andrena rusticola Warncke, 1975

== S ==
- Andrena saccata Viereck, 1904 – shifty miner bee
- Andrena saegeri Cockerell, 1939
- Andrena saettana Warncke, 1975
- Andrena sagarmathana Tadauchi & Matsumura, 2007
- Andrena sagittagalea Ribble, 1968
- Andrena sagittaria Warncke, 1968
- Andrena sakagamii Tadauchi, Hirashima & Matsumura, 1987
- Andrena salicifloris Cockerell, 1897 – willow flower miner bee
- Andrena salicina Morawitz, 1877
- Andrena salictaria Robertson, 1905 – small willow miner bee
- Andrena sandanskia Warncke, 1973
- Andrena santaclarae Ribble, 1974
- Andrena saragamineensis Hirashima, 1962
- Andrena sardoa Lepeletier, 1841
- Andrena sarta Morawitz, 1876
- Andrena sarydzhasi Osytshnjuk, 2005
- Andrena sasakii Cockerell, 1913
- Andrena satellita Nurse, 1904
- Andrena saturata Warncke, 1975
- Andrena savignyi Spinola, 1838
- Andrena saxonica Stoeckhert, 1935
- Andrena sayi Robertson, 1891
- Andrena schencki Morawitz, 1866
- Andrena scheuchli Dubitzky, 2006
- Andrena schlettereri Friese, 1896
- Andrena schmiedeknechti Magretti, 1883
- Andrena schoenitzeri Gusenleitner, 1998
- Andrena schuberthi Gusenleitner, 1998
- Andrena schuhi LaBerge, 1980 – Schuhi's miner bee
- Andrena schulzi Strand, 1921
- Andrena schwarzi Warncke, 1975
- Andrena scita Eversmann, 1852
- Andrena scotica Perkins, 1916
- Andrena scotoptera Cockerell, 1934
- Andrena sculleni LaBerge, 1967
- Andrena scurra Viereck, 1904 – joker miner bee
- Andrena scutellaris Morawitz, 1880
- Andrena scutellinitens Viereck, 1916 – shielded miner bee
- Andrena sedentaria Warncke, 1975
- Andrena sedumella Scheuchl & Pisanty, 2018
- Andrena segregans Cockerell, 1900
- Andrena segregata Osytshnjuk, 1982
- Andrena seitzi Alfken, 1935
- Andrena selcuki Scheuchl & Hazir, 2008
- Andrena selena Gusenleitner, 1994
- Andrena semiaenea Morawitz, 1876
- Andrena semiflava Lebedev, 1932
- Andrena semifulva Viereck, 1916
- Andrena semilaevis Pérez, 1903
- Andrena seminuda Friese, 1896
- Andrena semipunctata Cockerell, 1902
- Andrena semirubra Morawitz, 1876
- Andrena semirugosa Cockerell, 1924
- Andrena senecionis Pérez, 1895
- Andrena senex Eversmann, 1852
- Andrena senticulosa LaBerge, 1967
- Andrena sericata Imhoff, 1868
- Andrena serraticornis Warncke, 1965
- Andrena setosifemoralis Wu, 2000
- Andrena sexguttata Morawitz, 1877
- Andrena shakuensis Popov, 1949
- Andrena shawanensis Xu & Tadauchi, 1999
- Andrena shoshoni Ribble, 1974
- Andrena shteinbergi Osytshnjuk, 1993
- Andrena sibirica Morawitz, 1888
- Andrena sibthorpi Mavromoustakis, 1952
- Andrena siccata LaBerge, 1986
- Andrena siciliana Warncke, 1980
- Andrena sieverti Cockerell, 1906
- Andrena sigiella Gusenleitner, 1998
- Andrena sigmundi Cockerell, 1902 – Sigmund's miner bee
- Andrena signata Warncke, 1974
- Andrena sillata Warncke, 1975
- Andrena similis Smith, 1849
- Andrena simillima Smith, 1851
- Andrena simontornyella Noskiewicz, 1939
- Andrena simplex Smith, 1853 – simple miner bee
- Andrena simulata Smith, 1879
- Andrena singularis Viereck, 1924
- Andrena sinuata Pérez, 1895
- Andrena sitiliae Viereck, 1909
- Andrena sjunthensis Osytshnjuk, 1984
- Andrena skorikovi Popov, 1940
- Andrena sladeni Viereck, 1924 – Sladen's miner bee
- Andrena smaragdina Morawitz, 1876
- Andrena sobrina Warncke, 1975
- Andrena sodalis Smith, 1879
- Andrena sola Viereck, 1916 – lonely miner bee
- Andrena solenopalpa Benoist, 1945
- Andrena solidago Tadauchi & Xu, 2002
- Andrena solitaria Warncke, 1975
- Andrena solivaga LaBerge, 1967
- Andrena solutiscopa Scheuchl, 2005
- Andrena sonorensis LaBerge, 1967
- Andrena sordidella Viereck, 1918
- Andrena soror Dours, 1872
- Andrena speciosa Friese, 1899
- Andrena specularia Donovan, 1977
- Andrena sperryi (Cockerell, 1937)
- Andrena sphaeralceae Linsley, 1939
- Andrena sphecodimorpha Hedicke, 1942
- Andrena spinaria Warncke, 1974
- Andrena spiraeana Robertson, 1895 – goatsbeard miner bee
- Andrena splendidicollis Morawitz, 1895
- Andrena splendula Osytshnjuk, 1984
- Andrena spolata Warncke, 1968
- Andrena spreta Pérez, 1895
- Andrena squamata Wu, 1990
- Andrena stabiana Morice, 1899
- Andrena stagei Linsley & MacSwain, 1962
- Andrena statusa Gusenleitner, 1998
- Andrena steini Tadauchi & Xu, 2003
- Andrena stellaris Warncke, 1965
- Andrena stenofovea Scheuchl & Pisanty, 2018
- Andrena stepposa Osytshnjuk, 1977
- Andrena stigmatica Morawitz, 1895
- Andrena stipator LaBerge, 1971
- Andrena stoeckhertella Pittioni, 1948
- Andrena stolida Warncke, 1975
- Andrena stragulata Illiger, 1806
- Andrena strepera Warncke, 1975
- Andrena striata Wu, 1977
- Andrena striatifrons Cockerell, 1897 – line-faced miner bee
- Andrena strohmella Illiger, 1806
- Andrena suavis Timberlake, 1938
- Andrena subaenescens Morawitz, 1876
- Andrena subapasta Thorp, 1969
- Andrena subaustralis Cockerell, 1898 – southern miner bee
- Andrena subchalybea Viereck, 1916
- Andrena subconsobrina Popov, 1949
- Andrena subdepressa Timberlake, 1951
- Andrena sublayiae LaBerge & Bouseman, 1970
- Andrena sublevigata Hirashima, 1966
- Andrena sublisterelle Wu, 1982
- Andrena submaura Linsley, 1938
- Andrena submediocalens Wu, 1982
- Andrena submoesta Viereck, 1916
- Andrena submontana Wu, 1982
- Andrena subnigripes Viereck, 1916
- Andrena subniveata Osytshnjuk, 1993
- Andrena subnivosa Wu, 1982
- Andrena subopaca Nylander, 1848
- Andrena subopercula Wu, 1982
- Andrena subproximana Strand, 1913
- Andrena subrubicunda LaBerge, 1986
- Andrena subshawella Strand, 1915
- Andrena subsmaragdina Osytshnjuk, 1984
- Andrena subspinigera Cockerell, 1917
- Andrena subsquamiformis Tadauchi & Xu, 2000
- Andrena subtilis Smith, 1879 – subtle miner bee
- Andrena subtrita Cockerell, 1910 – unusual miner bee
- Andrena subvelutina Xu & Tadauchi, 1995
- Andrena suerinensis Friese, 1884
- Andrena sulcata Donovan, 1977
- Andrena surda Cockerell, 1910 – deaf miner bee
- Andrena susanneae Dubitzky, 2006
- Andrena susterai Alfken, 1914
- Andrena sylvatica Morawitz, 1877
- Andrena symphyti Schmiedeknecht, 1883
- Andrena synadelpha Perkins, 1914

== T ==
- Andrena tadauchii Gusenleitner, 1998
- Andrena tadorna Warncke, 1974
- Andrena tadzhica Popov, 1949
- Andrena taeniata Viereck, 1916
- Andrena taisetsusana Tadauchi & Hirashima, 1987
- Andrena taiwanella Dubitzky, 2002
- Andrena takachihoi Hirashima, 1964
- Andrena talina Xu & Tadauchi, 2002
- Andrena taniguchiae Hirashima, 1958
- Andrena taprobana Warncke, 1975
- Andrena taraxaci Giraud, 1861
- Andrena tarsata Nylander, 1848
- Andrena tateyamana Tamasana & Hirashima, 1984
- Andrena tatjanae Osytshnjuk, 1995
- Andrena taxana Warncke, 1975
- Andrena tecta Radoszkowski, 1876
- Andrena tegularis LaBerge, 1967
- Andrena tenuiformis Pittioni, 1950
- Andrena tenuis Morawitz, 1877
- Andrena tenuistriata Pérez, 1895
- Andrena tertaria Meunier, 1920
- Andrena testaceipes Saunders, 1908
- Andrena tetonorum Viereck & Cockerell, 1914
- Andrena teunisseni Gusenleitner, 1998
- Andrena texana Cresson, 1872
- Andrena thaspii Graenicher, 1903 – parsnip miner bee
- Andrena thomensis Cockerell, 1932
- Andrena thomsonii Ducke, 1898
- Andrena thoracica (Fabricius, 1775)
- Andrena tianshana Tadauchi & Xu, 1995
- Andrena tiaretta Warncke, 1974
- Andrena tibetensis Wu, 1982
- Andrena tibetica Xu & Tadauchi, 2005
- Andrena tibialis (Kirby, 1802)
- Andrena tildeni Ribble, 1974
- Andrena timberlakei Cockerell, 1929
- Andrena tinaria Gusenleitner, 1998
- Andrena tkalcui Gusenleitner & Schwarz, 2002
- Andrena tobiasi Osytshnjuk, 1983
- Andrena toelgiana Friese, 1921
- Andrena togashii Tadauchi & Hirashima, 1984
- Andrena toluca LaBerge, 1969
- Andrena tomentosa Morawitz, 1878
- Andrena tomora Warncke, 1975
- Andrena tonkaworum Viereck, 1917
- Andrena topazana Cockerell, 1906 – Topaz miner bee
- Andrena toralis LaBerge & Ribble, 1972
- Andrena torda Warncke, 1965
- Andrena torulosa LaBerge, 1971
- Andrena totana Warncke, 1974
- Andrena transbaicalica Popov, 1949
- Andrena transhissarica Popov, 1958
- Andrena transitoria Morawitz, 1871
- Andrena transnigra Viereck, 1904 – black-banded miner bee
- Andrena trapezoidea Viereck, 1917
- Andrena trapezoidina Viereck & Cockerell, 1914
- Andrena trevoris Cockerell, 1897 – Trevor's miner bee
- Andrena tridens Robertson, 1902 – trident miner bee
- Andrena tridentata (Kirby, 1802)
- Andrena trikalensis Warncke, 1965
- Andrena trimaculata LaBerge, 1967
- Andrena trimarginata (Radoszkowski, 1886)
- Andrena trimmerana (Kirby, 1802)
- Andrena tringa Warncke, 1973
- Andrena tringoides Osytshnjuk, 1993
- Andrena trinkoi Osytshnjuk, 1984
- Andrena triquestra LaBerge, 1986
- Andrena trivialis Viereck, 1917
- Andrena trizonata (Ashmead, 1890) – three-zoned miner bee
- Andrena troodica Warncke, 1975
- Andrena truncatella Xu & Tadauchi, 1999
- Andrena truncatilabris Morawitz, 1877
- Andrena tscheki Morawitz, 1872
- Andrena tsingtauica Strand, 1915
- Andrena tsukubana Hirashima, 1957
- Andrena tuberculifera Pérez, 1895
- Andrena tunetana Schmiedeknecht, 1900
- Andrena turanica Osytshnjuk, 1993
- Andrena turkestana Warncke, 1967

== U ==
- Andrena uluhbeki Osytshnjuk, 1984
- Andrena ulula Warncke, 1969
- Andrena ungeri Mavromoustakis, 1952
- Andrena unicincta Friese, 1899
- Andrena unicostata LaBerge, 1971
- Andrena unita Nurse, 1904
- Andrena urarti Osytshnjuk, 1993
- Andrena urdula Warncke, 1965
- Andrena utahensis LaBerge, 1967
- Andrena uvulariae Mitchell, 1960
- Andrena uyacensis Cockerell, 1949

== V ==
- Andrena vacella Warncke, 1975
- Andrena vachali Pérez, 1895
- Andrena vaga Panzer, 1799
- Andrena valentinae Osytshnjuk, 1993
- Andrena valeriana Hirashima, 1957
- Andrena vanduzeei Linsley, 1938
- Andrena vandykei Cockerell, 1936
- Andrena varia Pérez, 1895
- Andrena variabilis Smith, 1853
- Andrena varians (Kirby, 1802)
- Andrena varicornis Pérez, 1895
- Andrena varsobiana Osytshnjuk, 1986
- Andrena vaulogeri Pérez, 1895
- Andrena venata LaBerge & Ribble, 1975
- Andrena venerabilis Alfken, 1935
- Andrena ventralis Imhoff, 1832
- Andrena ventricosa Dours, 1873
- Andrena verae Osytshnjuk, 1986
- Andrena verbesinae Viereck & Cockerell, 1914
- Andrena verecunda Cresson, 1872
- Andrena vernalis Mitchell, 1960
- Andrena verticalis Pérez, 1895
- Andrena vespertina Linsley & MacSwain, 1961
- Andrena vestali Cockerell, 1913
- Andrena vetula Lepeletier, 1841
- Andrena viciae Tadauchi & Xu, 2000
- Andrena vicina Smith, 1853 – neighbouring miner bee
- Andrena vicinoides Viereck, 1904 – Victoria miner bee
- Andrena vidalesi Cockerell, 1949
- Andrena vierecki Cockerell, 1904 – Viereck's miner bee
- Andrena viktorovi Osytshnjuk, 1983
- Andrena villipes Pérez, 1895
- Andrena vinnula LaBerge & Hurd, 1965
- Andrena violae Robertson, 1891
- Andrena virago Morawitz, 1895
- Andrena virescens Morawitz, 1876
- Andrena virgata Warncke, 1975
- Andrena virginiana Mitchell, 1960 – Virginia miner bee
- Andrena viridescens Viereck, 1916
- Andrena viridigastra Morawitz, 1876
- Andrena viridissima Ribble, 1968
- Andrena vitiosa Smith, 1879
- Andrena vogleri Larkin, 2004
- Andrena volgensis Osytshnjuk, 1994
- Andrena volka Warncke, 1969
- Andrena vulcana Dours, 1873
- Andrena vulpecula Kriechbaumer, 1873
- Andrena vulpicolor Cockerell, 1897
- Andrena vulpoides LaBerge, 1967

== W ==
- Andrena w-scripta Viereck, 1904 – w-marked miner bee
- Andrena waldmerei LaBerge & Bouseman, 1970
- Andrena walleyi Cockerell, 1932 – Walley's miner bee
- Andrena warnckei Gusenleitner & Schwarz, 2000
- Andrena washingtoni Cockerell, 1901 – Washington miner bee
- Andrena watasei Cockerell, 1913
- Andrena wellesleyana Robertson, 1897 – Wellesley's miner bee
- Andrena westensis Warncke, 1965
- Andrena westrichi Gusenleitner & Schwarz, 2000
- Andrena wheeleri Graenicher, 1904
- Andrena wilhelmi Schuberth, 1995
- Andrena wilkella (Kirby, 1802) – European legume miner bee
- Andrena wilmattae Cockerell, 1906
- Andrena winnemuccana LaBerge, 1973
- Andrena wolfi Gusenleitner & Scheuchl, 2000
- Andrena wollastoni Cockerell, 1922
- Andrena wuae Tadauchi & Xu, 1995

== X ==
- Andrena xanthigera Cockerell, 1900
- Andrena xinjiangensis Wu, 1985
- Andrena xiyuensis Xu & Tadauchi, 2005
- Andrena xuanzangi Tadauchi & Xu, 2003

== Y ==
- Andrena yamato Tadauchi & Hirashima, 1983
- Andrena yangi Dubitzky, 2006
- Andrena yasumatsui Hirashima, 1952
- Andrena yelkouan Warncke, 1975
- Andrena yukawai Tadauchi & Xu, 2004
- Andrena yunnanica Xu & Tadauchi, 2002

== Z ==
- Andrena zaaminensis Osytshnjuk, 1986
- Andrena zharkolia Osytshnjuk, 1994
- Andrena zhelokhovtzevi Osytshnjuk, 1993
- Andrena ziminae Osytshnjuk, 1986
- Andrena zionensis LaBerge, 1973
- Andrena ziziae Robertson, 1891
- Andrena ziziaeformis Cockerell, 1908
- Andrena zlatae Osytshnjuk, 1993
- Andrena zostera Warncke, 1975
- Andrena zuvandiana Osytshnjuk, 1994
