= Andrena pallidifovea =

Scientific classification
- Domain: Eukaryota
- Kingdom: Animalia
- Phylum: Arthropoda
- Class: Insecta
- Order: Hymenoptera
- Family: Andrenidae
- Genus: Andrena
- Species: A. pallidifovea

Binomial name
- Andrena pallidifovea (Viereck, 1904)

Species of bee

The pale-faced miner bee (Andrena pallidifovea) is a species of miner bee in the family Andrenidae. Another common name for this species is the pale-fovea andrena. It is found in Central America and North America.
