= Andrena candida =

Scientific classification
- Domain: Eukaryota
- Kingdom: Animalia
- Phylum: Arthropoda
- Class: Insecta
- Order: Hymenoptera
- Family: Andrenidae
- Genus: Andrena
- Species: A. candida

Binomial name
- Andrena candida Smith, 1879

Species of bee

The mock-orange miner bee (Andrena candida) is a species of miner bee in the family Andrenidae. It is found in Central America and North America.
