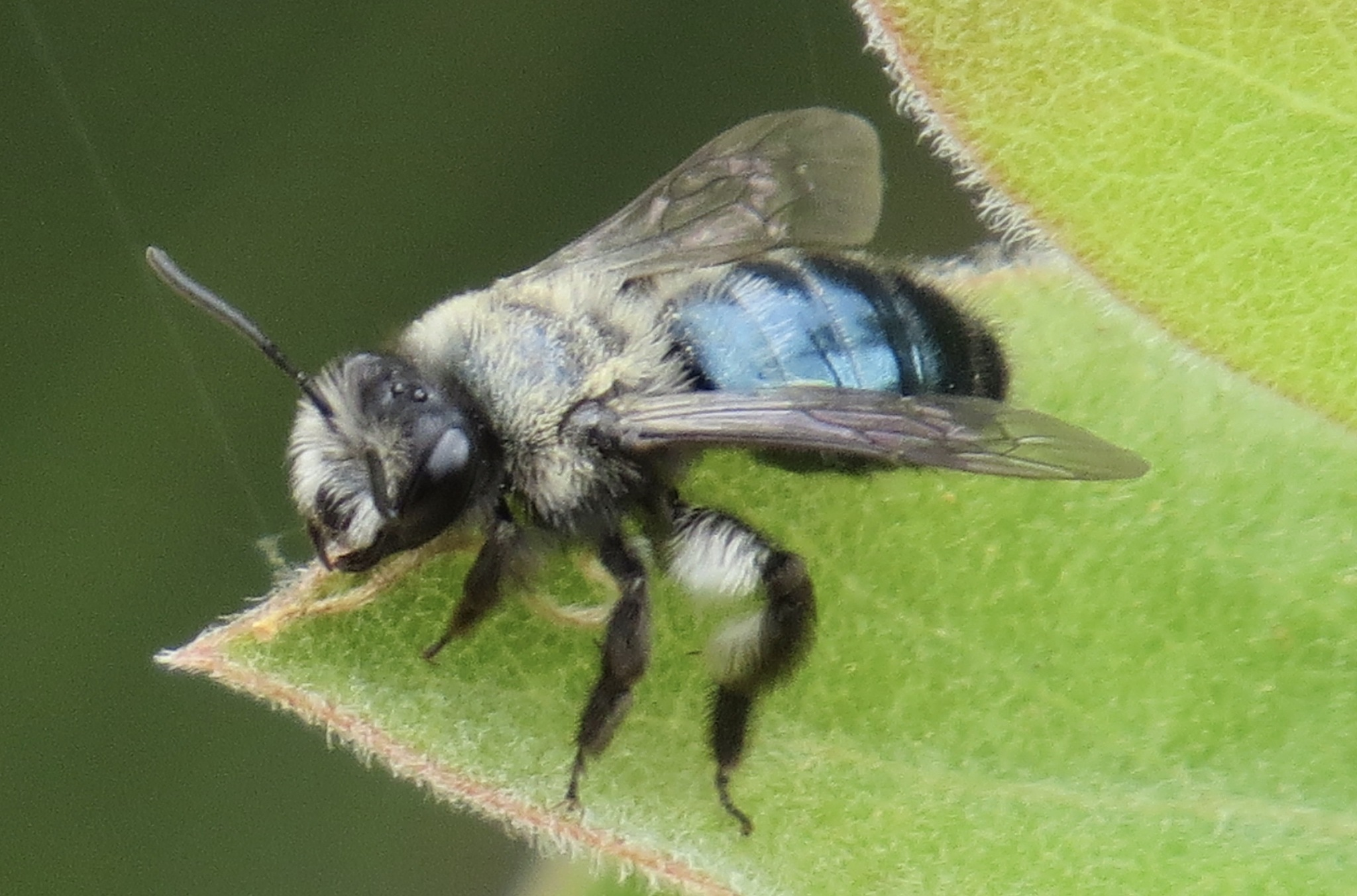

Scientific classification
- Kingdom: Animalia
- Phylum: Arthropoda
- Clade: Pancrustacea
- Class: Insecta
- Order: Hymenoptera
- Family: Andrenidae
- Genus: Andrena
- Species: A. cerasifolii

Binomial name
- Andrena cerasifolii Cockerell, 1896

Synonyms
- Andrena yumorum Viereck, 1961

= Andrena cerasifolii =

Species of bee

The cherry leaf miner bee (Andrena cerasifolii) is a species of miner bee in the family Andrenidae. Another common name for this species is cherry plum miner bee. It is found in Central America and North America.
