= Andrena canadensis =

Scientific classification
- Domain: Eukaryota
- Kingdom: Animalia
- Phylum: Arthropoda
- Class: Insecta
- Order: Hymenoptera
- Family: Andrenidae
- Genus: Andrena
- Species: A. canadensis

Binomial name
- Andrena canadensis Dalla Torre, 1896

Synonyms
- Andrena canadensis oslarella Viereck & Cockerell, 1914

Species of bee

The Canada miner bee (Andrena canadensis) is a species of miner bee in the family Andrenidae. Another common name for this species is the Canada andrena. It is found in North America.
