= Andrena sigmundi =

Scientific classification
- Kingdom: Animalia
- Phylum: Arthropoda
- Class: Insecta
- Order: Hymenoptera
- Family: Andrenidae
- Genus: Andrena
- Species: A. sigmundi

Binomial name
- Andrena sigmundi Cockerell, 1902

Species of bee

The Sigmund's miner bee (Andrena sigmundi) is a species of miner bee in the family Andrenidae. Another common name for this species is the Sigmund's andrena. It is found in North America.
