= Andrena buckelli =

Scientific classification
- Domain: Eukaryota
- Kingdom: Animalia
- Phylum: Arthropoda
- Class: Insecta
- Order: Hymenoptera
- Family: Andrenidae
- Genus: Andrena
- Species: A. buckelli

Binomial name
- Andrena buckelli Viereck, 1924

Species of bee

The Buckell's miner bee (Andrena buckelli) is a species of miner bee in the family Andrenidae. It is found in North America.
