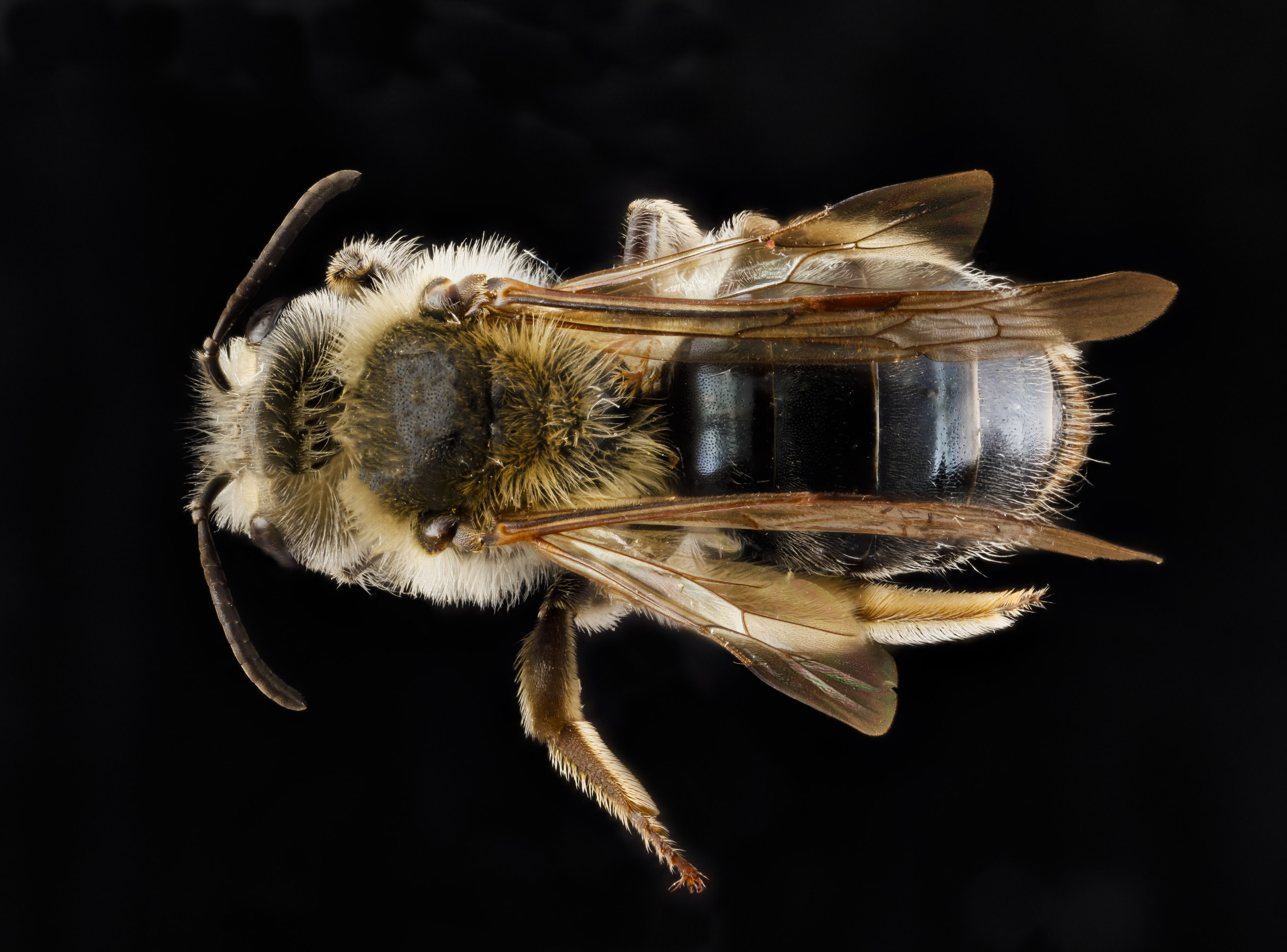

Scientific classification
- Domain: Eukaryota
- Kingdom: Animalia
- Phylum: Arthropoda
- Class: Insecta
- Order: Hymenoptera
- Family: Andrenidae
- Genus: Andrena
- Species: A. barbara

Binomial name
- Andrena barbara Bouseman & LaBerge, 1979

= Andrena barbara =

Species of bee

Andrena barbara is a species of mining bee in the family Andrenidae. It is found in North America.
