= Andrena nevadensis =

Scientific classification
- Domain: Eukaryota
- Kingdom: Animalia
- Phylum: Arthropoda
- Class: Insecta
- Order: Hymenoptera
- Family: Andrenidae
- Genus: Andrena
- Species: A. nevadensis

Binomial name
- Andrena nevadensis Cresson, 1879

Miner bee species in the family Andrenidae

The long-faced miner bee (Andrena nevadensis) is a species of miner bee in the family Andrenidae. It is found in North America.
