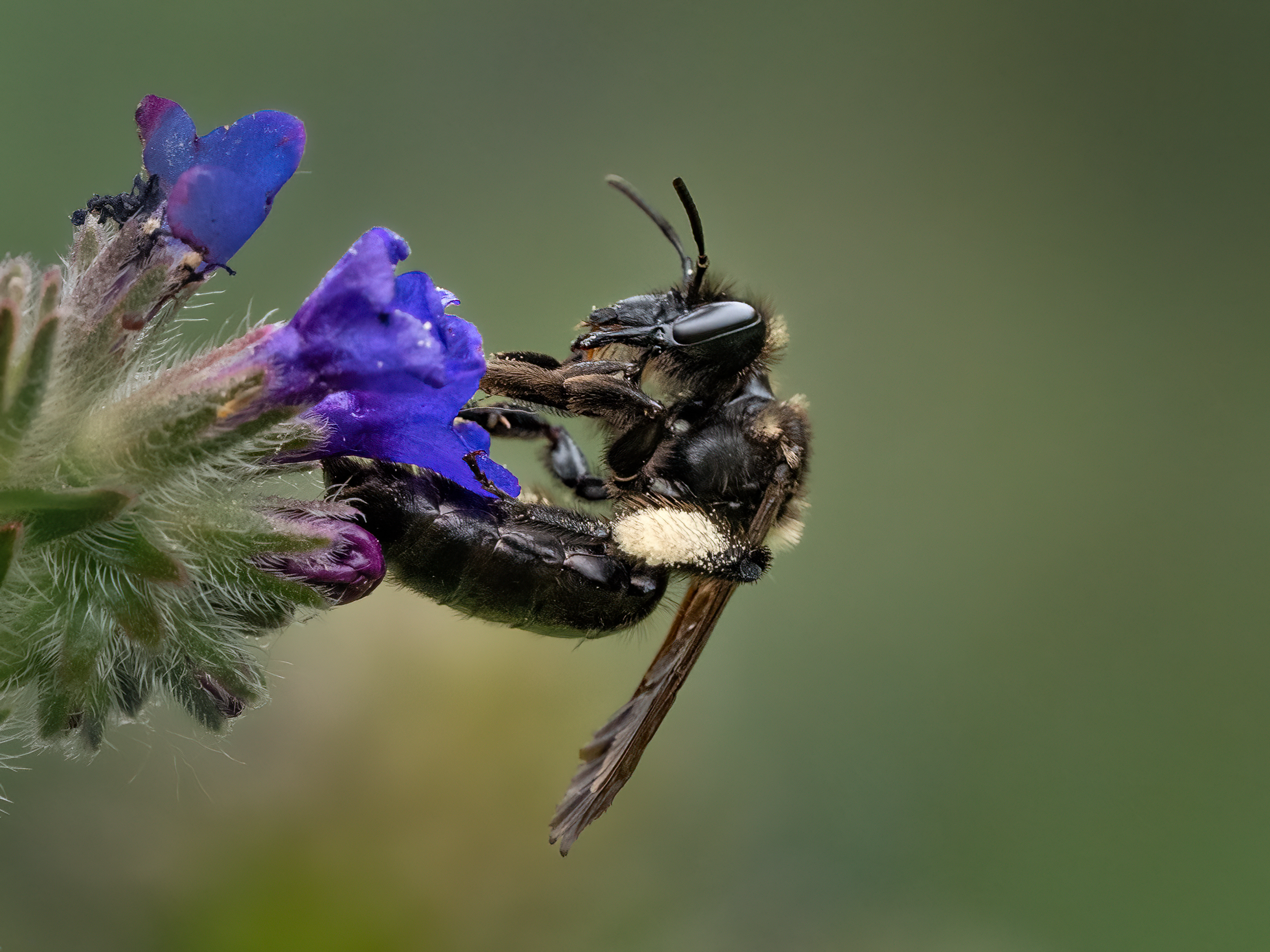
- Andrena nasuta - female

Scientific classification
- Kingdom: Animalia
- Phylum: Arthropoda
- Clade: Pancrustacea
- Class: Insecta
- Order: Hymenoptera
- Family: Andrenidae
- Genus: Andrena
- Species: A. nasuta

Binomial name
- Andrena nasuta Giraud, 1863

= Andrena nasuta =

Species of bee

Andrena nasuta is a species of insect belonging to the family Andrenidae.

It is native to Central Europe and Western Asia.
