= Andrena vicina =

- Female

Scientific classification
- Kingdom: Animalia
- Phylum: Arthropoda
- Clade: Pancrustacea
- Class: Insecta
- Order: Hymenoptera
- Family: Andrenidae
- Genus: Andrena
- Species: A. vicina

Binomial name
- Andrena vicina Smith, 1853

Species of bee

Andrena vicina, also known as the neighbouring miner bee, is a species of miner bee in the family Andrenidae. It is found in North America.
