= Andrena knuthiana =

Scientific classification
- Kingdom: Animalia
- Phylum: Arthropoda
- Class: Insecta
- Order: Hymenoptera
- Family: Andrenidae
- Genus: Andrena
- Species: A. knuthiana

Binomial name
- Andrena knuthiana Cockerell, 1901

Miner bee species in the family Andrenidae

The Knuth's miner bee (Andrena knuthiana) is a species of miner bee in the family Andrenidae. It is found in North America.
