= Andrena striatifrons =

Scientific classification
- Kingdom: Animalia
- Phylum: Arthropoda
- Class: Insecta
- Order: Hymenoptera
- Family: Andrenidae
- Genus: Andrena
- Species: A. striatifrons

Binomial name
- Andrena striatifrons Cockerell, 1897

Miner bee species in the family Andrenidae

The line-faced miner bee (Andrena striatifrons) is a species of miner bee in the family Andrenidae. It is found in North America.
