= Andrena perarmata =

Scientific classification
- Domain: Eukaryota
- Kingdom: Animalia
- Phylum: Arthropoda
- Class: Insecta
- Order: Hymenoptera
- Family: Andrenidae
- Genus: Andrena
- Species: A. perarmata

Binomial name
- Andrena perarmata Cockerell, 1898

Species of bee

Andrena perarmata, the armed miner bee, is a species of miner bee in the family Andrenidae. Another common name for this species is the well-armed andrena. It is found in North America.
