= Andrena aculeata =

Scientific classification
- Domain: Eukaryota
- Kingdom: Animalia
- Phylum: Arthropoda
- Class: Insecta
- Order: Hymenoptera
- Family: Andrenidae
- Genus: Andrena
- Species: A. aculeata

Binomial name
- Andrena aculeata LaBerge, 1980

Species of bee

The spiny miner bee (Andrena aculeata) is a species of miner bee in the family Andrenidae.
