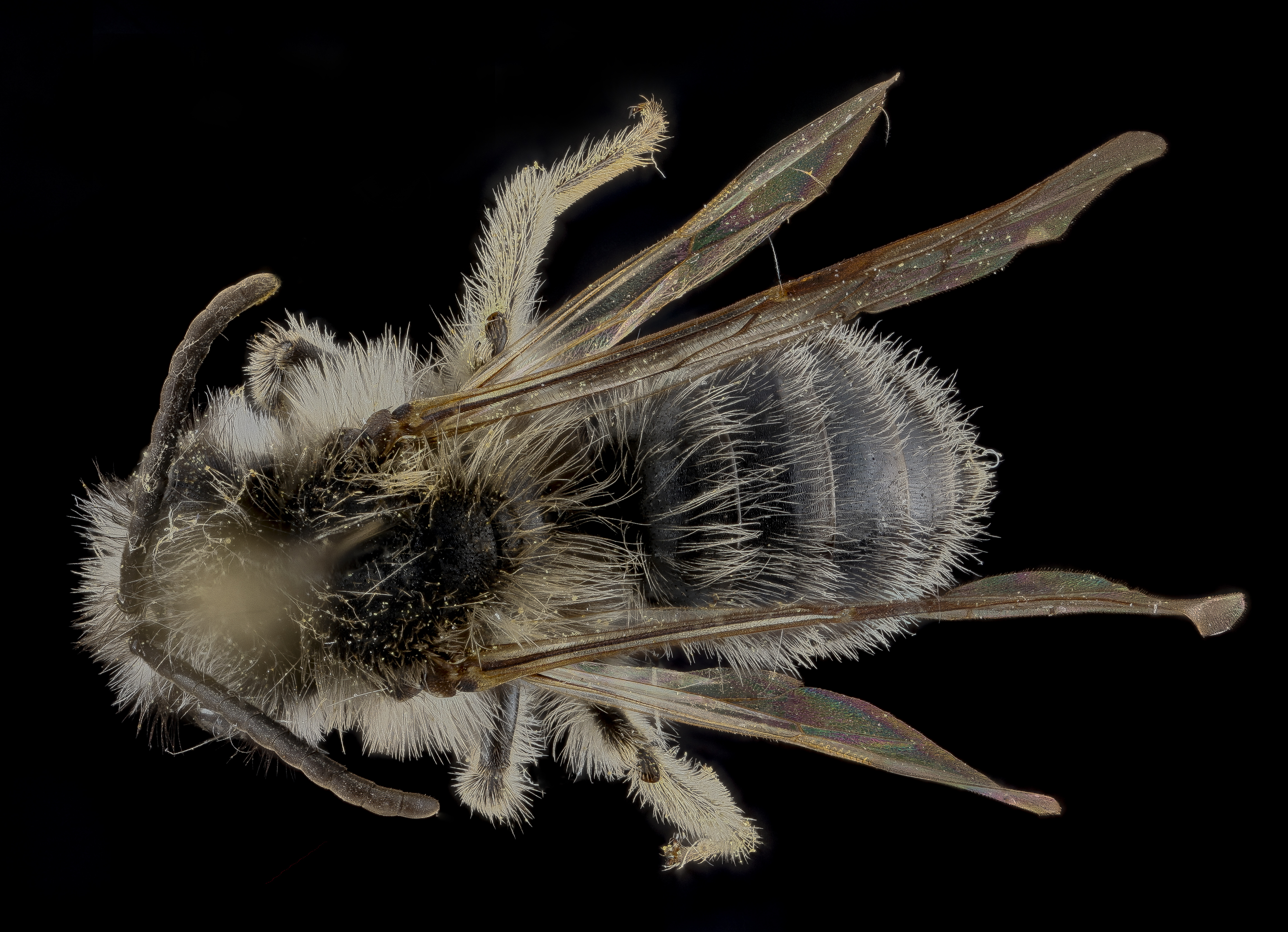

Scientific classification
- Domain: Eukaryota
- Kingdom: Animalia
- Phylum: Arthropoda
- Class: Insecta
- Order: Hymenoptera
- Family: Andrenidae
- Genus: Andrena
- Species: A. frigida

Binomial name
- Andrena frigida Smith, 1853

= Andrena frigida =

Species of bee

The cold miner bee (Andrena frigida) is a species of miner bee in the family Andrenidae. Another common name for this species is the frigid miner. It is found in North America.
