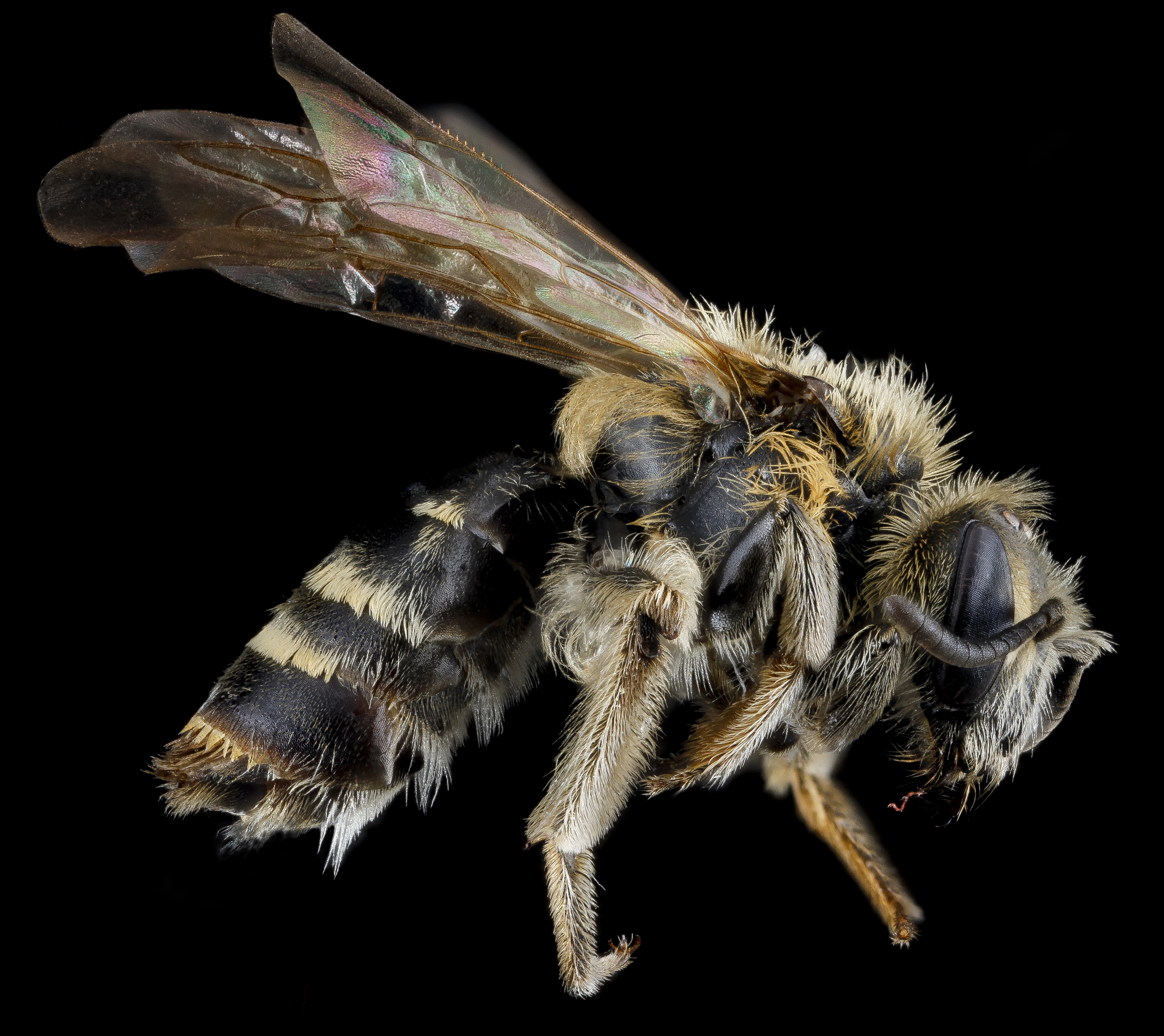

Scientific classification
- Domain: Eukaryota
- Kingdom: Animalia
- Phylum: Arthropoda
- Class: Insecta
- Order: Hymenoptera
- Family: Andrenidae
- Genus: Andrena
- Species: A. nasonii

Binomial name
- Andrena nasonii Robertson, 1895

= Andrena nasonii =

Species of bee

The bumped miner bee (Andrena nasonii) is a species of miner bee in the family Andrenidae. Another common name for this species is the Nason's andrena. It is found in Central America and North America. It is a generalist, collects pollen from many different plants.

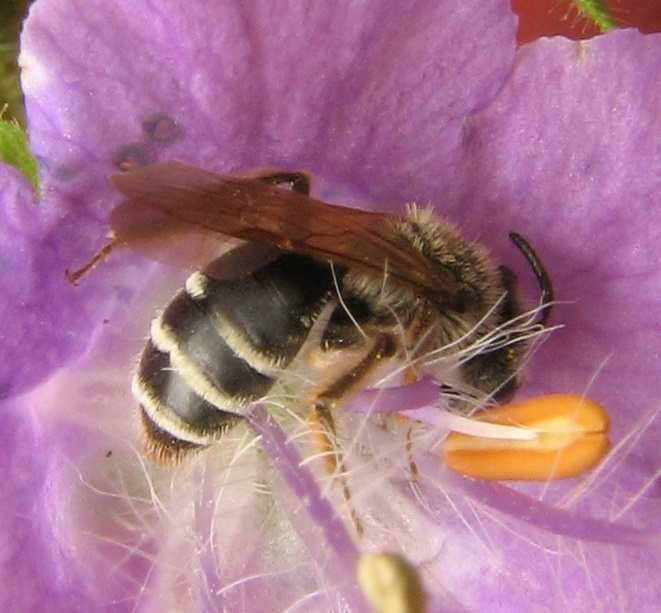
Female
