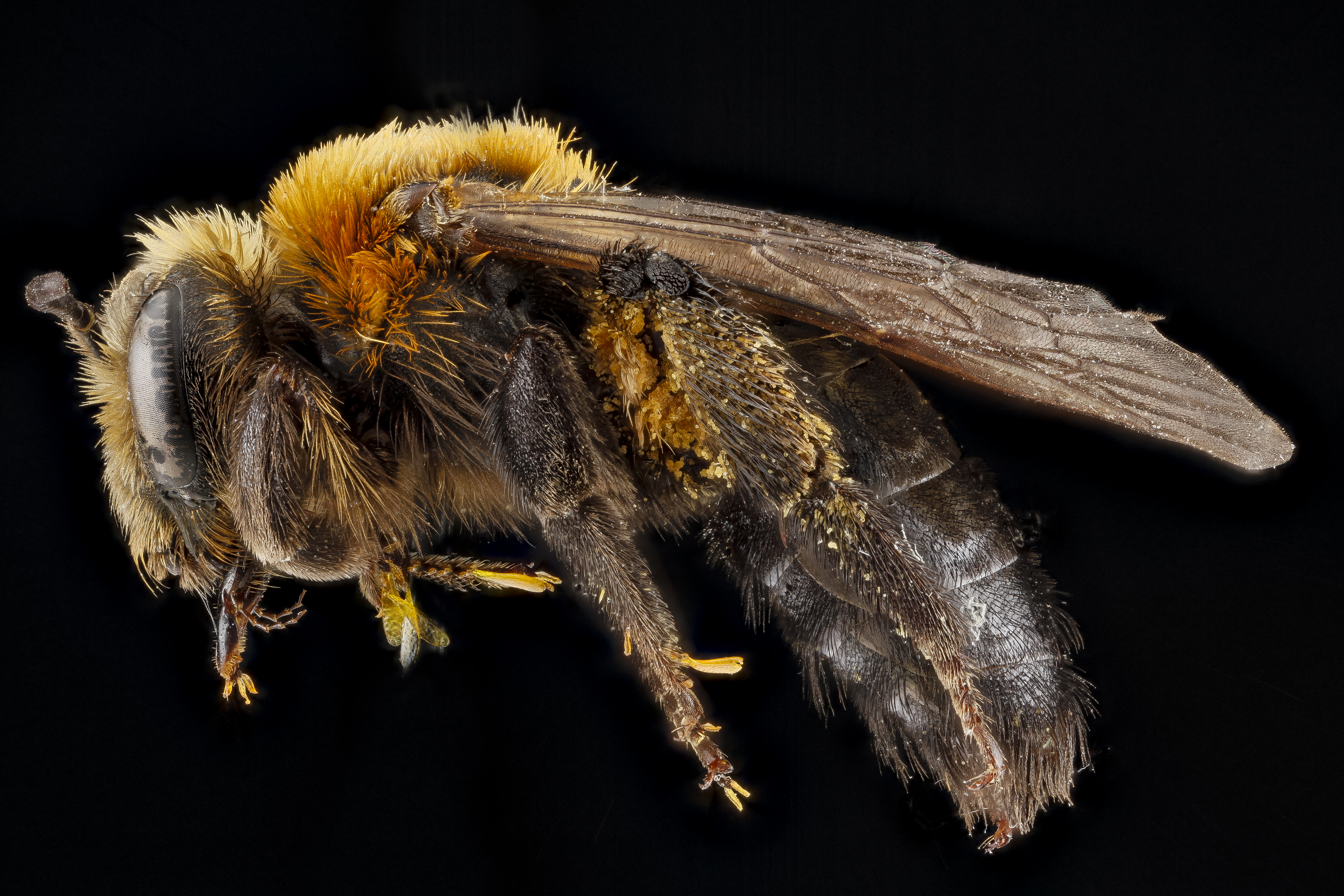

Scientific classification
- Kingdom: Animalia
- Phylum: Arthropoda
- Clade: Pancrustacea
- Class: Insecta
- Order: Hymenoptera
- Family: Andrenidae
- Genus: Andrena
- Species: A. lupinorum

Binomial name
- Andrena lupinorum Cockerell, 1906

= Andrena lupinorum =

Miner bee species in the family Andrenidae

The lupine miner bee (Andrena chlorogaster) is a species of miner bee in the family Andrenidae. It is found in North America.
