= Andrena subaustralis =

Scientific classification
- Kingdom: Animalia
- Phylum: Arthropoda
- Class: Insecta
- Order: Hymenoptera
- Family: Andrenidae
- Genus: Andrena
- Species: A. subaustralis

Binomial name
- Andrena subaustralis Cockerell, 1898

Miner bee species in the family Andrenidae

The southern miner bee (Andrena subaustralis) is a species of miner bee in the family Andrenidae. It is found in North America.
