= Andrena argemonis =

Scientific classification
- Kingdom: Animalia
- Phylum: Arthropoda
- Class: Insecta
- Order: Hymenoptera
- Family: Andrenidae
- Genus: Andrena
- Species: A. argemonis

Binomial name
- Andrena argemonis Cockerell, 1896

Species of bee

Andrena argemonis, the prickly-poppy andrena, is a species of mining bee in the family Andrenidae. It is found in Central America and North America.
