= Andrena erythrogaster =

Scientific classification
- Domain: Eukaryota
- Kingdom: Animalia
- Phylum: Arthropoda
- Class: Insecta
- Order: Hymenoptera
- Family: Andrenidae
- Genus: Andrena
- Species: A. erythrogaster

Binomial name
- Andrena erythrogaster (Ashmead, 1890)

Species of bee

Andrena erythrogaster, the red-bellied miner bee, is a species of miner bee native to North America.
