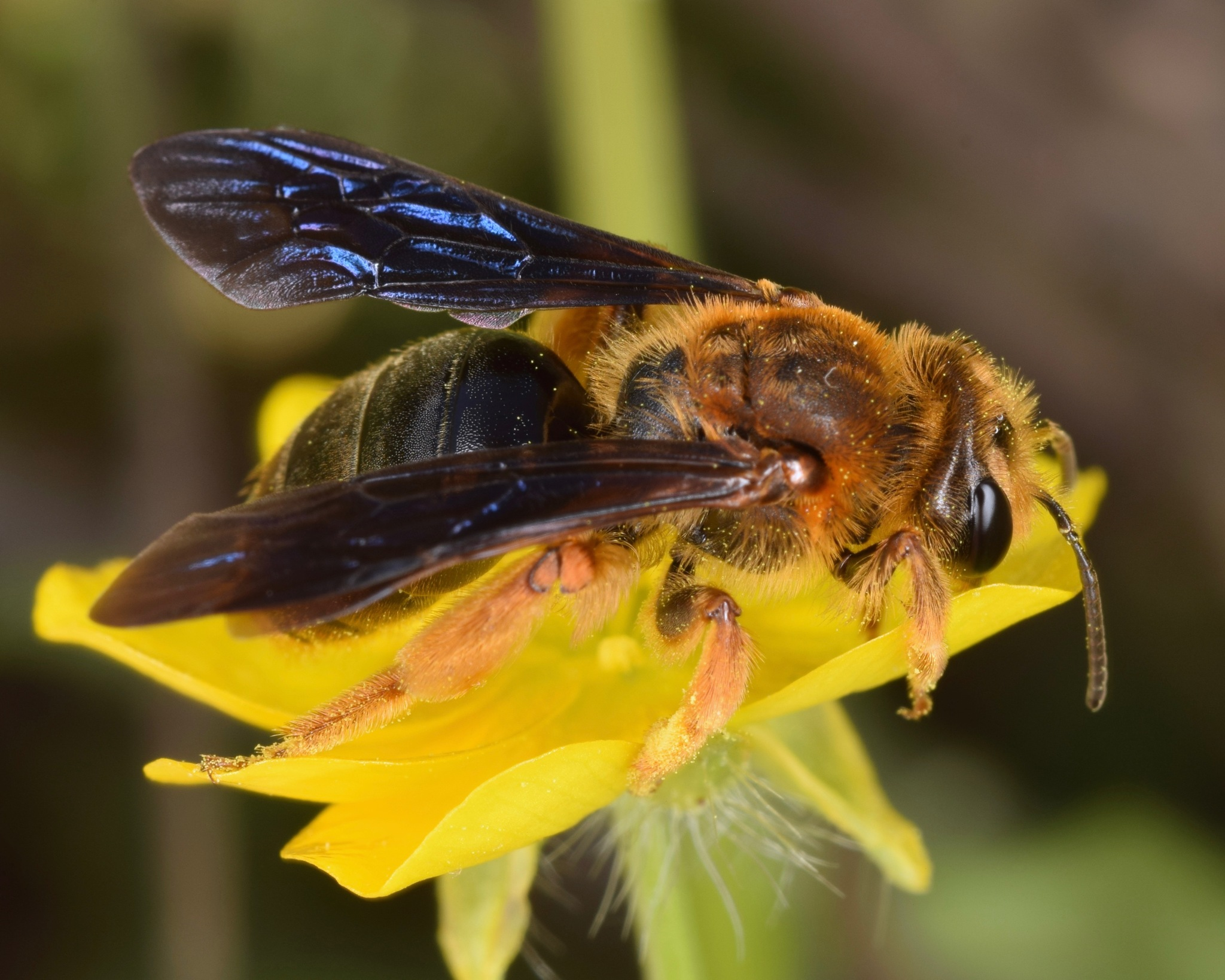

Scientific classification
- Kingdom: Animalia
- Phylum: Arthropoda
- Class: Insecta
- Order: Hymenoptera
- Family: Andrenidae
- Genus: Andrena
- Species: A. obscuripennis

Binomial name
- Andrena obscuripennis Smith, 1853

= Andrena obscuripennis =

Species of bee

Andrena obscuripennis is a species of mining bee in the family Andrenidae. It is found in North America.

The currently known distribution of this species is Florida, Georgia, Mississippi, North Carolina, and Ontario, Canada. Mitchell's books on the bees of the Eastern United States originally included New Jersey and Louisiana as part of the distribution, but those records could not be validated. Additional records from coastal areas of South Carolina, Virginia and Maryland are available in online repositories.

Unfortunately, little is known about the biology or life history of this species, though in a study conducted in Georgia on the flight heights of bees, one individual was collected within 0.5 m of the ground while none were collected in the canopy.
