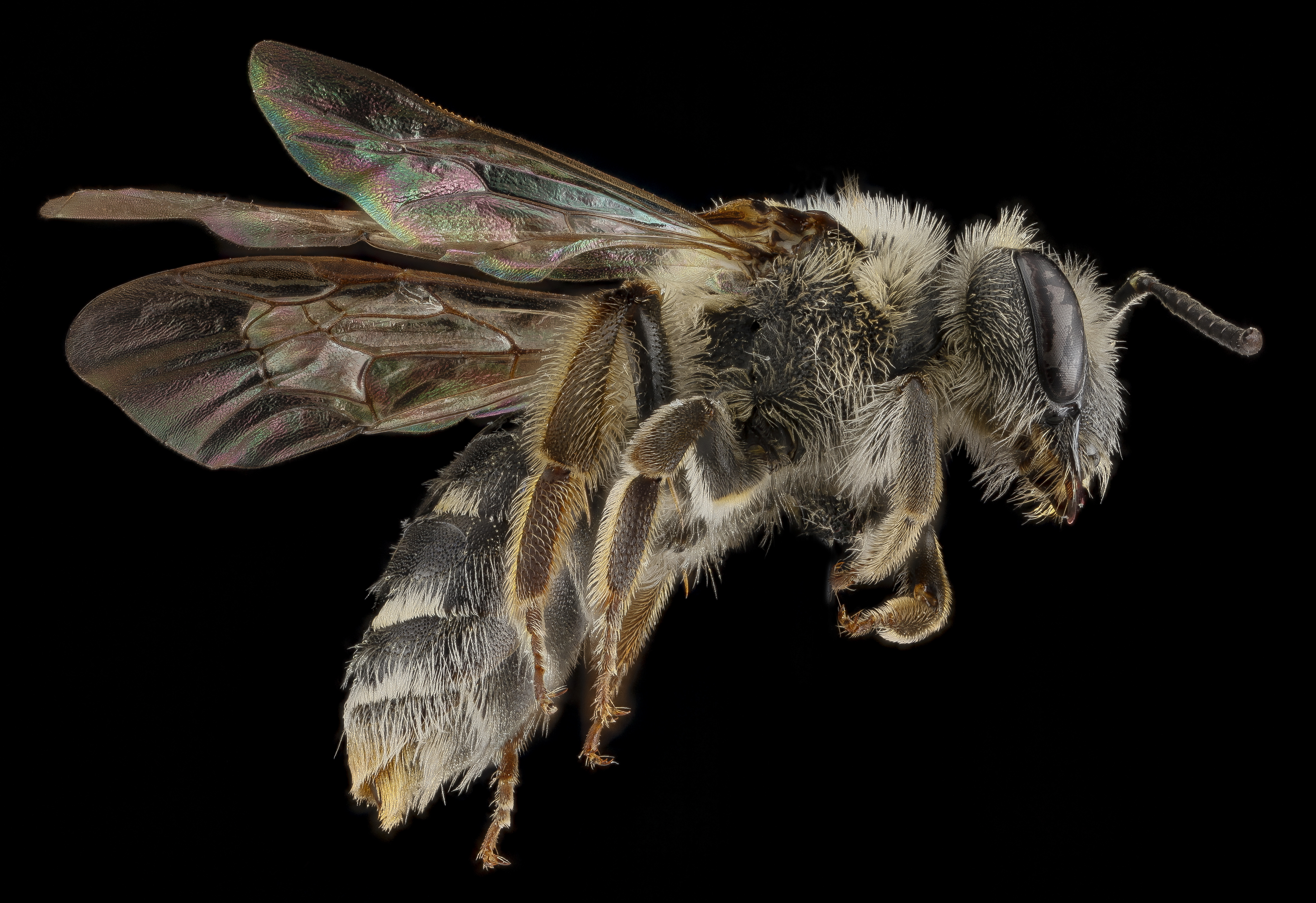

Scientific classification
- Domain: Eukaryota
- Kingdom: Animalia
- Phylum: Arthropoda
- Class: Insecta
- Order: Hymenoptera
- Family: Andrenidae
- Genus: Andrena
- Species: A. hippotes

Binomial name
- Andrena hippotes Robertson, 1895

= Andrena hippotes =

Species of bee

Andrena hippotes, or Hippotes's miner bee, is a species of miner bee in the family Andrenidae. It is found in North America.
