= Andrena sola =

Scientific classification
- Domain: Eukaryota
- Kingdom: Animalia
- Phylum: Arthropoda
- Class: Insecta
- Order: Hymenoptera
- Family: Andrenidae
- Genus: Andrena
- Species: A. sola

Binomial name
- Andrena sola Viereck, 1916

Species of bee

The lonely miner bee (Andrena sola) is a species of miner bee in the family Andrenidae. It is found in Central America and North America.
