= Andrena cleodora =

Scientific classification
- Domain: Eukaryota
- Kingdom: Animalia
- Phylum: Arthropoda
- Class: Insecta
- Order: Hymenoptera
- Family: Andrenidae
- Genus: Andrena
- Species: A. cleodora

Binomial name
- Andrena cleodora (Viereck, 1904)

Species of insect

The shiny-blue sculptured miner bee (Andrena cleodora) is a species of miner bee in the family Andrenidae. It is found in North America.

== Subspecies ==
These two subspecies belong to the species Andrena cleodora:

- Andrena cleodora cleodora (Viereck, 1904)
- Andrena cleodora melanodora Cockerell, 1932
