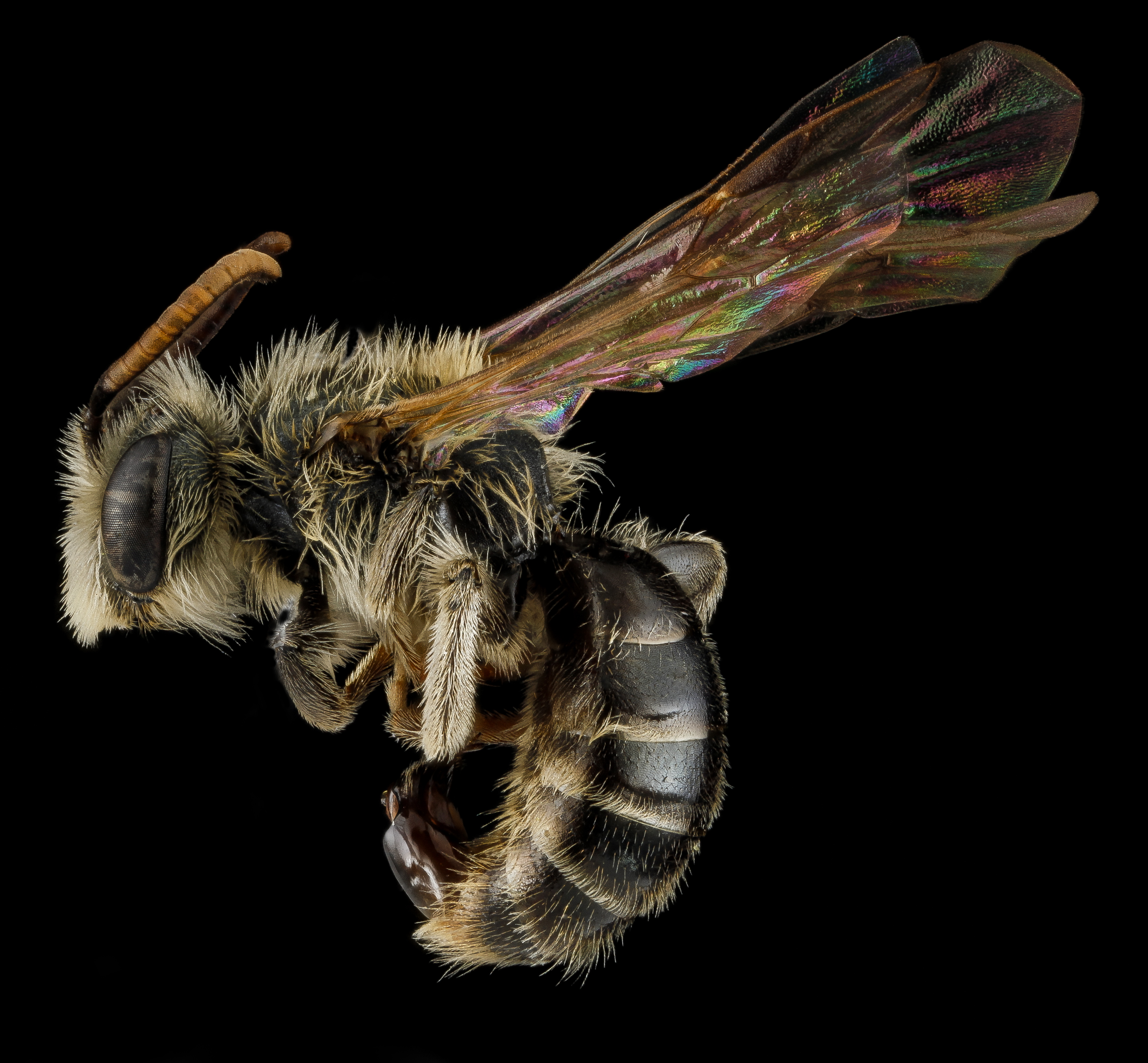
- Andrena salictaria

Scientific classification
- Domain: Eukaryota
- Kingdom: Animalia
- Phylum: Arthropoda
- Class: Insecta
- Order: Hymenoptera
- Family: Andrenidae
- Genus: Andrena
- Species: A. salictaria

Binomial name
- Andrena salictaria Robertson, 1905

= Andrena salictaria =

Miner bee species in the family Andrenidae

The small willow miner bee (Andrena salictaria) is a species of miner bee in the family Andrenidae. It is found in North America.
