= Andrena jessicae =

Scientific classification
- Kingdom: Animalia
- Phylum: Arthropoda
- Class: Insecta
- Order: Hymenoptera
- Family: Andrenidae
- Genus: Andrena
- Species: A. jessicae

Binomial name
- Andrena jessicae Cockerell, 1896

Species of bee

Andrena jessicae is a species of mining bee in the family Andrenidae. It is found in Central America and North America. This species is named after Jessie E. Casad, a co-author of Cockerell.
