= Andrena rugulosa =

Scientific classification
- Domain: Eukaryota
- Kingdom: Animalia
- Phylum: Arthropoda
- Class: Insecta
- Order: Hymenoptera
- Family: Andrenidae
- Genus: Andrena
- Species: A. rugulosa

Binomial name
- Andrena rugulosa Stoeckhert, 1935

Species of bee

Andrena rugulosa is a species of insect belonging to the family Andrenidae.

It is native to Central Europe.
