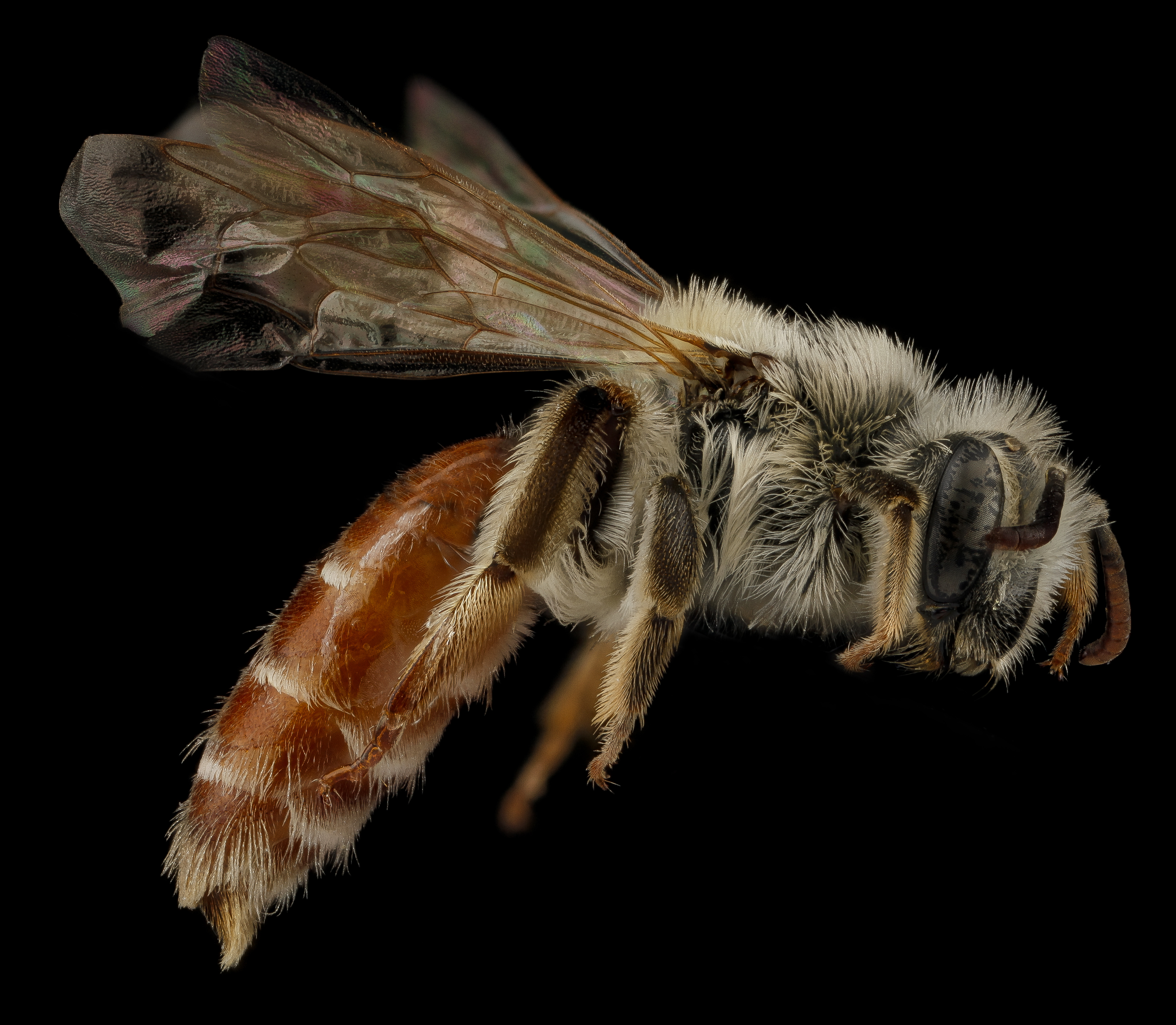

Scientific classification
- Domain: Eukaryota
- Kingdom: Animalia
- Phylum: Arthropoda
- Class: Insecta
- Order: Hymenoptera
- Family: Andrenidae
- Genus: Andrena
- Species: A. andrenoides

Binomial name
- Andrena andrenoides Cresson, 1878

= Andrena andrenoides =

Miner bee species in the family Andrenidae

The colourful willow miner bee (Andrena andrenoides) is a species of miner bee in the family Andrenidae. It is found in North America.
