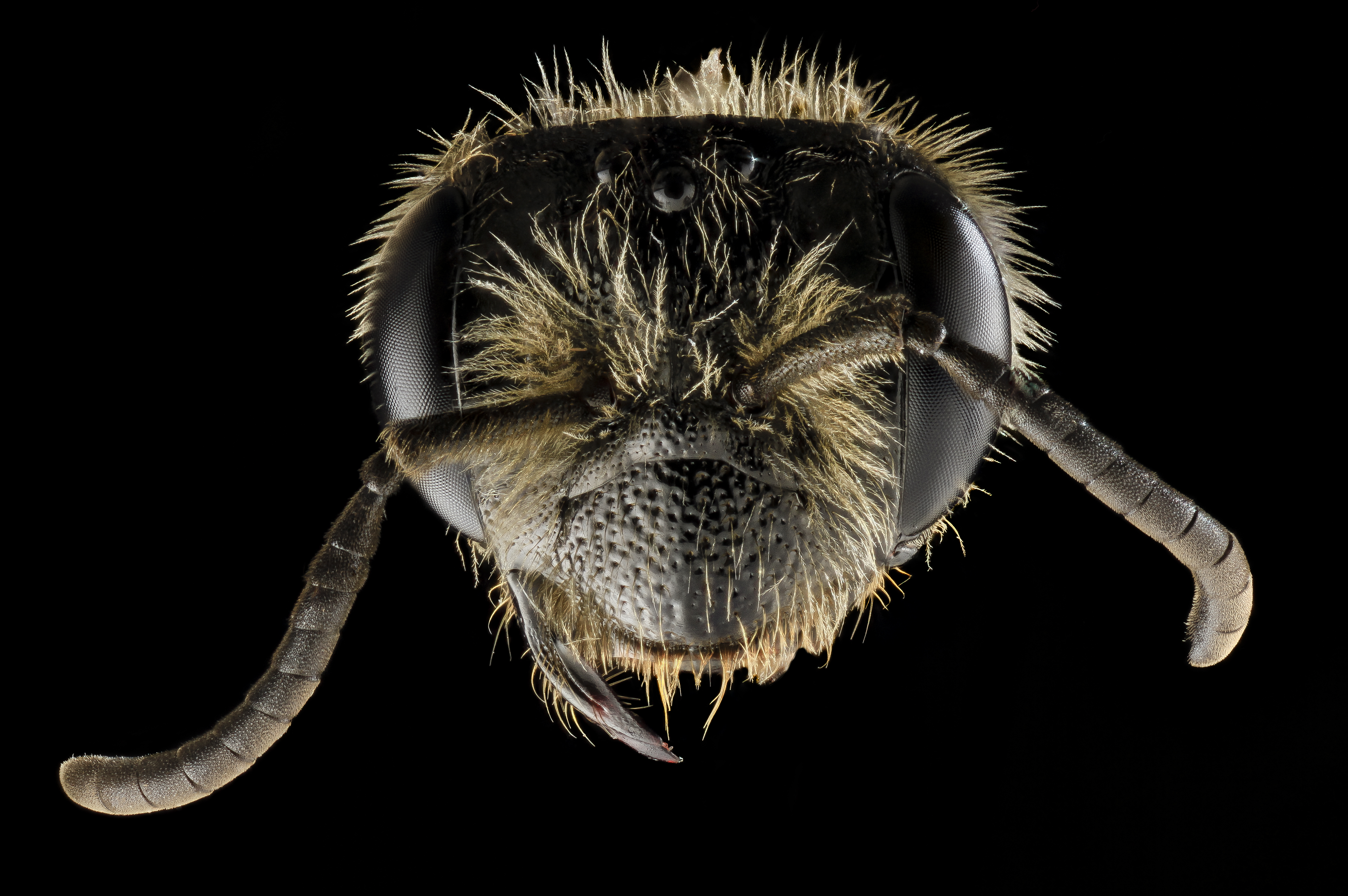
- This specimen was shot upside down and then inverted in photoshop to see what it would look like in terms of lighting

Scientific classification
- Domain: Eukaryota
- Kingdom: Animalia
- Phylum: Arthropoda
- Class: Insecta
- Order: Hymenoptera
- Family: Andrenidae
- Genus: Andrena
- Species: A. rugosa

Binomial name
- Andrena rugosa Robertson, 1891

= Andrena rugosa =

Species of bee

Andrena rugosa, the wrinkled miner bee, is a species of miner bee in the family Andrenidae. Another common name for this species is the rugose andrena. It is found in North America.
