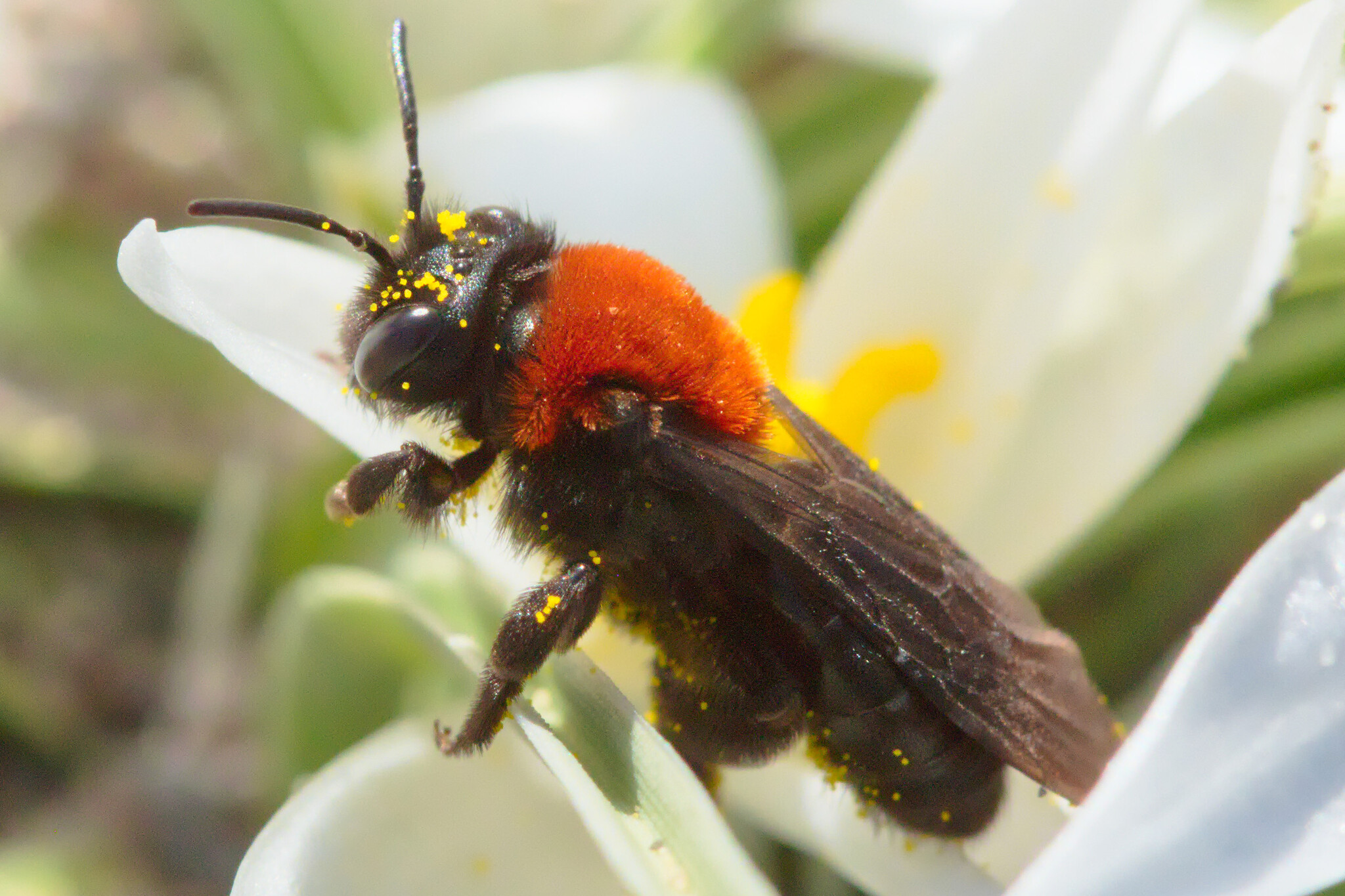

Scientific classification
- Kingdom: Animalia
- Phylum: Arthropoda
- Class: Insecta
- Order: Hymenoptera
- Family: Andrenidae
- Genus: Andrena
- Species: A. amphibola

Binomial name
- Andrena amphibola Viereck, 1904

= Andrena amphibola =

Miner bee species in the family Andrenidae

The amphibious miner bee (Andrena amphibola) is a species of miner bee in the family Andrenidae. It is found in North America.
