= Andrena nigrocaerulea =

Scientific classification
- Kingdom: Animalia
- Phylum: Arthropoda
- Class: Insecta
- Order: Hymenoptera
- Family: Andrenidae
- Genus: Andrena
- Species: A. nigrocaerulea

Binomial name
- Andrena nigrocaerulea Cockerell, 1897

Species of bee

The black and blue miner bee (Andrena nigrocaerulea) is a species of miner bee in the family Andrenidae. Another common name for this species is the blue-and-black andrena. It is found in North America.
