= Andrena lawrencei =

Scientific classification
- Kingdom: Animalia
- Phylum: Arthropoda
- Class: Insecta
- Order: Hymenoptera
- Family: Andrenidae
- Genus: Andrena
- Species: A. lawrencei

Binomial name
- Andrena lawrencei Viereck and Cockerell, 1914

Miner bee species in the family Andrenidae

The Lawrence's miner bee (Andrena lawrencei) is a species of miner bee in the family Andrenidae. It is found in North America.
