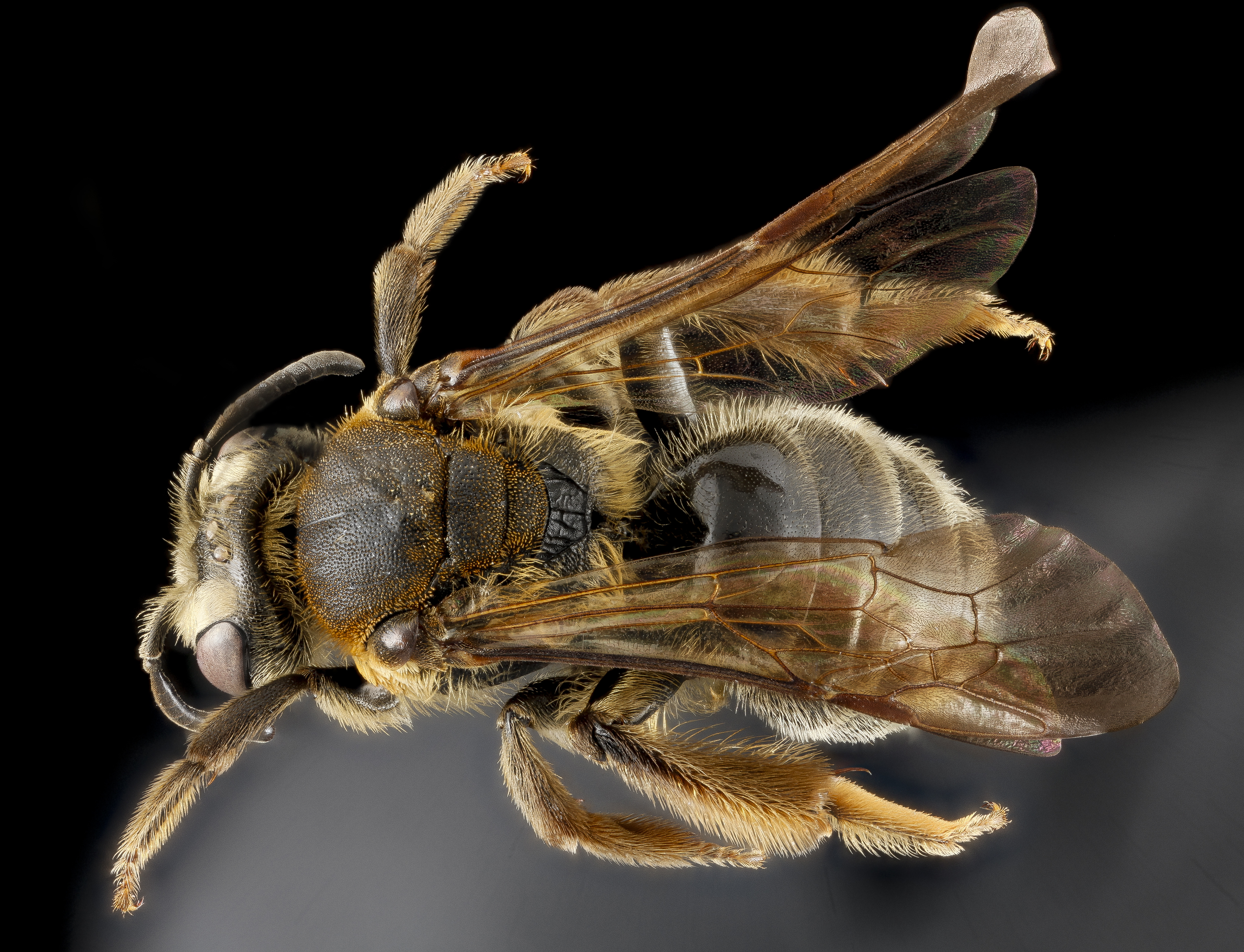

Scientific classification
- Domain: Eukaryota
- Kingdom: Animalia
- Phylum: Arthropoda
- Class: Insecta
- Order: Hymenoptera
- Family: Andrenidae
- Genus: Andrena
- Species: A. alleghaniensis

Binomial name
- Andrena alleghaniensis Viereck, 1907

= Andrena alleghaniensis =

Species of bee

The Appalachian miner bee (Andrena alleghaniensis) is a species of miner bee in the family Andrenidae. Another common name for this species is Alleghany andrena. It is found in North America. Its nests typically only have one or two cells. Adults overwinter in soil.
