= Andrena apacheorum =

Scientific classification
- Kingdom: Animalia
- Phylum: Arthropoda
- Class: Insecta
- Order: Hymenoptera
- Family: Andrenidae
- Genus: Andrena
- Species: A. apacheorum

Binomial name
- Andrena apacheorum Cockerell, 1897

Species of bee

Andrena apacheorum is a species of mining bee in the family Andrenidae. The species resides in Central America and North America.
