= Andrena pertristis =

Scientific classification
- Kingdom: Animalia
- Phylum: Arthropoda
- Class: Insecta
- Order: Hymenoptera
- Family: Andrenidae
- Genus: Andrena
- Species: A. pertristis

Binomial name
- Andrena pertristis Cockerell, 1905

Species of bee

Andrena pertristis, also known as the sad miner bee, is a species of miner bee in the family Andrenidae. It is found in North America.

== Subspecies ==
These two subspecies belong to the species Andrena pertristis:

- Andrena pertristis carliniformis Viereck & Cockerell, 1914
- Andrena pertristis pertristis Cockerell, 1905 (black mournful miner)
