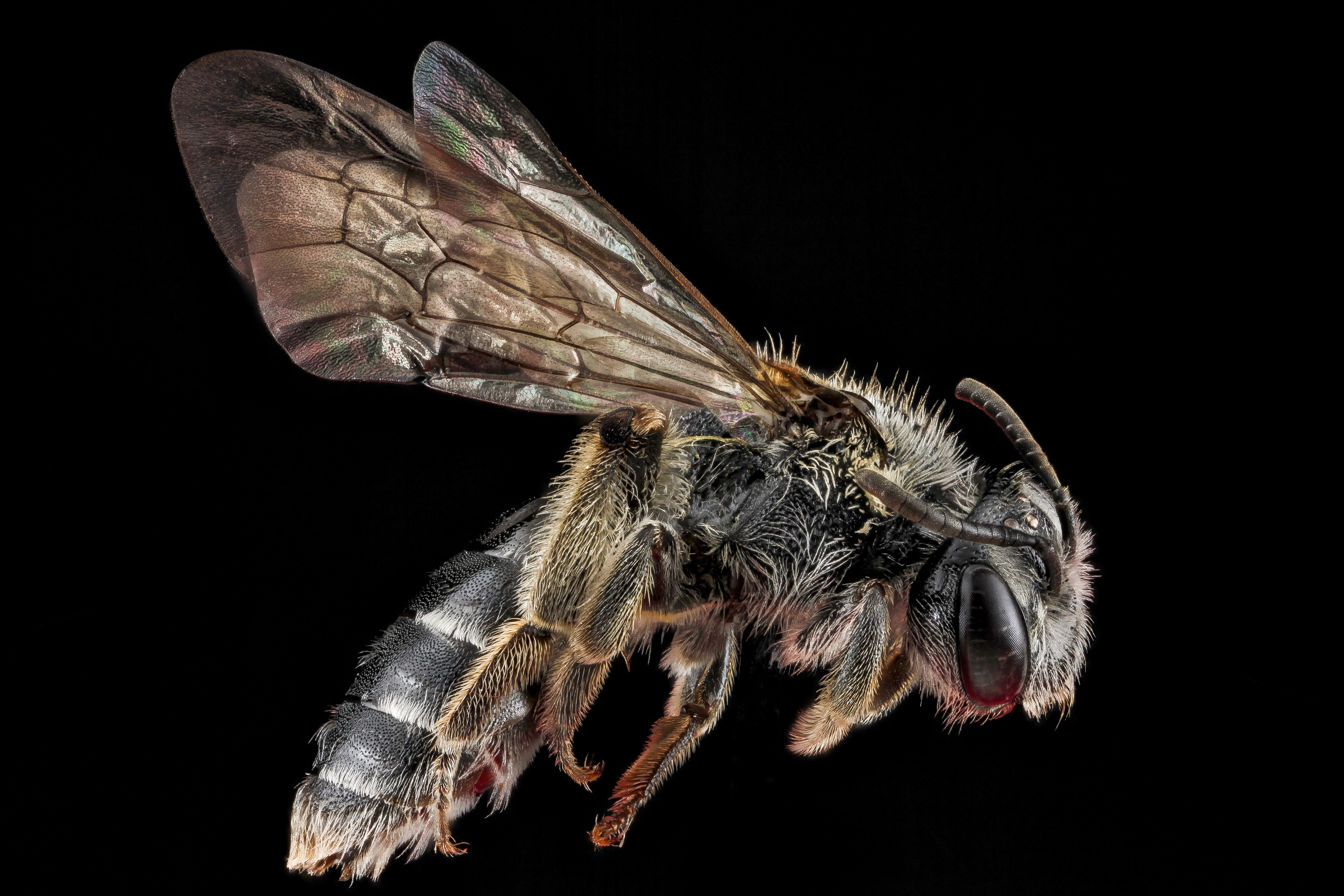

Scientific classification
- Domain: Eukaryota
- Kingdom: Animalia
- Phylum: Arthropoda
- Class: Insecta
- Order: Hymenoptera
- Family: Andrenidae
- Genus: Andrena
- Species: A. virginiana

Binomial name
- Andrena virginiana Mitchell, 1960

= Andrena virginiana =

Species of bee

The Virginia miner bee (Andrena virginiana), also known as Virginia andrena, is a species of miner bee in the family Andrenidae. It is found in North America.
