= Andrena edwardsi =

Scientific classification
- Domain: Eukaryota
- Kingdom: Animalia
- Phylum: Arthropoda
- Class: Insecta
- Order: Hymenoptera
- Family: Andrenidae
- Genus: Andrena
- Species: A. edwardsi

Binomial name
- Andrena edwardsi Viereck, 1916

Miner bee species in the family Andrenidae

The Edwards's miner bee (Andrena edwardsi) is a species of miner bee in the family Andrenidae. It is found in North America.
