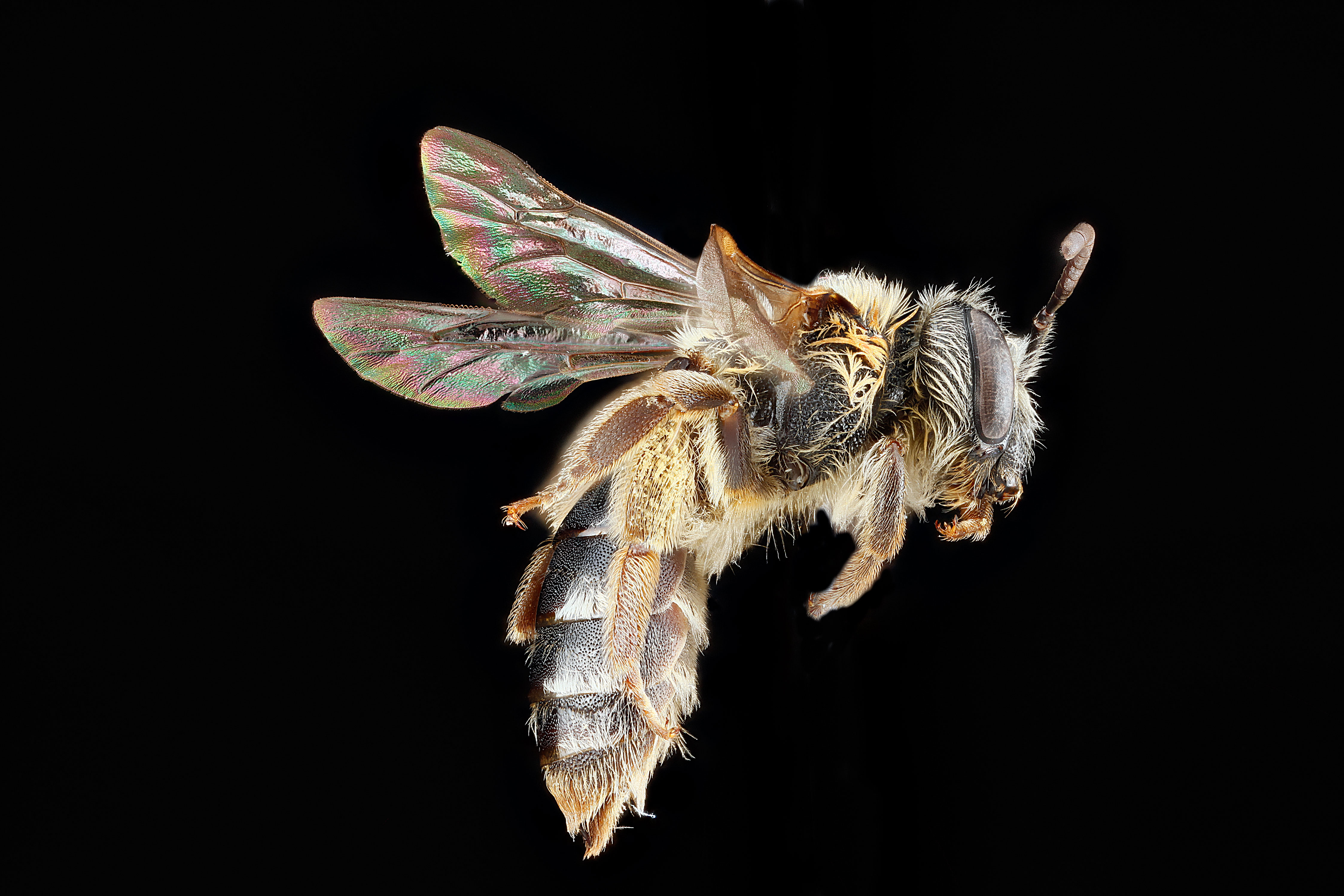

Scientific classification
- Domain: Eukaryota
- Kingdom: Animalia
- Phylum: Arthropoda
- Class: Insecta
- Order: Hymenoptera
- Family: Andrenidae
- Genus: Andrena
- Species: A. ceanothi

Binomial name
- Andrena ceanothi Viereck, 1917

= Andrena ceanothi =

Miner bee species in the family Andrenidae

The ceanothus miner bee (Andrena ceanothi) is a species of miner bee in the family Andrenidae. It is found in North America.
