= Andrena fuscicauda =

Scientific classification
- Domain: Eukaryota
- Kingdom: Animalia
- Phylum: Arthropoda
- Class: Insecta
- Order: Hymenoptera
- Family: Andrenidae
- Genus: Andrena
- Species: A. fuscicauda

Binomial name
- Andrena fuscicauda (Viereck, 1904)

Species of bee

The brown-tailed miner bee (Andrena fuscicauda) is a species of miner bee in the family Andrenidae. Another common name for this species the dark-tailed andrena. It is found in North America.
