= Andrena livida =

Scientific classification
- Domain: Eukaryota
- Kingdom: Animalia
- Phylum: Arthropoda
- Class: Insecta
- Order: Hymenoptera
- Family: Andrenidae
- Genus: Andrena
- Species: A. livida

Binomial name
- Andrena livida LaBerge, 1977

Species of bee

Andrena livida is a species of mining bee in the family Andrenidae. It is found in Central America and North America.
