= Andrena merriami =

Scientific classification
- Domain: Eukaryota
- Kingdom: Animalia
- Phylum: Arthropoda
- Class: Insecta
- Order: Hymenoptera
- Family: Andrenidae
- Genus: Andrena
- Species: A. merriami

Binomial name
- Andrena merriami Cockerell, 1901

Miner bee species in the family Andrenidae

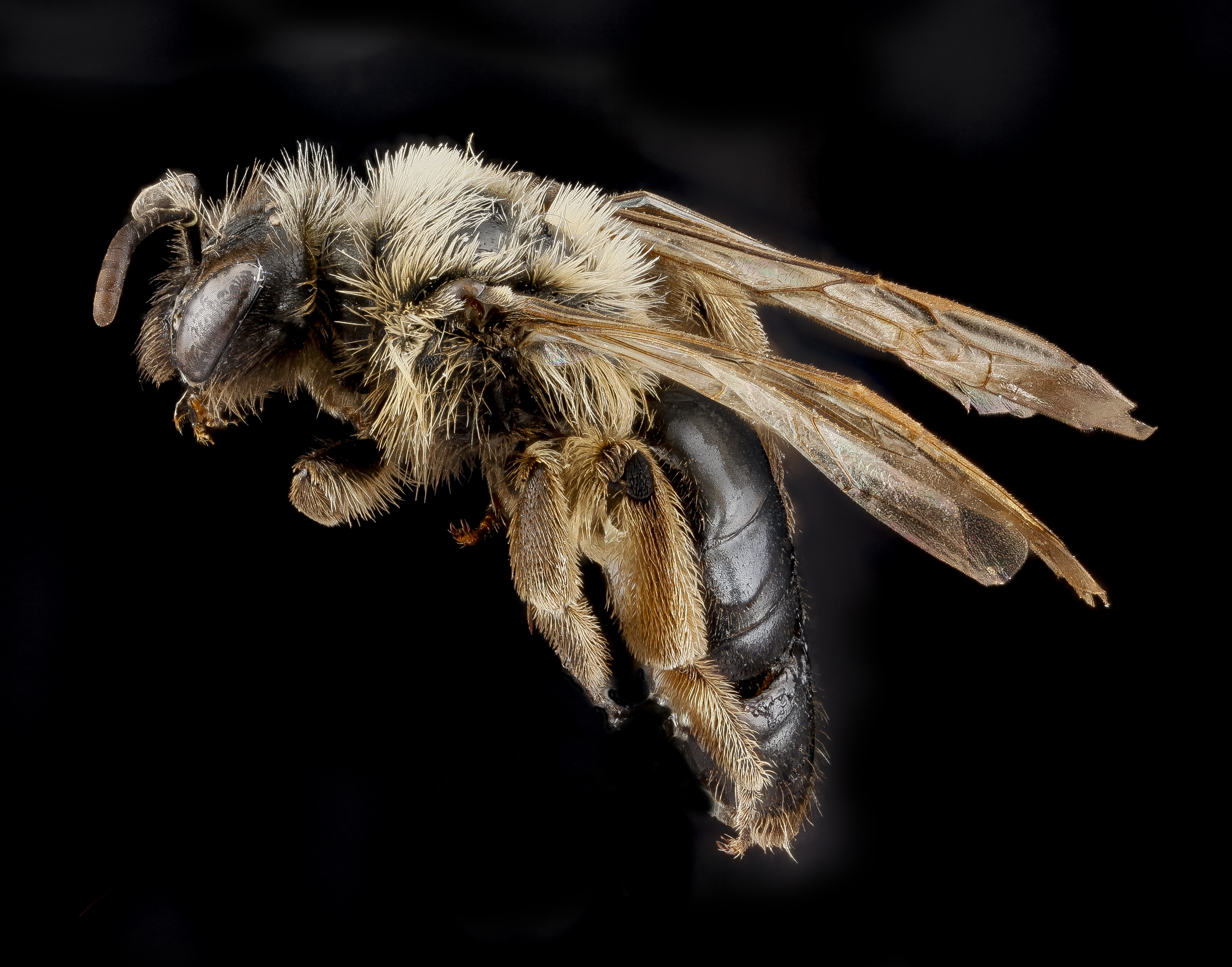
Andrena merriami

The Merriam's miner bee (Andrena merriami) is a species of miner bee in the family Andrenidae. It is found in North America.
