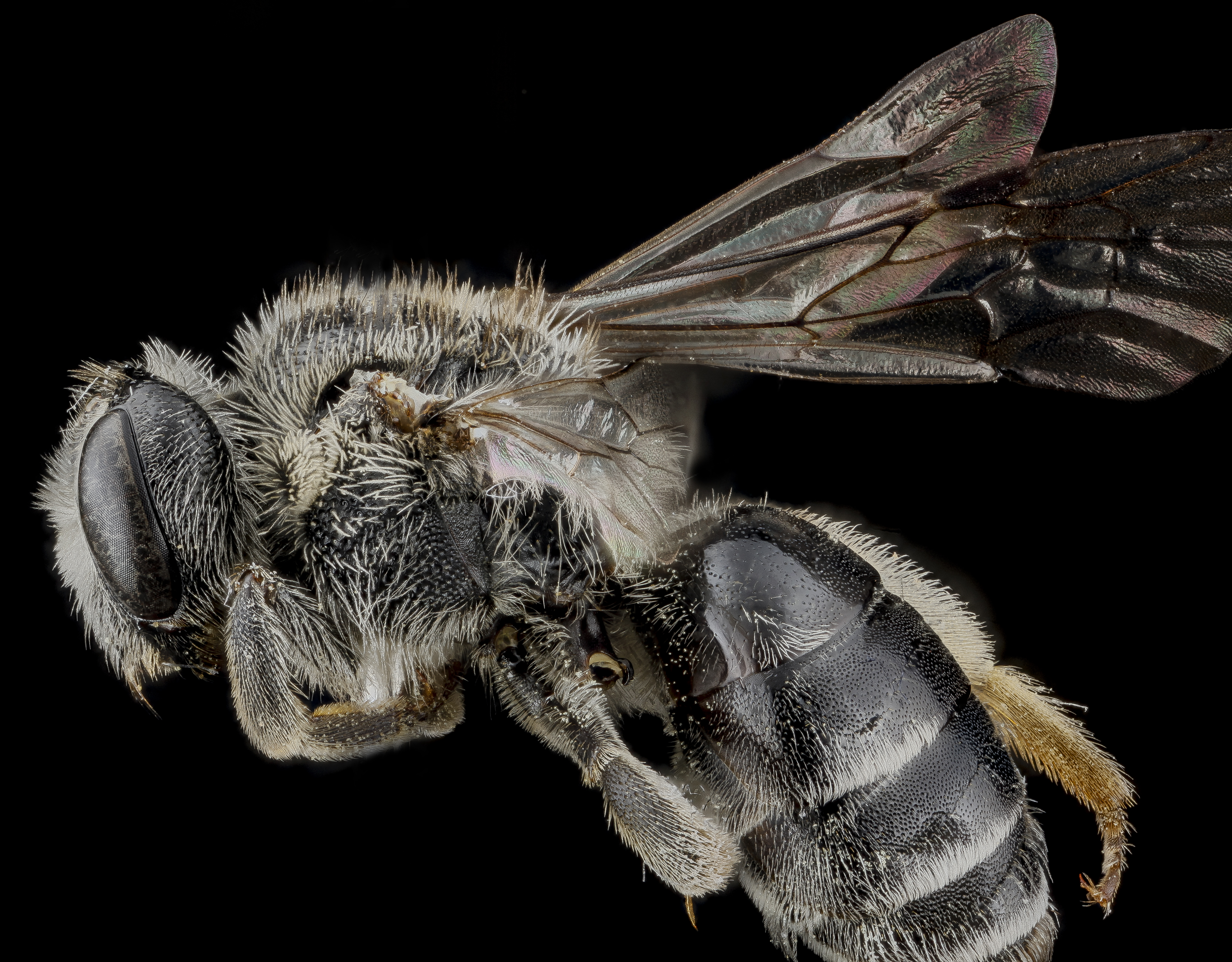
- Andrena miranda

Scientific classification
- Domain: Eukaryota
- Kingdom: Animalia
- Phylum: Arthropoda
- Class: Insecta
- Order: Hymenoptera
- Family: Andrenidae
- Genus: Andrena
- Species: A. miranda

Binomial name
- Andrena miranda Smith, 1879

= Andrena miranda =

Miner bee species in the family Andrenidae

The singular miner bee (Andrena miranda) is a species of miner bee in the family Andrenidae. It is found in Central America and North America.
