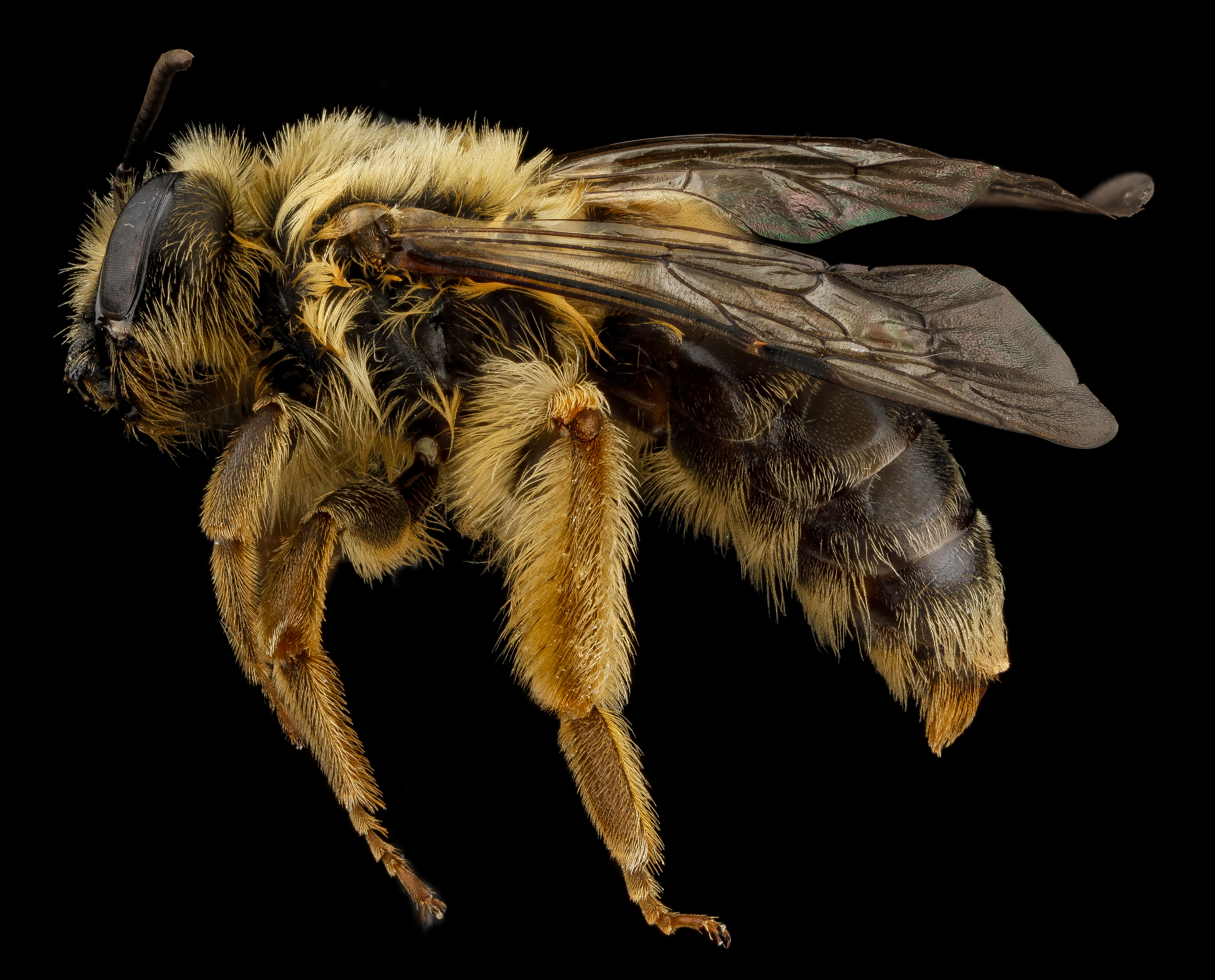

Scientific classification
- Domain: Eukaryota
- Kingdom: Animalia
- Phylum: Arthropoda
- Class: Insecta
- Order: Hymenoptera
- Family: Andrenidae
- Genus: Andrena
- Species: A. helianthi

Binomial name
- Andrena helianthi Robertson, 1891

= Andrena helianthi =

Species of bee

The sunflower miner bee (Andrena helianthi) is a species of miner bee in the family Andrenidae. Another common name for this species is the sunflower andrena. It is found in North America.
