= Andrena cyanophila =

Scientific classification
- Kingdom: Animalia
- Phylum: Arthropoda
- Class: Insecta
- Order: Hymenoptera
- Family: Andrenidae
- Genus: Andrena
- Species: A. cyanophila

Binomial name
- Andrena cyanophila Cockerell, 1906

Miner bee species in the family Andrenidae

The dimple-cheeked miner bee (Andrena cyanophila) is a species of miner bee in the family Andrenidae. It is found in North America.
