= Andrena sladeni =

Scientific classification
- Domain: Eukaryota
- Kingdom: Animalia
- Phylum: Arthropoda
- Class: Insecta
- Order: Hymenoptera
- Family: Andrenidae
- Genus: Andrena
- Species: A. sladeni

Binomial name
- Andrena sladeni Viereck, 1924

Miner bee species in the family Andrenidae

The Sladen's miner bee (Andrena sladeni) is a species of miner bee in the family Andrenidae. It is found in North America.
