= Andrena biscutellata =

Scientific classification
- Domain: Eukaryota
- Kingdom: Animalia
- Phylum: Arthropoda
- Class: Insecta
- Order: Hymenoptera
- Family: Andrenidae
- Genus: Andrena
- Species: A. biscutellata

Binomial name
- Andrena biscutellata Viereck, 1917

Species of bee

Andrena biscutellata is a species of mining bee in the family Andrenidae. It is found in North America.
