= Andrena levipes =

Scientific classification
- Domain: Eukaryota
- Kingdom: Animalia
- Phylum: Arthropoda
- Class: Insecta
- Order: Hymenoptera
- Family: Andrenidae
- Genus: Andrena
- Species: A. levipes

Binomial name
- Andrena levipes LaBerge, 1967

Species of bee

Andrena levipes is a species of mining bee in the family Andrenidae. It is found in North America.
