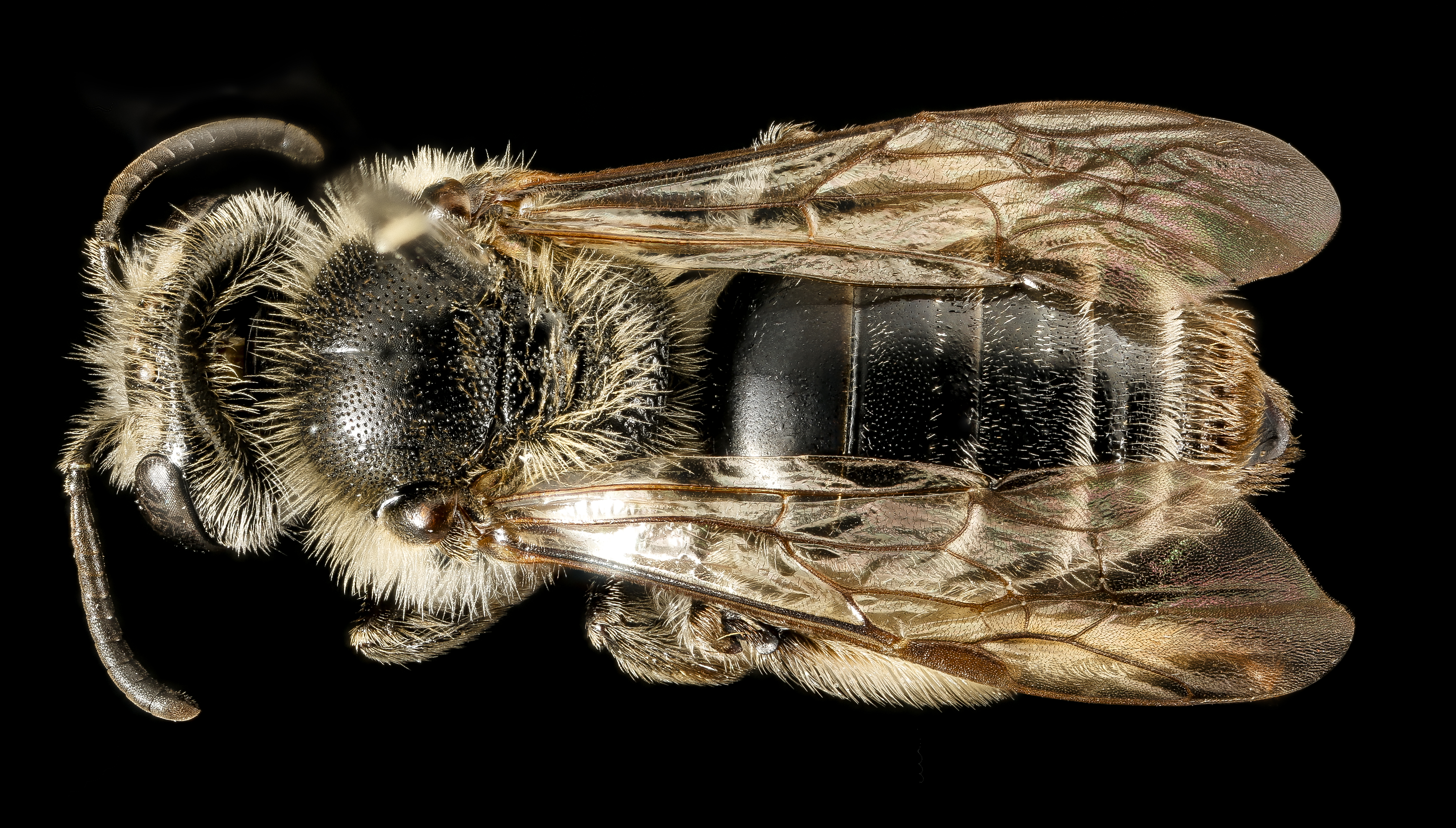

Scientific classification
- Domain: Eukaryota
- Kingdom: Animalia
- Phylum: Arthropoda
- Class: Insecta
- Order: Hymenoptera
- Family: Andrenidae
- Genus: Andrena
- Species: A. morrisonella

Binomial name
- Andrena morrisonella Viereck, 1917

= Andrena morrisonella =

Miner bee species in the family Andrenidae

Andrena morrisonella, the Morrison's miner bee, is a species of miner bee in the family Andrenidae. It is found in North America.
