= Andrena piperi =

Scientific classification
- Domain: Eukaryota
- Kingdom: Animalia
- Phylum: Arthropoda
- Class: Insecta
- Order: Hymenoptera
- Family: Andrenidae
- Genus: Andrena
- Species: A. piperi

Binomial name
- Andrena piperi Viereck, 1904

Species of bee

The Piper's miner bee (Andrena piperi) is a species of miner bee in the family Andrenidae. It is found in Central America and North America.
