= Andrena runcinatae =

Scientific classification
- Domain: Eukaryota
- Kingdom: Animalia
- Phylum: Arthropoda
- Class: Insecta
- Order: Hymenoptera
- Family: Andrenidae
- Genus: Andrena
- Species: A. runcinatae

Binomial name
- Andrena runcinatae Cockerell, 1906

Miner bee species in the family Andrenidae

The planed miner bee (Andrena runcinatae) is a species of miner bee in the family Andrenidae. It is found in North America.
