= Andrena gibberis =

Scientific classification
- Domain: Eukaryota
- Kingdom: Animalia
- Phylum: Arthropoda
- Class: Insecta
- Order: Hymenoptera
- Family: Andrenidae
- Genus: Andrena
- Species: A. gibberis

Binomial name
- Andrena gibberis Viereck, 1924

Miner bee species in the family Andrenidae

The gibbous miner bee (Andrena gibberis) is a species of miner bee in the family Andrenidae. It is a summer bee found in North America. Its black and yellow body lead to it often being mistaken for a bumblebee.
