= Andrena columbiana =

Scientific classification
- Domain: Eukaryota
- Kingdom: Animalia
- Phylum: Arthropoda
- Class: Insecta
- Order: Hymenoptera
- Family: Andrenidae
- Genus: Andrena
- Species: A. columbiana

Binomial name
- Andrena columbiana Viereck, 1917

Miner bee species in the family Andrenidae

The British Columbia miner bee (Andrena columbiana) is a species of miner bee in the family Andrenidae. It is found in North America.
