= Andrena melanochroa =

Scientific classification
- Kingdom: Animalia
- Phylum: Arthropoda
- Class: Insecta
- Order: Hymenoptera
- Family: Andrenidae
- Genus: Andrena
- Species: A. melanochroa

Binomial name
- Andrena melanochroa Cockerell, 1898

Miner bee species in the family Andrenidae

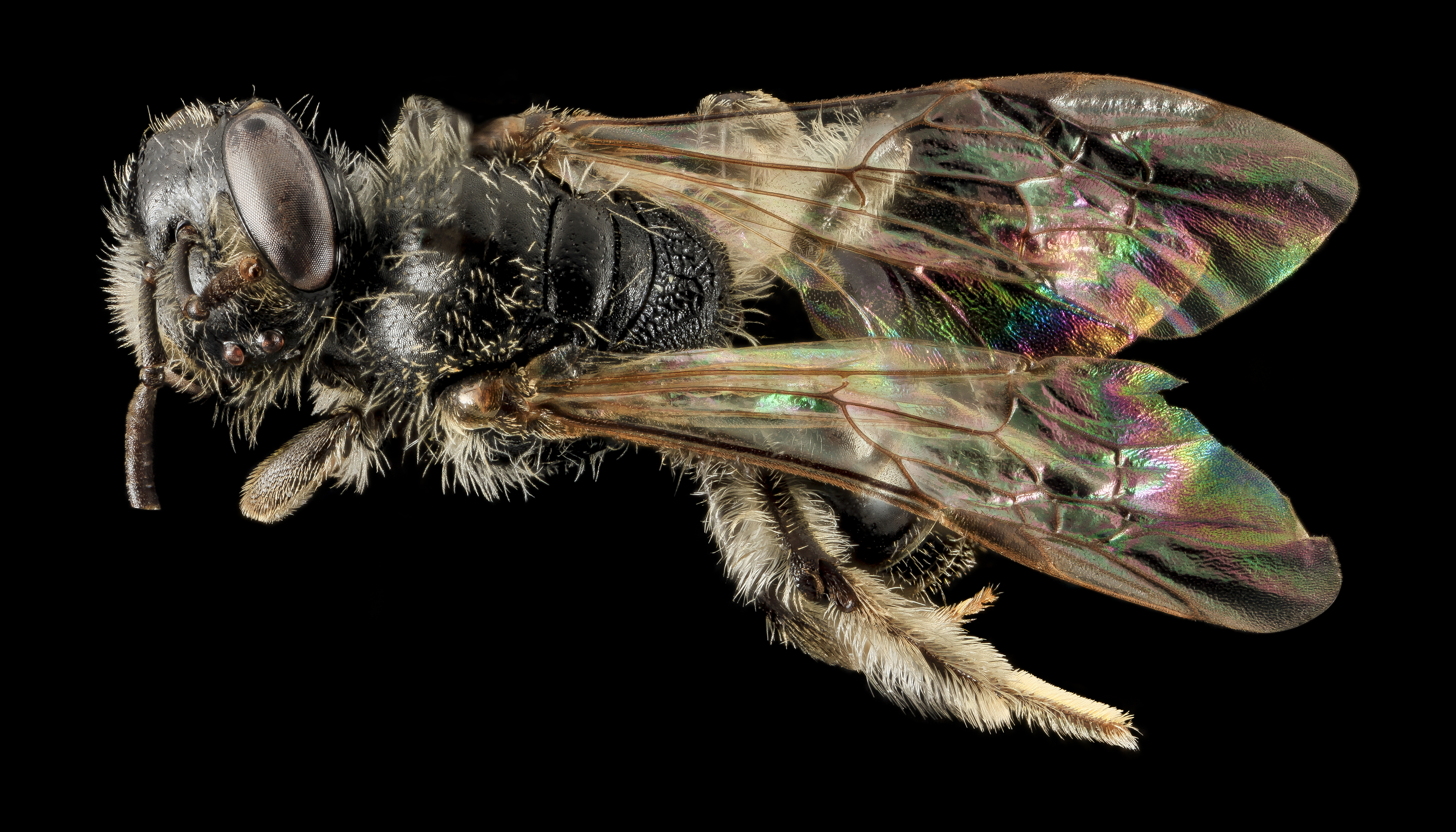
Andrena melanochroa

The rose miner bee (Andrena melanochroa) is a species of miner bee in the family Andrenidae. It is found in North America.
