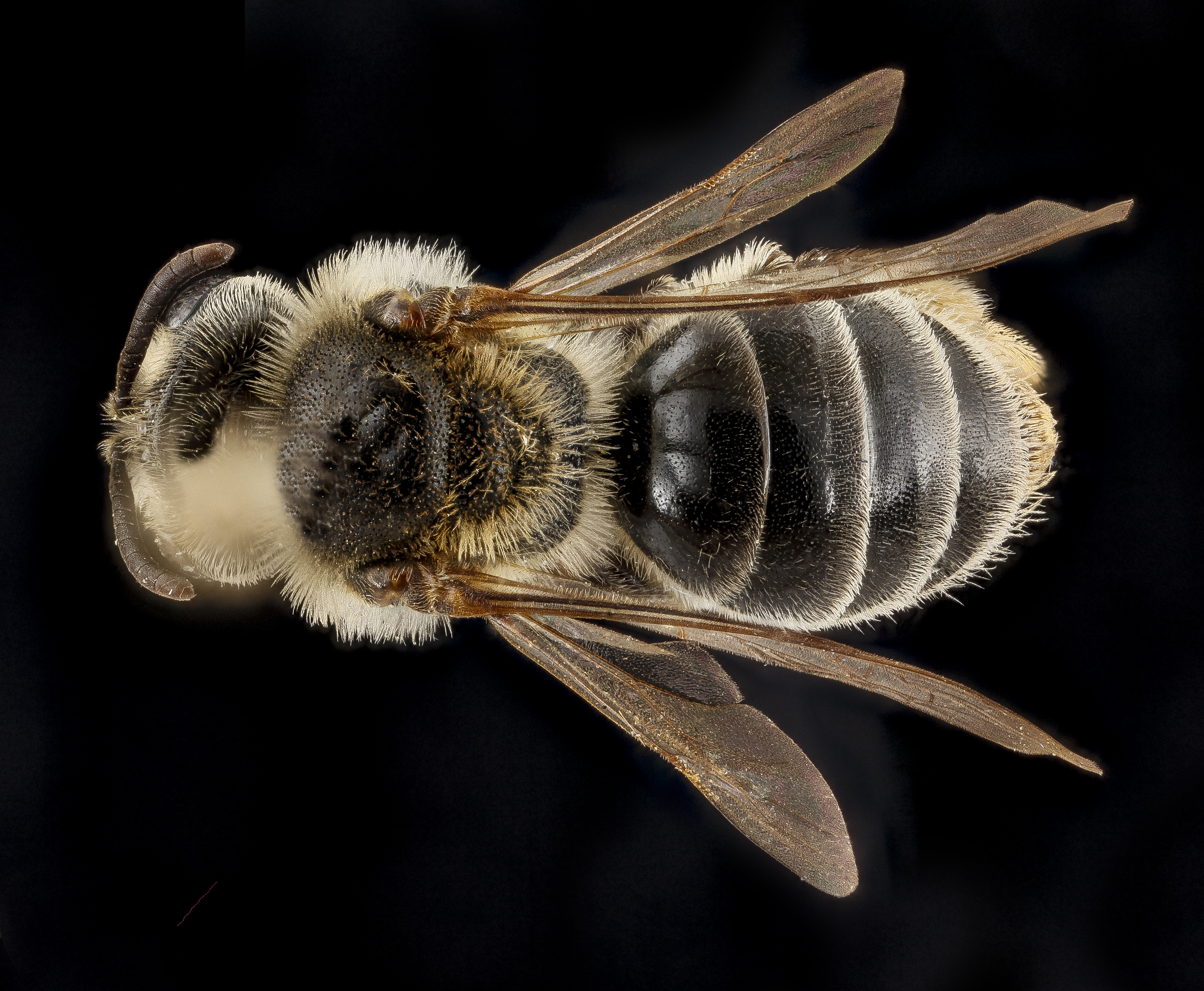

Scientific classification
- Domain: Eukaryota
- Kingdom: Animalia
- Phylum: Arthropoda
- Class: Insecta
- Order: Hymenoptera
- Family: Andrenidae
- Genus: Andrena
- Species: A. krigiana

Binomial name
- Andrena krigiana Robertson, 1901

= Andrena krigiana =

Species of bee

Andrena krigiana is a species in the family Andrenidae ("mining bees"), in the order Hymenoptera ("ants, bees, wasps and sawflies"). The species is known generally as the "dwarf-dandelion andrena". It is found in North America.
