= Andrena scotoptera =

Scientific classification
- Kingdom: Animalia
- Phylum: Arthropoda
- Class: Insecta
- Order: Hymenoptera
- Family: Andrenidae
- Genus: Andrena
- Species: A. scotoptera

Binomial name
- Andrena scotoptera Cockerell, 1934

Synonyms
- Andrena fuscipennis LaBerge & Bouseman, 1970

Species of bee

Andrena scotoptera is a species of mining bee in the family Andrenidae. It is found in North America.
