= Andrena palpalis =

Scientific classification
- Domain: Eukaryota
- Kingdom: Animalia
- Phylum: Arthropoda
- Class: Insecta
- Order: Hymenoptera
- Family: Andrenidae
- Genus: Andrena
- Species: A. palpalis

Binomial name
- Andrena palpalis Timberlake, 1951

Species of bee

Andrena palpalis is a species of mining bees in the family Andrenidae. It is found in Central America and North America.
