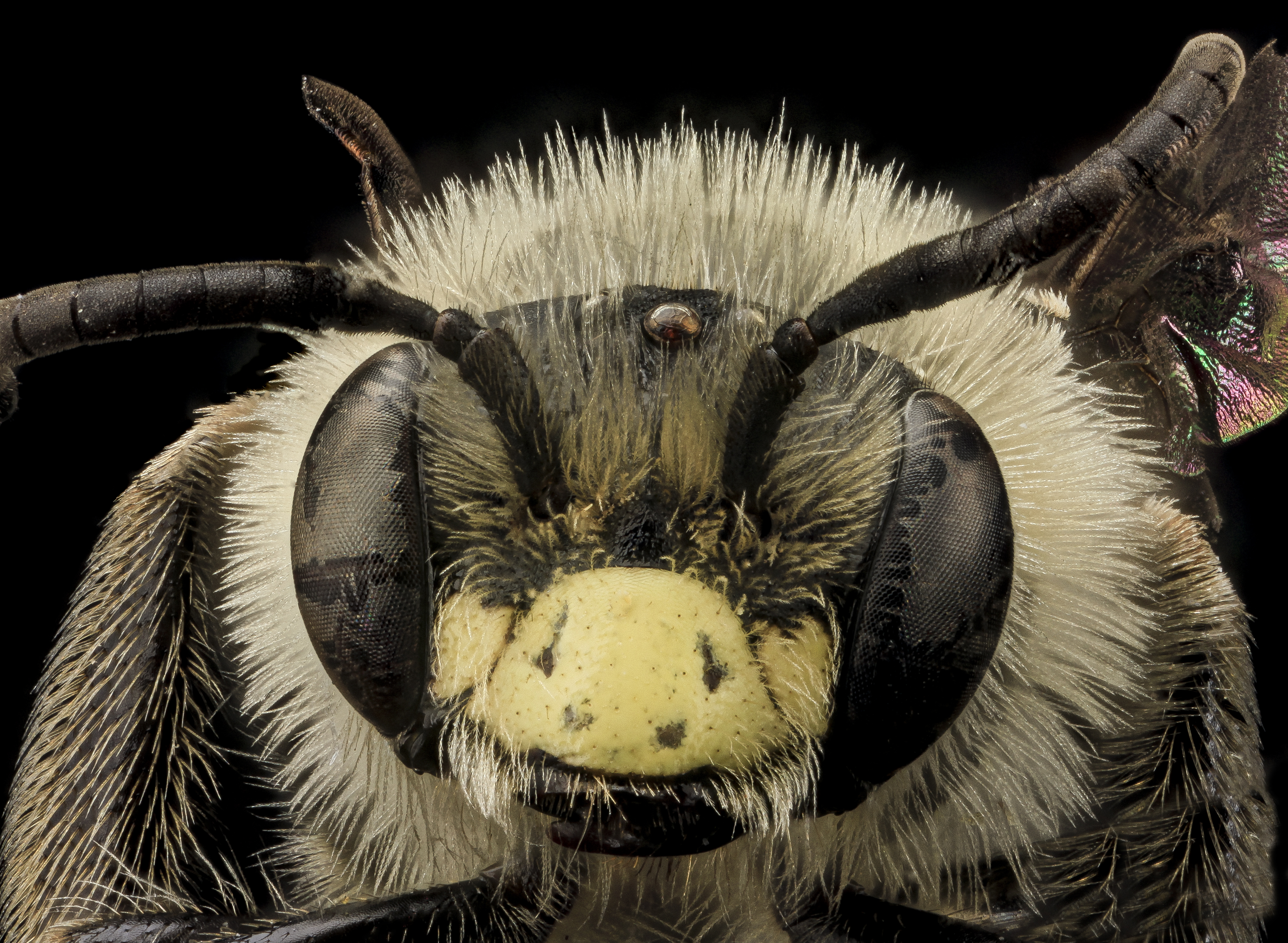

Scientific classification
- Domain: Eukaryota
- Kingdom: Animalia
- Phylum: Arthropoda
- Class: Insecta
- Order: Hymenoptera
- Family: Andrenidae
- Genus: Andrena
- Species: A. asteris

Binomial name
- Andrena asteris Robertson, 1891

= Andrena asteris =

Miner bee species in the family Andrenidae

The aster miner bee (Andrena asteris) is a species of miner bee in the family Andrenidae. It is found in North America.

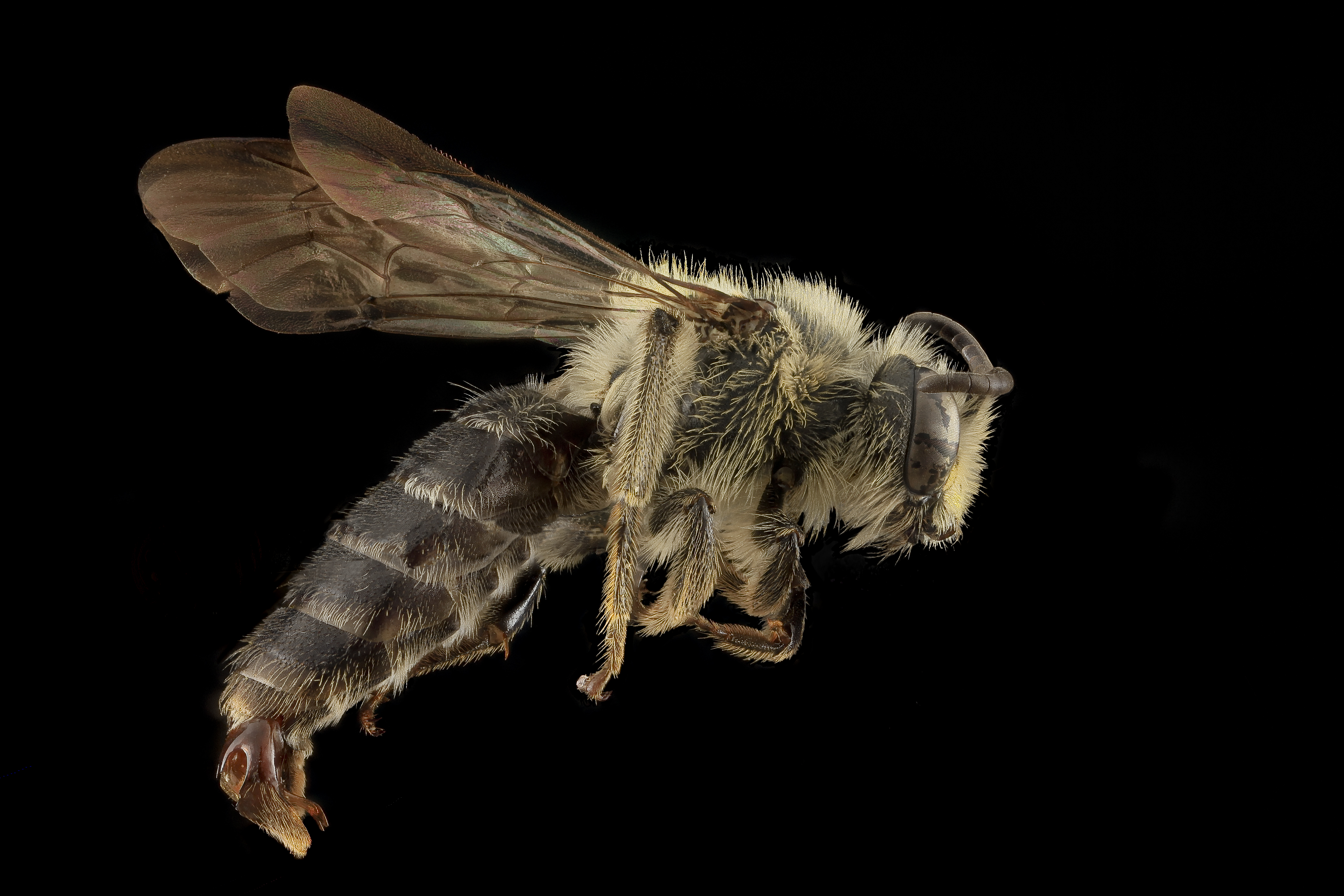
Aster miner, Andrena asteris

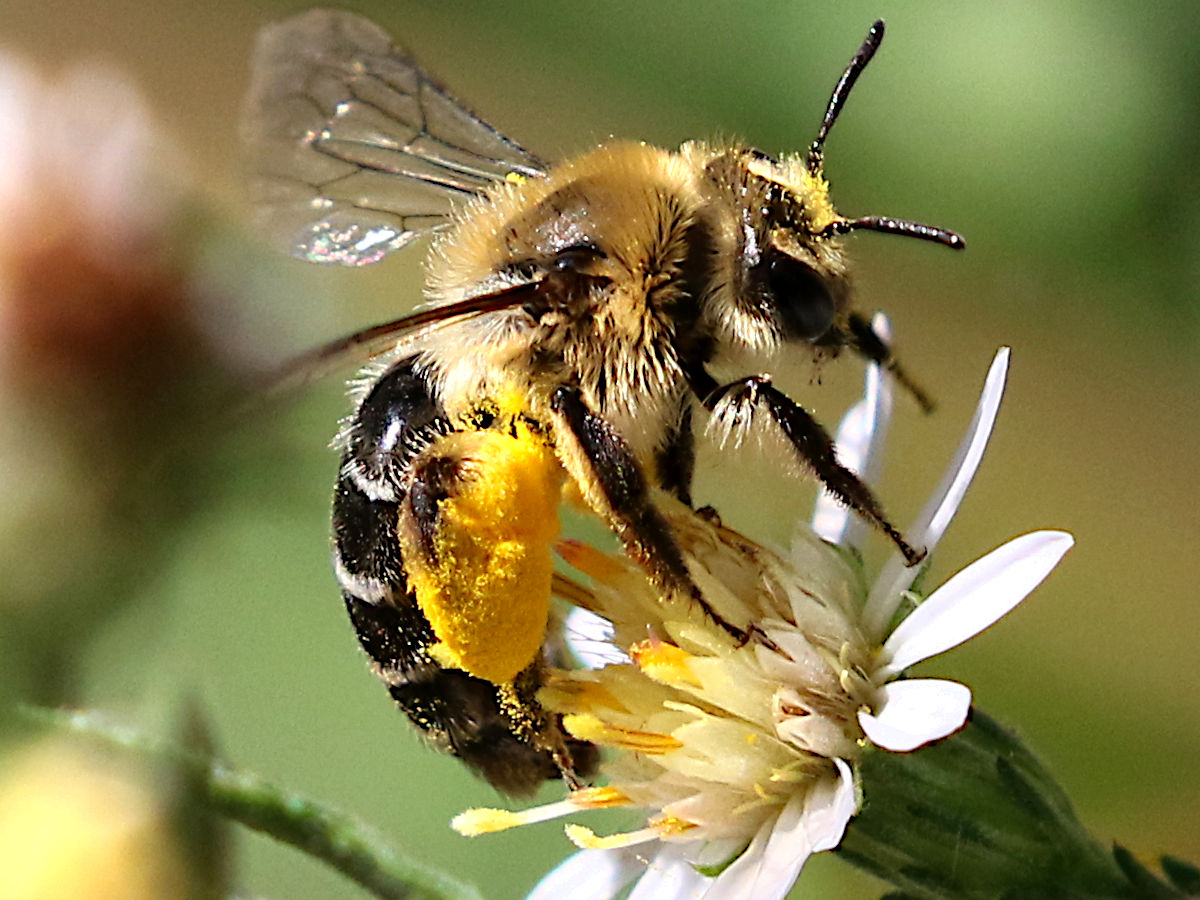
Collecting pollen
