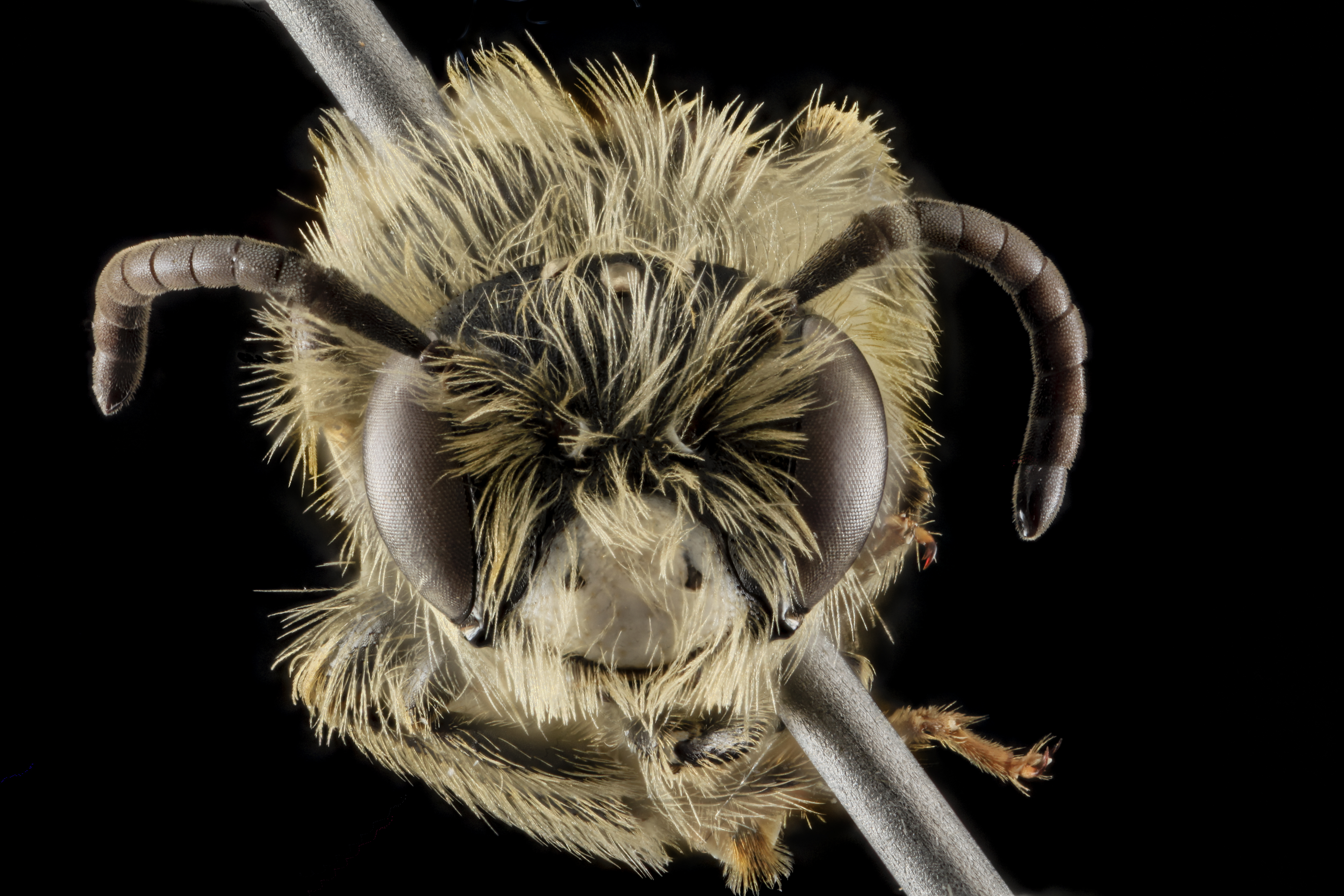

Scientific classification
- Domain: Eukaryota
- Kingdom: Animalia
- Phylum: Arthropoda
- Class: Insecta
- Order: Hymenoptera
- Family: Andrenidae
- Genus: Andrena
- Species: A. arabis

Binomial name
- Andrena arabis Robertson, 1897

= Andrena arabis =

Miner bee species in the family Andrenidae

The mustard miner bee (Andrena arabis) is a species of miner bee in the family Andrenidae. It is found in North America.
