= Andrena haynesi =

Scientific classification
- Kingdom: Animalia
- Phylum: Arthropoda
- Clade: Pancrustacea
- Class: Insecta
- Order: Hymenoptera
- Family: Andrenidae
- Genus: Andrena
- Species: A. haynesi

Binomial name
- Andrena haynesi Viereck & Cockerell, 1914

Species of bee

The Haynes's miner bee (Andrena haynesi) is a species of miner bee in the family Andrenidae. Another common name for this species is Haynes' andrena. It is found in North America.
