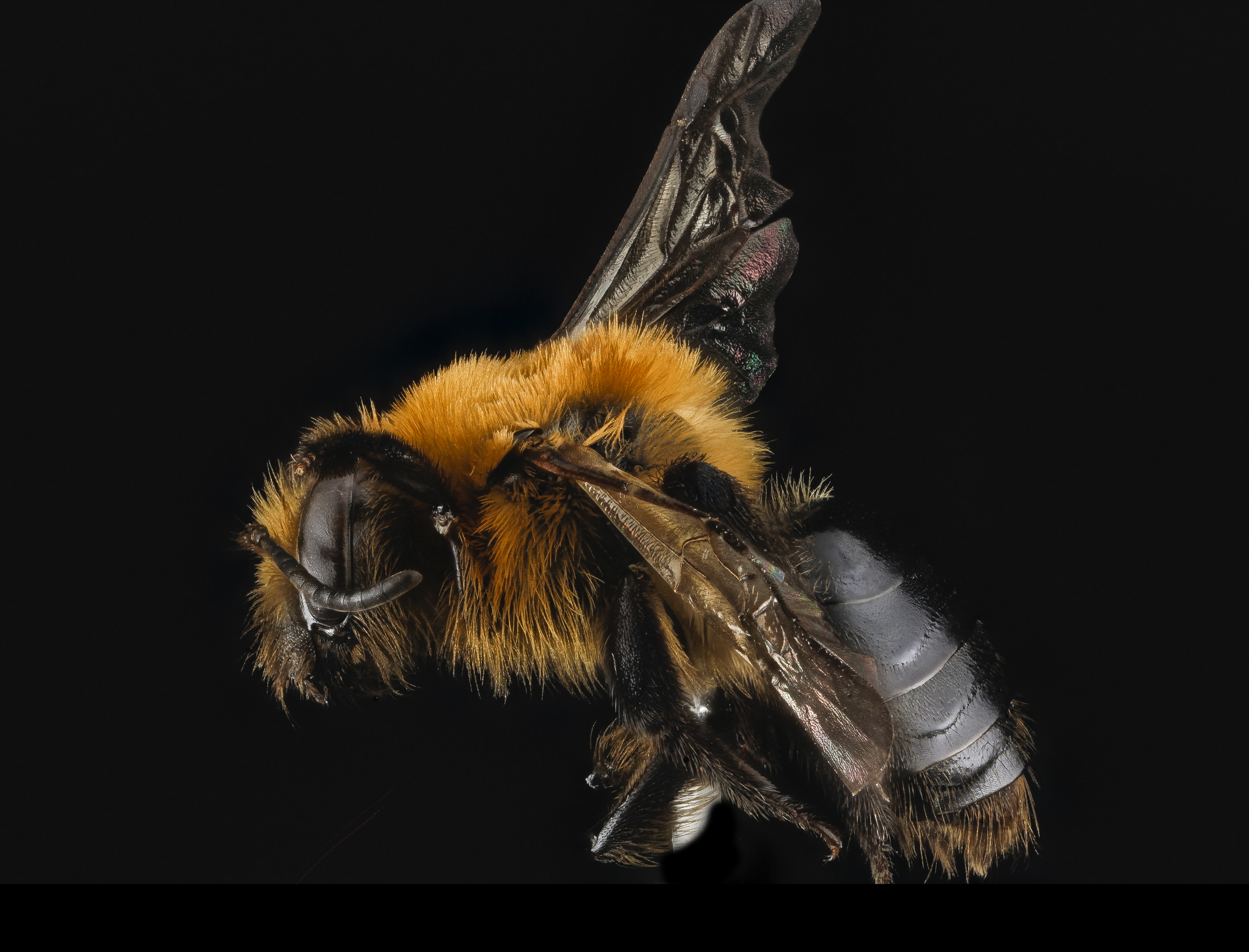

Scientific classification
- Kingdom: Animalia
- Phylum: Arthropoda
- Class: Insecta
- Order: Hymenoptera
- Family: Andrenidae
- Genus: Andrena
- Species: A. dunningi

Binomial name
- Andrena dunningi Cockerell, 1898

= Andrena dunningi =

Species of bee

Andrena dunningi, also known as Dunning's miner bee, is a species of miner bee in the family Andrenidae. It is found in North America.
