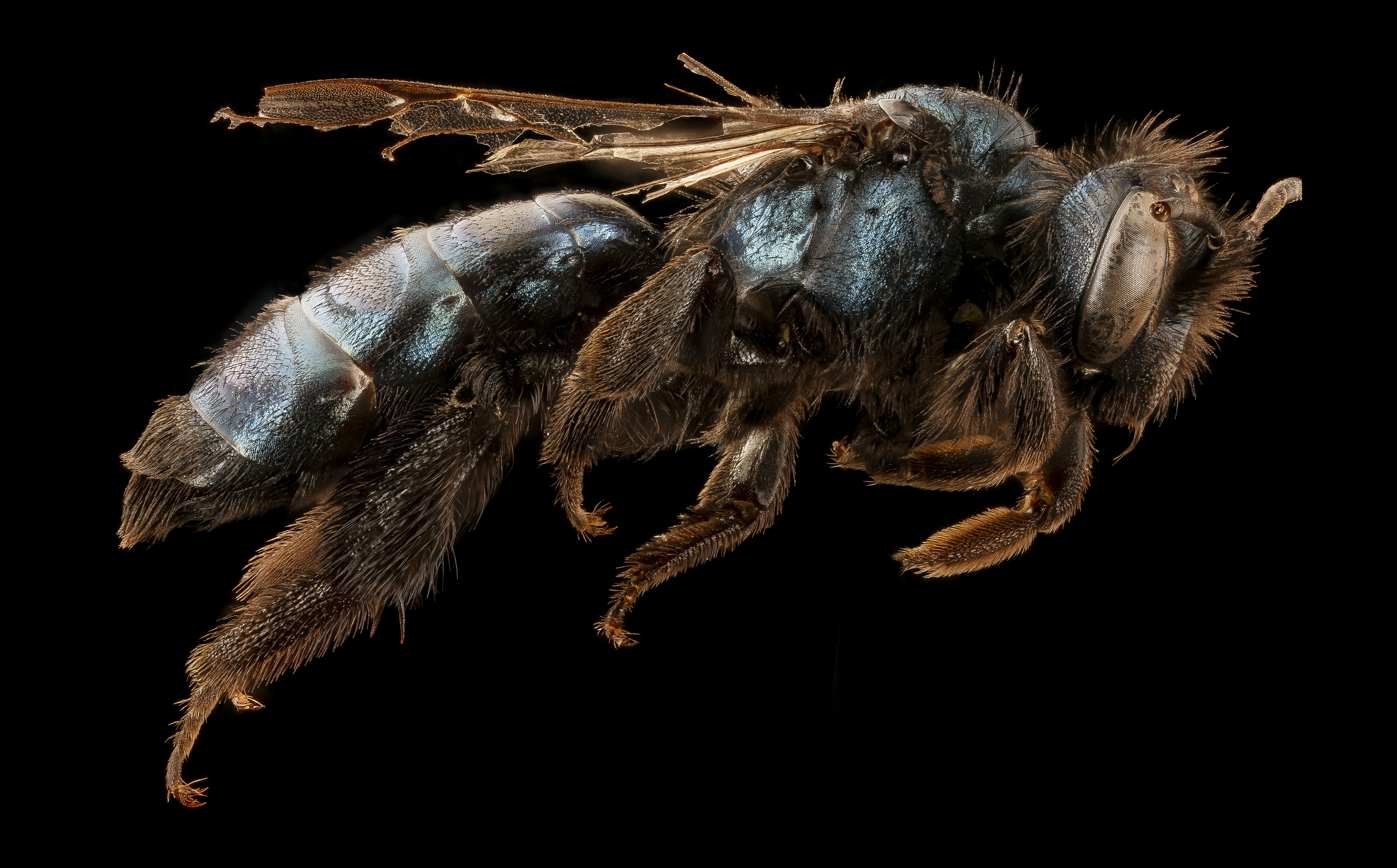
- Andrena chapmanae female

Scientific classification
- Domain: Eukaryota
- Kingdom: Animalia
- Phylum: Arthropoda
- Class: Insecta
- Order: Hymenoptera
- Family: Andrenidae
- Genus: Andrena
- Species: A. chapmanae

Binomial name
- Andrena chapmanae Viereck, 1904

= Andrena chapmanae =

Miner bee species in the family Andrenidae

The Chapman's miner bee (Andrena chapmanae) is a species of miner bee in the family Andrenidae. It is found in North America.
