= Andrena nothocalaidis =

Scientific classification
- Kingdom: Animalia
- Phylum: Arthropoda
- Class: Insecta
- Order: Hymenoptera
- Family: Andrenidae
- Genus: Andrena
- Species: A. nothocalaidis

Binomial name
- Andrena nothocalaidis Cockerell, 1905

Miner bee species in the family Andrenidae

The false dandelion miner bee (Andrena nothocalaidis) is a species of miner bee in the family Andrenidae. It is found in North America.
