= Andrena berberidis =

Scientific classification
- Domain: Eukaryota
- Kingdom: Animalia
- Phylum: Arthropoda
- Class: Insecta
- Order: Hymenoptera
- Family: Andrenidae
- Genus: Andrena
- Species: A. berberidis

Binomial name
- Andrena berberidis Cockerell, 1905

Species of bee

The barberry miner bee (Andrena berberidis) is a species of miner bee in the family Andrenidae. It is found in North America.
