= Andrena transnigra =

Scientific classification
- Domain: Eukaryota
- Kingdom: Animalia
- Phylum: Arthropoda
- Class: Insecta
- Order: Hymenoptera
- Family: Andrenidae
- Genus: Andrena
- Species: A. transnigra

Binomial name
- Andrena transnigra Viereck, 1904

Species of bee

The black-banded miner bee (Andrena transnigra) is a species of miner bee in the family Andrenidae. It is found in North America.
