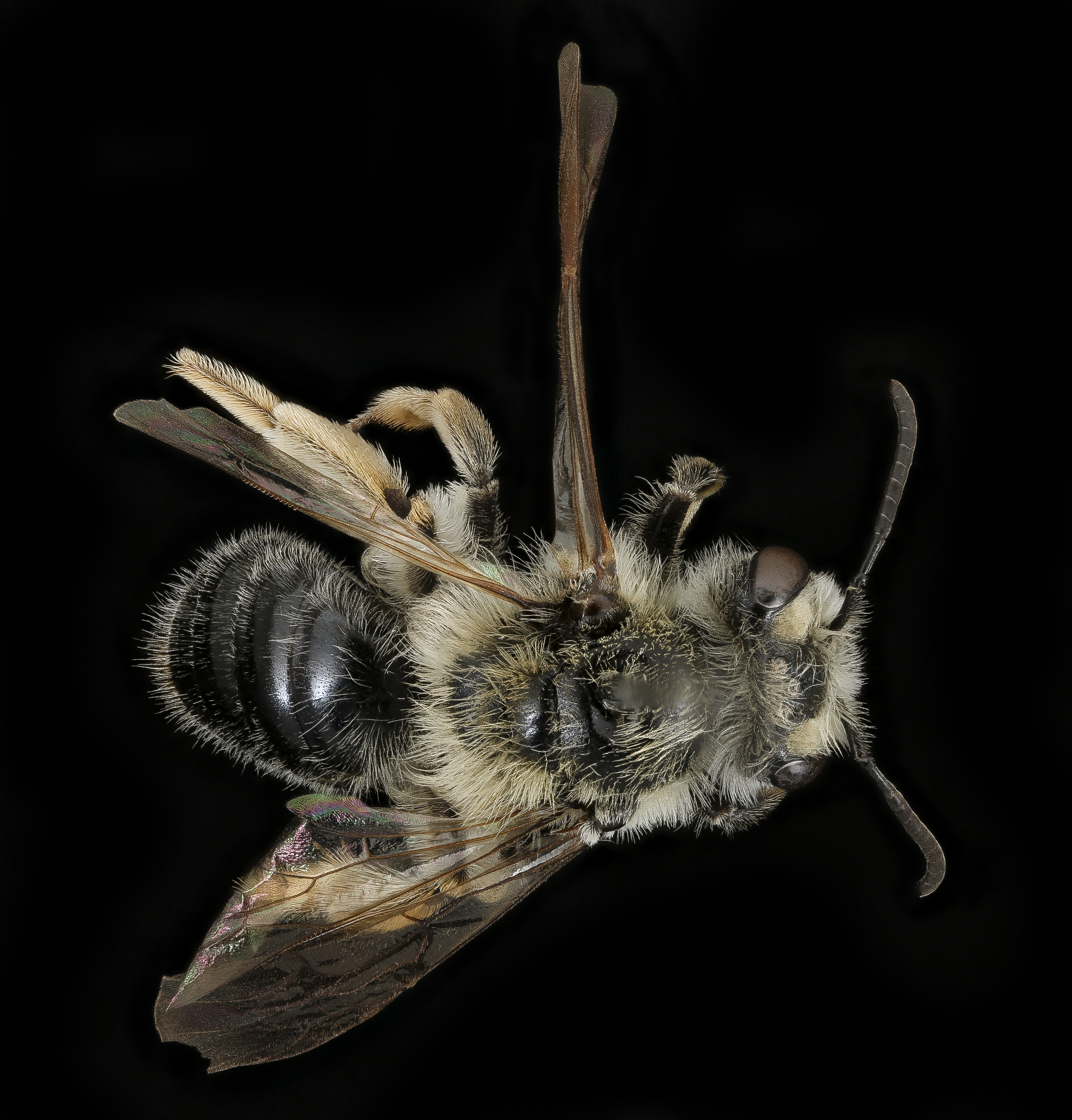

Scientific classification
- Domain: Eukaryota
- Kingdom: Animalia
- Phylum: Arthropoda
- Class: Insecta
- Order: Hymenoptera
- Family: Andrenidae
- Genus: Andrena
- Species: A. macoupinensis

Binomial name
- Andrena macoupinensis Robertson, 1900

= Andrena macoupinensis =

Miner bee species in the family Andrenidae

The Macoupin County miner bee (Andrena macoupinensis) is a species of miner bee in the family Andrenidae. It is found in Central America and North America.
