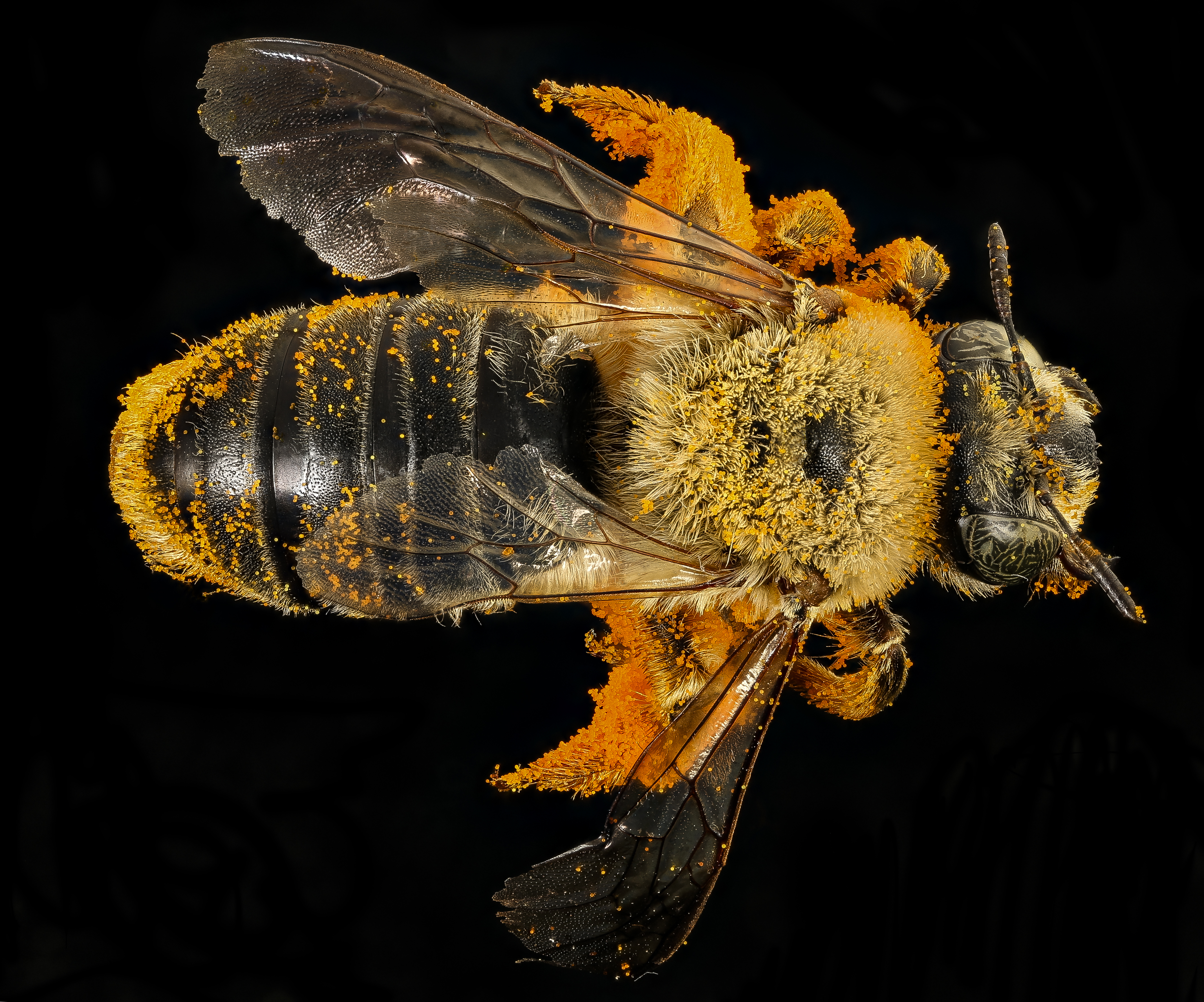
- Protoxaea gloriosa

Scientific classification
- Kingdom: Animalia
- Phylum: Arthropoda
- Class: Insecta
- Order: Hymenoptera
- Family: Andrenidae
- Subfamily: Oxaeinae
- Genus: Protoxaea; Cockerell & Porter, 1899

= Protoxaea =

Genus of bees

Protoxaea is a genus of bees in the family Andrenidae. There are at least three described species in Protoxaea.

== Species ==
These three species belong to the genus Protoxaea:

- Protoxaea australis Hurd & Linsley, 1976
- Protoxaea gloriosa (Fox, 1893) (glorious protoxaea)
- Protoxaea micheneri Hurd & Linsley, 1976
