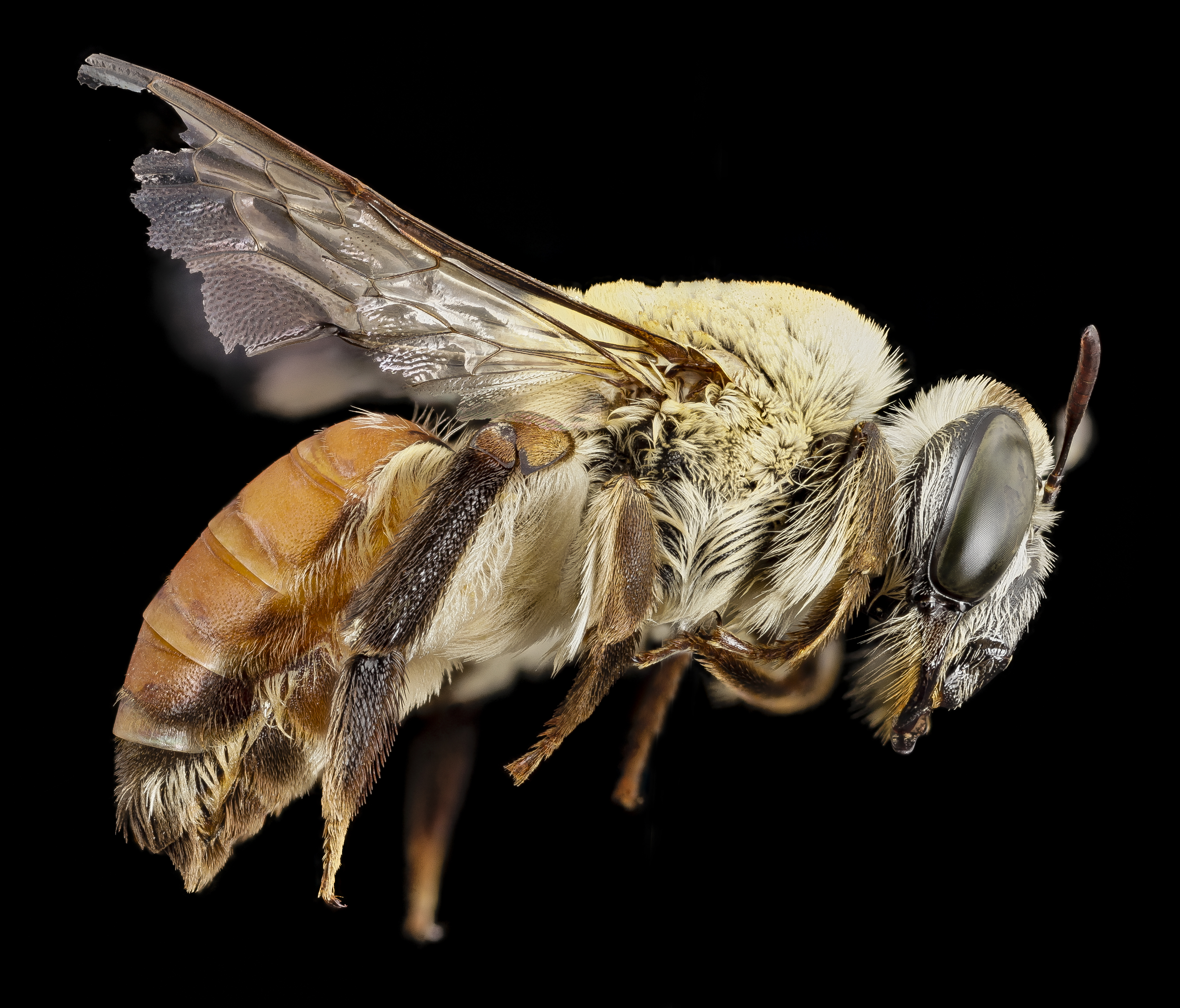
- Female Notoxaea ferruginae

Scientific classification
- Domain: Eukaryota
- Kingdom: Animalia
- Phylum: Arthropoda
- Class: Insecta
- Order: Hymenoptera
- Family: Andrenidae
- Subfamily: Oxaeinae

Genera
- Mesoxaea; Notoxaea; Oxaea; Protoxaea

= Oxaeinae =

Subfamily of bees

The Oxaeinae are an exclusively American subfamily of the bee family Andrenidae, consisting of large (13–26 mm), fast-flying bees, often with large eyes. The four constituent genera, with a total of 19 described species, range from the United States to Argentina. Some resources still use the name Oxaeidae, and treat them as a family, but they were moved to subfamily status in 1995.

They can be best recognized by the extremely low position of the ocelli on their faces, a feature not shared by any other large bees. Their nests are deep burrows in the ground, and provisions are a soupy mixture of pollen and nectar in cells with a waxlike waterproof lining.
