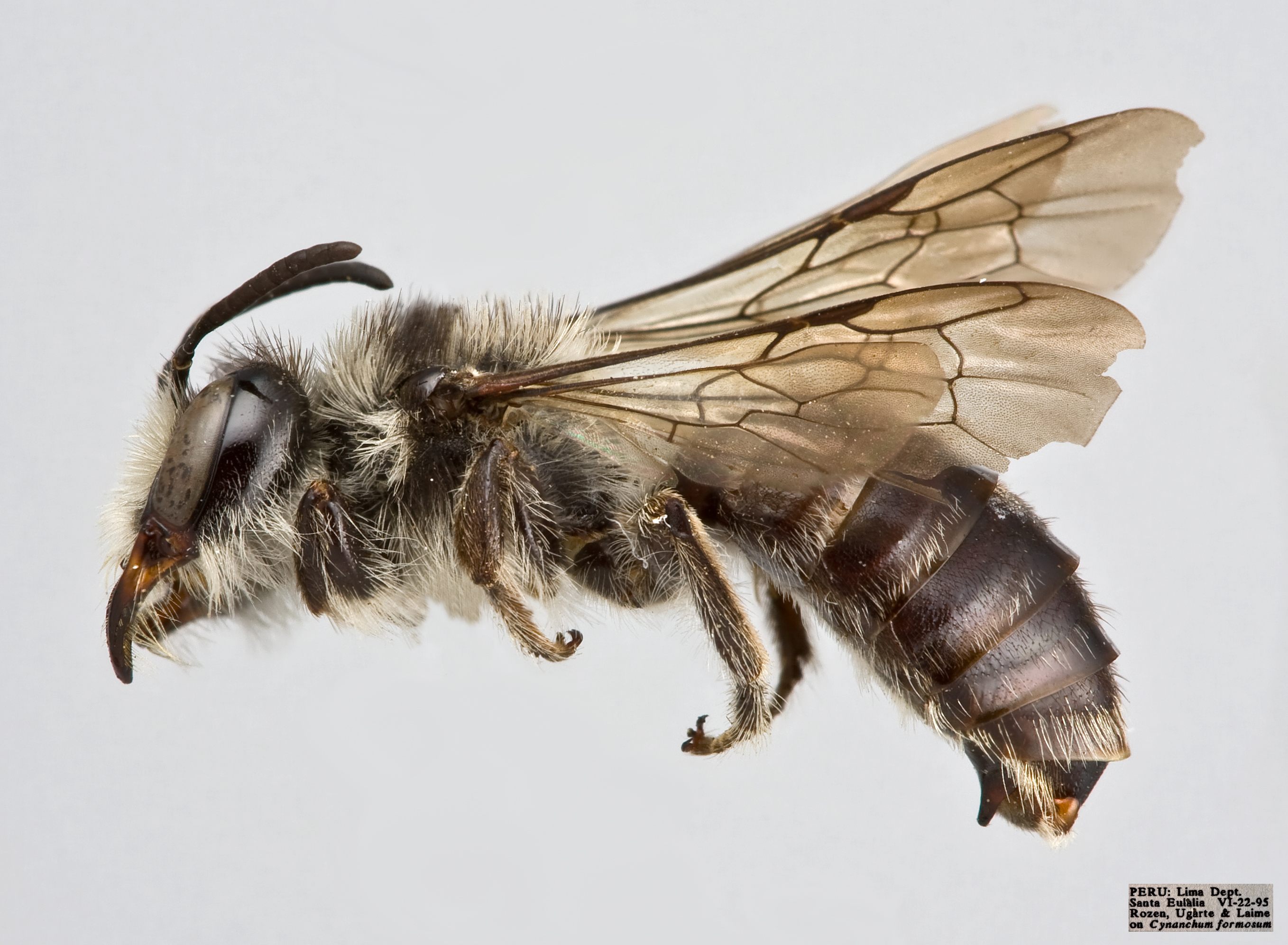
- Male
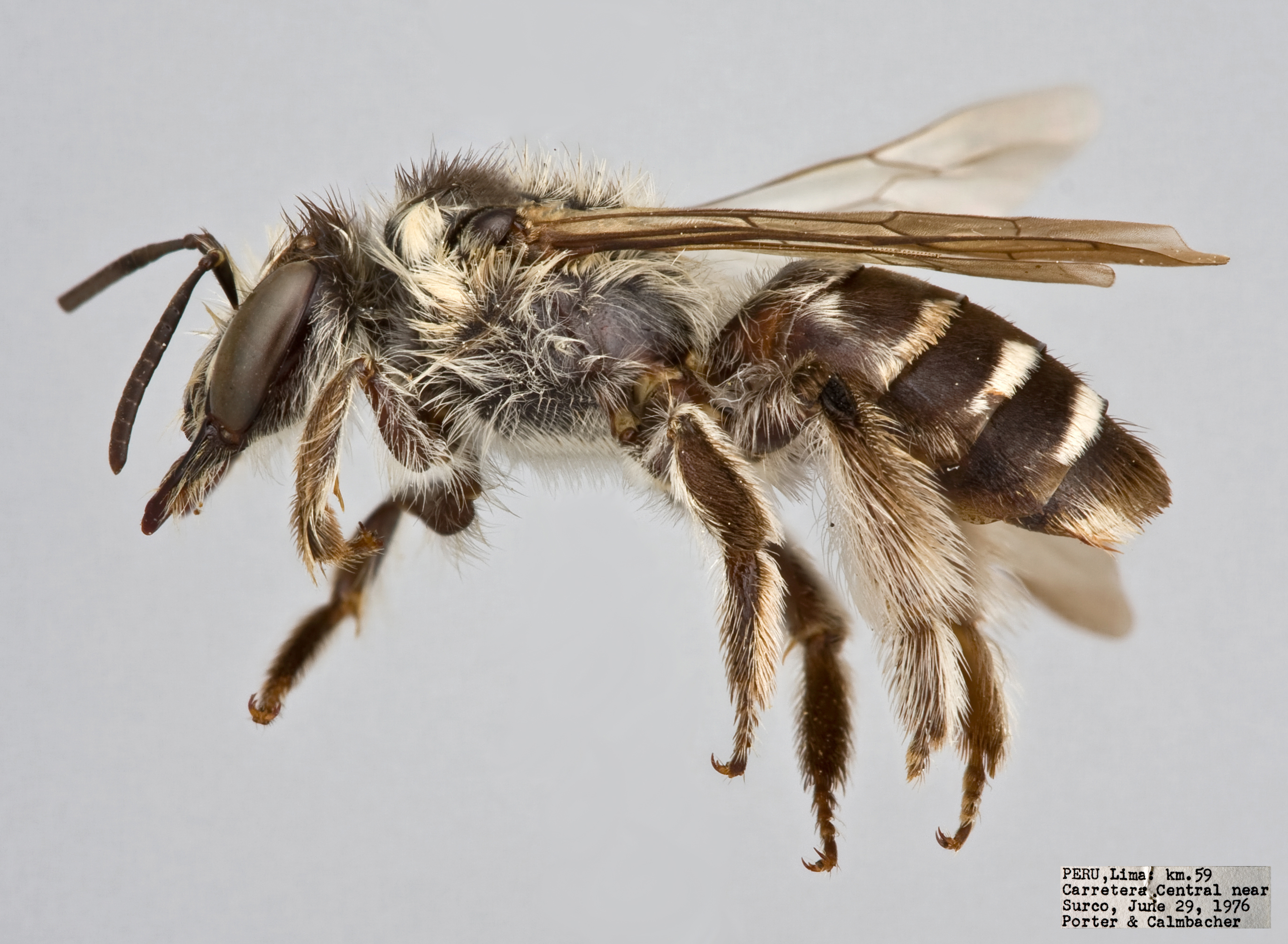
- Female

Scientific classification
- Kingdom: Animalia
- Phylum: Arthropoda
- Clade: Pancrustacea
- Class: Insecta
- Order: Hymenoptera
- Family: Andrenidae
- Subfamily: Alocandreninae; Michener, 2000
- Genus: Alocandrena
- Species: A. porteri

Binomial name
- Alocandrena porteri Michener, 1986

= Alocandrena =

Genus of bees

The bee subfamily Alocandreninae contains only one genus and one species, Alocandrena porteri, which is found in Peru. It seems to be restricted to the western side of the Andes Mountains.

It has been recorded throughout the year, suggesting multiple generations per year. Females collect pollen from Lycopersicon species.
