= Flavomeliturgula =

Scientific classification
- Domain: Eukaryota
- Kingdom: Animalia
- Phylum: Arthropoda
- Class: Insecta
- Order: Hymenoptera
- Family: Andrenidae
- Genus: Flavomeliturgula; Patiny, 1999

Genus of bees

Flavomeliturgula is a genus of bees belonging to the family Andrenidae.

Species:

- Flavomeliturgula berangeriae Patiny, 2002
- Flavomeliturgula centaurea (Warncke, 1985)
- Flavomeliturgula deserta (Warncke, 1985)
- Flavomeliturgula lacrymosa (Popov, 1967)
- Flavomeliturgula schwarziana Patiny, 2004
- Flavomeliturgula tapana (Warncke, 1985)
