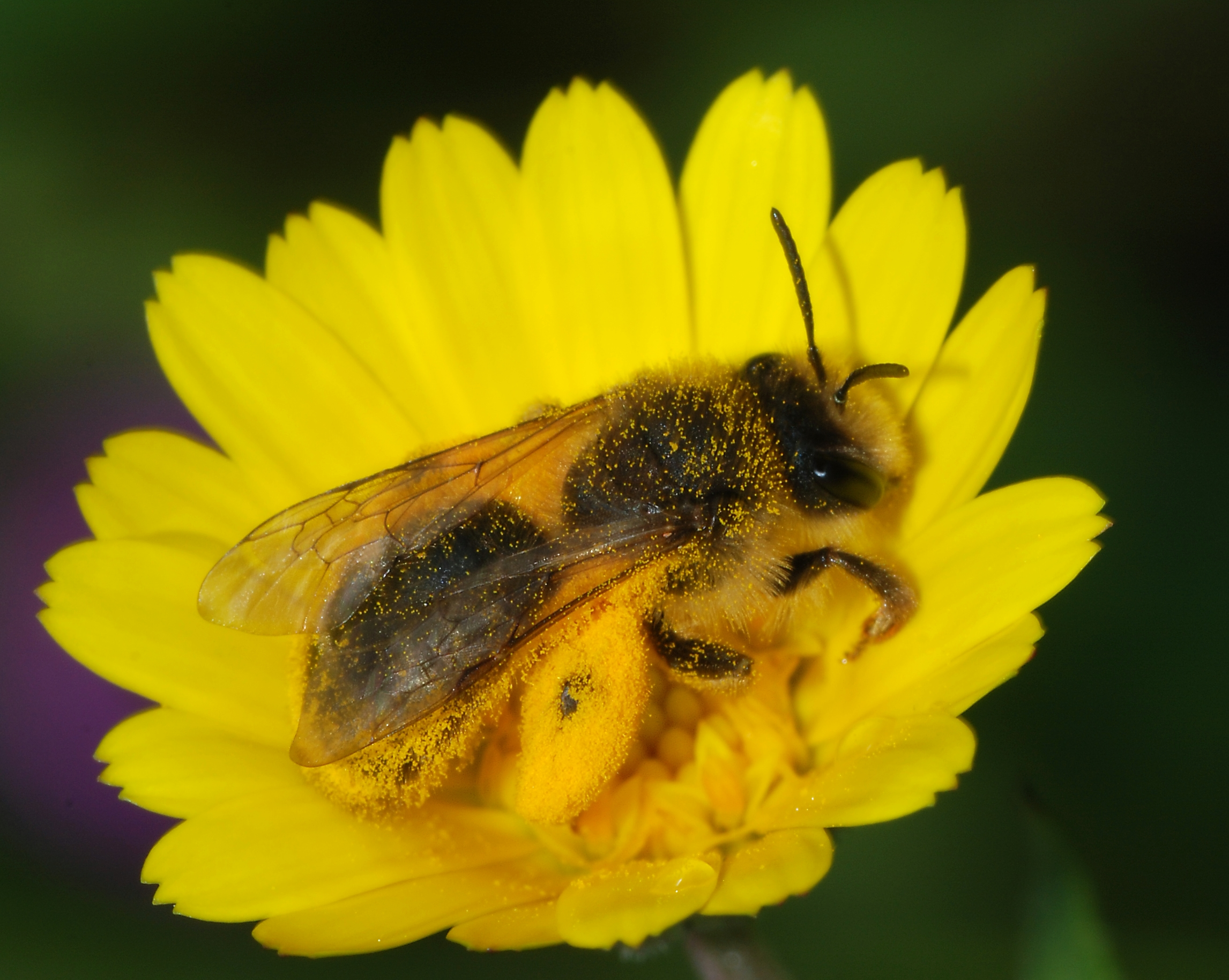

Scientific classification
- Kingdom: Animalia
- Phylum: Arthropoda
- Clade: Pancrustacea
- Class: Insecta
- Order: Hymenoptera
- Clade: Anthophila
- Family: Andrenidae

Subfamilies
- Alocandreninae; Andreninae; Oxaeinae; Panurginae

= Andrenidae =

Family of bees

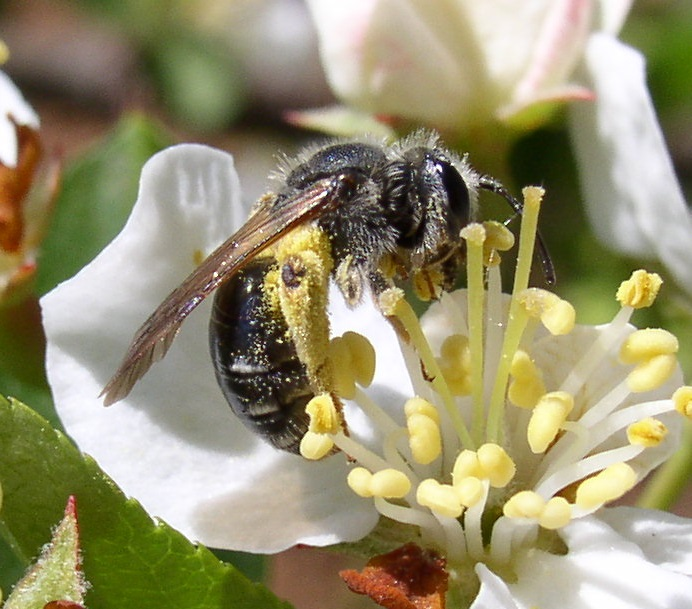
Andrena sp.

The Andrenidae (commonly known as mining bees) are a large, nearly cosmopolitan family of solitary, ground-nesting bees. Most of the family's diversity is located in temperate or arid areas (warm temperate xeric). It includes some enormous genera (e.g., Andrena with over 1300 species, and Perdita with over 700). One of the subfamilies, Oxaeinae, is so different in appearance that they were typically accorded family status, but careful phylogenetic analysis reveals them to be an offshoot within the Andrenidae, very close to the Andreninae.

== Description ==
The Andrenidae are typically small to moderate-sized bees, which often have scopae on the basal segments of the leg in addition to the tibia, and are commonly oligolectic (especially within the subfamily Panurginae). They can be distinguished from other bee families by the presence of two subantennal sutures on the face, a primitive trait shared with the sphecoid wasps. Many groups also have depressions or grooves called "foveae" on the head near the upper margin of the eyes, another feature seen in sphecoids, and also shared by some Colletidae. Andrenids are among the few bee families that have no kleptoparasites. The family contains a very large number of taxa, especially among the Panurginae, whose sting apparatus is so reduced that they are effectively unable to sting.

The subfamily Oxaeinae is rather different in appearance from the other subfamilies, being large, fast-flying bees with large eyes, resembling some of the larger Colletidae.

The Andrenidae are known from the Eocene-Oligocene boundary, around 34 Mya, within Florissant shale.

=== "Nocturnal" species ===
The Andrenidae are one of the four bee families that contain some crepuscular species; these species are active only at dusk or in the early evening, and therefore technically considered vespertine. In the Andrenidae, such species occur primarily in the subfamily Panurginae. These bees, as is typical in such cases, have greatly enlarged ocelli, though one crepuscular subgenus of Andrena has normal ocelli. The other families with some crepuscular species are Halictidae, Colletidae, and Apidae.

== Genera ==
- Subfamily Alocandreninae
  - Alocandrena Michener, 2000
- Subfamily Andreninae
  - Ancylandrena Cockerell, 1930
  - Andrena Fabricius, 1775
  - Euherbstia Friese, 1925
  - Megandrena Cockerell, 1927
  - Orphana Vachal, 1909
- Subfamily Oxaeinae
  - Mesoxaea Hurd & Linsley, 1976
  - Notoxaea Hurd & Linsley, 1976
  - Oxaea Klug, 1807
  - Protoxaea Hurd & Linsley
- Subfamily Panurginae
  - Tribe Protandrenini
    - Anthemurgus
    - Anthrenoides
    - Chaeturginus
    - Liphanthus
    - Neffapis
    - Parapsaenythia
    - Protandrena
    - Psaenythia
    - Pseudopanurgus
    - Rhophitulus
  - Tribe Panurgini
    - Avpanurgus
    - Camptopoeum
    - Panurginus
    - Panurgus
  - Tribe Nolanomelissini
    - Nolanomelissa
  - Tribe Melitturgini
    - Belliturgula
    - Borgatomelissa
    - Flavomeliturgula
    - Gasparinahla
    - Khuzimelissa
    - Melitturga
    - Meliturgula
    - Mermiglossa
    - Plesiopanurgus
  - Tribe Protomeliturgini
    - Protomeliturga
  - Tribe Perditini
    - Macrotera
    - Perdita
  - Tribe Calliopsini
    - Acamptopoeum
    - Arhysosage
    - Calliopsis
    - Callonychium
    - Litocalliopsis
    - Spinoliella
    - Xeranthrena
