= List of Perdita species =

This is a partial list of species in the genus Perdita.

== Perdita species ==
- Perdita abbreviata Timberlake, 1980
- Perdita abdominalis Timberlake, 1960
- Perdita abducta Timberlake, 1980
- Perdita acaciae Timberlake, 1962
- Perdita acapulcona Timberlake, 1954
- Perdita accepta Timberlake, 1958
- Perdita aculeata Timberlake, 1968
- Perdita adjuncta Timberlake, 1958
- Perdita adustiventris Timberlake, 1964
- Perdita aemula Timberlake, 1958
- Perdita affecta Timberlake, 1971
- Perdita affinis Cresson, 1878
- Perdita agasta Timberlake, 1958
- Perdita ainsliei Crawford, 1932
- Perdita albata Timberlake, 1968
- Perdita albescens Timberlake, 1980
- Perdita albihirta Timberlake, 1954
- Perdita albipennis Cresson, 1868 – shiny green miner bee
- Perdita albipes Timberlake, 1962
- Perdita albiventris Timberlake, 1964
- Perdita albofasciata Timberlake, 1968
- Perdita albomaculata Timberlake, 1980
- Perdita albomarginata Timberlake, 1980
- Perdita albonotata Timberlake, 1954
- Perdita albopicta Timberlake, 1958
- Perdita albovittata Cockerell, 1895
- Perdita alexi Timberlake, 1968
- Perdita algodones Timberlake, 1980
- Perdita ambigua Timberlake, 1964
- Perdita amicula Timberlake, 1964
- Perdita amoena Timberlake, 1956
- Perdita ampla Timberlake, 1971
- Perdita amplipennis Timberlake, 1962
- Perdita ancoralis Timberlake, 1968
- Perdita angellata Griswold, 1993
- Perdita annectens Timberlake, 1968
- Perdita annexa Timberlake, 1960
- Perdita apacheorum Timberlake, 1960
- Perdita aperta Timberlake, 1968
- Perdita apicalis Timberlake, 1977
- Perdita aplopappi Timberlake, 1960
- Perdita arenaria Timberlake, 1954
- Perdita argemones Timberlake, 1956
- Perdita aridella Timberlake, 1960
- Perdita arizonica Timberlake, 1956
- Perdita arnaudi Timberlake, 1958
- Perdita ashmeadi Cockerell, 1899
- Perdita assimilis Timberlake, 1964
- Perdita associata Timberlake, 1968
- Perdita asteris Cockerell, 1896
- Perdita atrata Timberlake, 1964
- Perdita atriventris Timberlake, 1960
- Perdita atrovirens Timberlake, 1968
- Perdita aureovittata Cockerell, 1916
- Perdita austini Cockerell, 1895
- Perdita autumnalis Timberlake, 1977
- Perdita baccharidis Cockerell, 1900
- Perdita barri Timberlake, 1964
- Perdita basinicola Timberlake, 1968
- Perdita beameri Timberlake, 1964
- Perdita beata Cockerell, 1895
- Perdita beatula Timberlake, 1960
- Perdita bebbiae Timberlake, 1956
- Perdita bellula Timberlake, 1954
- Perdita bequaerti Viereck, 1917 – Bequaert's miner bee
- Perdita bequaertiana Cockerell, 1951
- Perdita bicuspidariae Timberlake, 1962
- Perdita bidentata Timberlake, 1956
- Perdita bifasciata Timberlake, 1977
- Perdita bigeloviae Cockerell, 1896
- Perdita biguttata Timberlake, 1962
- Perdita bilobata Timberlake, 1956
- Perdita binotata Timberlake, 1954
- Perdita biornata Timberlake, 1980
- Perdita biparticeps Cockerell, 1896
- Perdita bishoppi Cockerell, 1906
- Perdita bispinata Timberlake, 1956
- Perdita blaisdelli Timberlake, 1954
- Perdita blanda Timberlake, 1958
- Perdita blatchleyi Timberlake, 1952
- Perdita boharti Portman & Griswold, 2016
- Perdita boltoniae (Robertson, 1902)
- Perdita brachyglossa Timberlake, 1971
- Perdita bradleyana Timberlake, 1954
- Perdita bradleyi Viereck, 1907
- Perdita brevicornis Timberlake, 1980
- Perdita brevihirta Timberlake, 1962
- Perdita bridwelli Timberlake, 1960
- Perdita bruneri Cockerell, 1897 – Bruner's miner bee
- Perdita butleri Timberlake, 1960
- Perdita caerulescens Timberlake, 1964
- Perdita californica (Cresson, 1878)
- Perdita callicerata Cockerell, 1897
- Perdita calloleuca Cockerell, 1922
- Perdita calochorti Timberlake, 1956
- Perdita cambarella Cockerell, 1906
- Perdita cara Timberlake, 1958
- Perdita cazieri Timberlake, 1960
- Perdita celadona Griswold & Miller, 2010
- Perdita cephalotes (Cresson, 1878)
- Perdita chamaesarachae Cockerell, 1896
- Perdita chemsaki Timberlake, 1980
- Perdita chihuahua Timberlake, 1964
- Perdita chionostoma Timberlake, 1964
- Perdita chloris Timberlake, 1960
- Perdita chrysophila Cockerell, 1896
- Perdita chrysothamni Timberlake, 1958
- Perdita ciliata Timberlake, 1958
- Perdita cinctiventris Timberlake, 1977
- Perdita cingulata Timberlake, 1980
- Perdita cladothricis Cockerell, 1896
- Perdita clarifacies Cockerell, 1923
- Perdita claripennis Timberlake, 1968
- Perdita claypolei Cockerell, 1901
- Perdita cleomellae Cockerell, 1925
- Perdita clypeata Timberlake, 1962
- Perdita coahuilensis Timberlake, 1954
- Perdita coalingensis Timberlake, 1956
- Perdita cochiseana Timberlake, 1971
- Perdita cognata Timberlake, 1960
- Perdita coldeniae Timberlake, 1954
- Perdita colei Timberlake, 1962
- Perdita compacta Timberlake, 1971
- Perdita compactilis Timberlake, 1980
- Perdita compta Timberlake, 1964
- Perdita concolor Timberlake, 1968
- Perdita concors Timberlake, 1958
- Perdita confinis Timberlake, 1971
- Perdita confusa Timberlake, 1964
- Perdita congrua Timberlake, 1971
- Perdita consimilis Timberlake, 1968
- Perdita consobrina Timberlake, 1928
- Perdita coreopsidis Cockerell, 1906
- Perdita cornishiana Timberlake, 1977
- Perdita covilleae Timberlake, 1958
- Perdita cowaniae Timberlake, 1956
- Perdita cracens Timberlake, 1980
- Perdita crandalli Timberlake, 1962
- Perdita crassihirta Timberlake, 1968
- Perdita crassula Timberlake, 1958
- Perdita craterognatha Timberlake, 1968
- Perdita croceipes Timberlake, 1960
- Perdita crotonis Cockerell, 1896
- Perdita cruciferarum Timberlake, 1968
- Perdita cushmani Timberlake, 1964
- Perdita cuspidata Timberlake, 1964
- Perdita dalyi Timberlake, 1960
- Perdita dammersi Timberlake, 1964
- Perdita dasylirii Cockerell, 1907
- Perdita davidsoni Timberlake, 1964
- Perdita debilis Timberlake, 1968
- Perdita decemnotata Timberlake, 1962
- Perdita deltophora Timberlake, 1964
- Perdita dentata Timberlake, 1964
- Perdita depressa Timberlake, 1968
- Perdita desdemona Portman, 2016
- Perdita dichroa Timberlake, 1958
- Perdita dicksoni Timberlake, 1958
- Perdita differens Timberlake, 1964
- Perdita difficilis Timberlake, 1964
- Perdita digna Timberlake, 1964
- Perdita digressa Timberlake, 1968
- Perdita dimidiata Timberlake, 1962
- Perdita diminutiva Timberlake, 1977
- Perdita discors Timberlake, 1964
- Perdita discreta Timberlake, 1954
- Perdita dispar Timberlake, 1964
- Perdita dispilota Timberlake, 1968
- Perdita dissimulans Timberlake, 1954
- Perdita distans Timberlake, 1962
- Perdita distincta Timberlake, 1964
- Perdita distropica Timberlake, 1956
- Perdita divaricata Timberlake, 1968
- Perdita diversa Timberlake, 1954
- Perdita dolanensis Neff, 2003
- Perdita dolichocephala Swenk & Cockerell, 1907
- Perdita dreisbachi Timberlake, 1964
- Perdita drymariae Timberlake, 1960
- Perdita dubia Cockerell, 1896
- Perdita duplicata Timberlake, 1964
- Perdita duplonotata Timberlake, 1956
- Perdita durangoensis Timberlake, 1960
- Perdita eickworti Timberlake, 1977
- Perdita electa Timberlake, 1960
- Perdita elegans Timberlake, 1960
- Perdita elimata Timberlake, 1964
- Perdita emarginata Timberlake, 1964
- Perdita ensenadensis Timberlake, 1960
- Perdita eremica Timberlake, 1964
- Perdita eremophila Timberlake, 1964
- Perdita eriastri Timberlake, 1964
- Perdita ericameriae Timberlake, 1958
- Perdita eriogoni Cockerell, 1925
- Perdita erudita Cockerell, 1923
- Perdita erythropyga Timberlake, 1962
- Perdita esmeraldensis Timberlake, 1977
- Perdita eucnides Timberlake, 1964
- Perdita euphorbiae Timberlake, 1954
- Perdita euzonata Timberlake, 1964
- Perdita evansi Timberlake, 1964
- Perdita ewarti Timberlake, 1971
- Perdita excellens Timberlake, 1958
- Perdita exclamans Cockerell, 1895
- Perdita exigua Timberlake, 1964
- Perdita exilis Timberlake, 1962
- Perdita eximia Timberlake, 1964
- Perdita exusta Portman & Griswold, 2016
- Perdita eysenhardtiae Timberlake, 1964
- Perdita falcata Timberlake, 1964
- Perdita fallax Cockerell, 1896 – deceptive miner bee
- Perdita fallugiae Timberlake, 1956
- Perdita fasciatella Timberlake, 1980
- Perdita fedorensis Cockerell, 1916
- Perdita festiva Timberlake, 1958
- Perdita fidissima Timberlake, 1968
- Perdita fieldi Timberlake, 1956
- Perdita flavicauda Timberlake, 1960
- Perdita flaviceps Timberlake, 1960
- Perdita flavicornis Timberlake, 1980
- Perdita flavifrons Timberlake, 1968
- Perdita flavipes Timberlake, 1964
- Perdita flaviventris Timberlake, 1980
- Perdita floridensis Timberlake, 1928
- Perdita florissantella Cockerell, 1906
- Perdita foleyi Timberlake, 1958
- Perdita fortis Timberlake, 1971
- Perdita foveata Timberlake, 1956
- Perdita foxi Cockerell, 1895
- Perdita fracticincta Timberlake, 1953
- Perdita frontalis Timberlake, 1968
- Perdita fulvescens Timberlake, 1980
- Perdita fulvicauda Timberlake, 1962
- Perdita fulviventris Timberlake, 1980
- Perdita fumipennis Timberlake, 1964
- Perdita fuscipes Timberlake, 1968
- Perdita gemella Timberlake, 1964
- Perdita geminata Timberlake, 1964
- Perdita genalis Timberlake, 1964
- Perdita gentilis Timberlake, 1962
- Perdita georgica Timberlake, 1928
- Perdita gerardiae Crawford, 1932
- Perdita gerhardi Viereck, 1904
- Perdita gertschi Timberlake, 1958
- Perdita giliae Timberlake, 1954
- Perdita gillaspyi Timberlake, 1980
- Perdita glabrella Timberlake, 1968
- Perdita glabrescens Timberlake, 1962
- Perdita glamis Timberlake, 1980
- Perdita gracilior Timberlake, 1977
- Perdita gracilis Timberlake, 1964
- Perdita graenicheri Timberlake, 1947
- Perdita grandiceps Cockerell, 1896
- Perdita gratiosa Timberlake, 1971
- Perdita greggiae Timberlake, 1968
- Perdita guerreroensis Timberlake, 1964
- Perdita gutierreziae Cockerell, 1896
- Perdita haigi Timberlake, 1962
- Perdita halictoides Smith, 1853 – sweatbee-like miner bee
- Perdita halli Timberlake, 1960
- Perdita heliophila Cockerell, 1916
- Perdita heliotropii Cockerell, 1900
- Perdita heterothecae Cockerell, 1900
- Perdita hidalgoensis Timberlake, 1968
- Perdita hiemalis Timberlake, 1980
- Perdita hilaris Timberlake, 1968
- Perdita hippolyta Portman & Griswold, 2016
- Perdita hirsuta Cockerell, 1896
- Perdita hirtella Timberlake, 1968
- Perdita hirticeps Timberlake, 1960
- Perdita hirtuosa Timberlake, 1980
- Perdita holoxantha Timberlake, 1962
- Perdita hooki Portman & Neff, 2016
- Perdita hubbelli Timberlake, 1980
- Perdita humilis Timberlake, 1968
- Perdita hurdi Timberlake, 1956
- Perdita idahoensis Timberlake, 1958
- Perdita idonea Timberlake, 1968
- Perdita ignota Cockerell, 1896
- Perdita imbellis Timberlake, 1968
- Perdita imberbis Timberlake, 1968
- Perdita impar Timberlake, 1980
- Perdita impigra Timberlake, 1968
- Perdita impressa Timberlake, 1968
- Perdita impunctifrons Timberlake, 1958
- Perdita incana Timberlake, 1958
- Perdita incompta Timberlake, 1964
- Perdita indioensis Timberlake, 1960
- Perdita infelix Timberlake, 1964
- Perdita inflexa Timberlake, 1956
- Perdita infuscata Timberlake, 1977
- Perdita innotata Timberlake, 1964
- Perdita inornata Timberlake, 1962
- Perdita insequens Timberlake, 1968
- Perdita interrupta Cresson, 1878
- Perdita interserta Cockerell, 1922
- Perdita inyoensis Timberlake, 1977
- Perdita irregularis Timberlake, 1971
- Perdita irwini Timberlake, 1968
- Perdita isocomae Timberlake, 1958
- Perdita janzeni Timberlake, 1980
- Perdita jonesi Cockerell, 1906
- Perdita jucunda Timberlake, 1962
- Perdita kanabensis Timberlake, 1971
- Perdita keiferi Timberlake, 1928
- Perdita kiowi Griswold, 1988
- Perdita knowltoni Timberlake, 1960
- Perdita koebelei Timberlake, 1964
- Perdita krombeini Timberlake, 1960
- Perdita labergei Timberlake, 1960
- Perdita labrata Timberlake, 1962
- Perdita labrosa Timberlake, 1980
- Perdita larreae Cockerell, 1896
- Perdita lasiogastra Timberlake, 1929
- Perdita lateralis Timberlake, 1962
- Perdita laticincta Swenk & Cockerell, 1907
- Perdita layiae Cockerell, 1938
- Perdita leechi Timberlake, 1968
- Perdita lenis Timberlake, 1958
- Perdita lepachidis Cockerell, 1896
- Perdita lepidosparti Timberlake, 1958
- Perdita leucogastra Timberlake, 1964
- Perdita leucophylli Timberlake, 1964
- Perdita leucosticta Timberlake, 1964
- Perdita leucostoma Timberlake, 1956
- Perdita levigata Timberlake, 1968
- Perdita levissima Timberlake, 1964
- Perdita lingualis Cockerell, 1896
- Perdita linsleyi Timberlake, 1964
- Perdita lipovskyi Timberlake, 1964
- Perdita lompocensis Timberlake, 1958
- Perdita lucens Timberlake, 1962
- Perdita luciae Cockerell, 1899
- Perdita lucidella Timberlake, 1964
- Perdita luculenta Timberlake, 1968
- Perdita lunulata Timberlake, 1962
- Perdita lustrans Timberlake, 1964
- Perdita luteiceps Cockerell, 1896
- Perdita luteola Cockerell, 1894
- Perdita lycii Timberlake, 1964
- Perdita macneilli Timberlake, 1964
- Perdita macrostoma Cockerell, 1922
- Perdita macswaini Timberlake, 1964
- Perdita maculigera Cockerell, 1896 – black-spotted miner bee
- Perdita maculipes Cockerell, 1896
- Perdita maculosa Timberlake, 1958
- Perdita maerens Timberlake, 1964
- Perdita maesta Timberlake, 1964
- Perdita malacothricis Timberlake, 1956
- Perdita mandibularis Timberlake, 1954
- Perdita marcialis Cockerell, 1896
- Perdita marginata Timberlake, 1964
- Perdita maritima Timberlake, 1954
- Perdita martini Cockerell, 1895
- Perdita mazatlanica Timberlake, 1980
- Perdita meconis Griswold, 1993
- Perdita media Timberlake, 1960
- Perdita medialis Timberlake, 1977
- Perdita megapyga Timberlake, 1954
- Perdita melanderi Timberlake, 1968
- Perdita melanochlora Cockerell, 1922
- Perdita melanogastra Timberlake, 1964
- Perdita melanops Timberlake, 1968
- Perdita melanostoma Swenk & Cockerell, 1907
- Perdita melanura Timberlake, 1962
- Perdita mentzeliae Cockerell, 1896
- Perdita mentzeliarum Cockerell, 1897
- Perdita mesillensis Timberlake, 1968
- Perdita mexicanorum Cockerell, 1896
- Perdita micans Timberlake, 1971
- Perdita michelbacheri Timberlake, 1962
- Perdita micheneri Timberlake, 1956
- Perdita microsticta Timberlake, 1960
- Perdita mimosae Timberlake, 1964
- Perdita mimula Timberlake, 1960
- Perdita minima Cockerell, 1923
- Perdita minuta Timberlake, 1980
- Perdita missionis Timberlake, 1958
- Perdita mitchelli Timberlake, 1947
- Perdita mitis Timberlake, 1971
- Perdita moabensis Timberlake, 1971
- Perdita modestissima Timberlake, 1968
- Perdita mohavensis Timberlake, 1956
- Perdita moldenkei Timberlake, 1980
- Perdita montereyensis Timberlake, 1956
- Perdita morelosana Timberlake, 1968
- Perdita mormonica Timberlake, 1956
- Perdita morula Timberlake, 1980
- Perdita mucronata Timberlake, 1956
- Perdita multiflorae Parker, 1988
- Perdita munda Timberlake, 1958
- Perdita munita Timberlake, 1964
- Perdita namatophila Timberlake, 1954
- Perdita nanula Timberlake, 1960
- Perdita nasuta Timberlake, 1962
- Perdita navarretiae Timberlake, 1958
- Perdita nayaritensis Timberlake, 1980
- Perdita nebrascensis Swenk & Cockerell, 1907
- Perdita neffi Timberlake, 1980
- Perdita nevadensis Cockerell, 1896 – Nevada miner bee
- Perdita nevadiana Timberlake, 1980
- Perdita nigricornis Timberlake, 1964
- Perdita nigridia Timberlake, 1962
- Perdita nigriventris Timberlake, 1954
- Perdita nigroaenea Timberlake, 1968
- Perdita nigrocaerulea Timberlake, 1954
- Perdita nigrocincta Timberlake, 1958
- Perdita nigroclypeata Timberlake, 1964
- Perdita nigronotata Timberlake, 1964
- Perdita nigroviridis Timberlake, 1954
- Perdita nitens Timberlake, 1956
- Perdita nodosicornia Timberlake, 1968
- Perdita novaeangliae Viereck, 1907
- Perdita novoleona Timberlake, 1971
- Perdita nubila Timberlake, 1958
- Perdita nuda Cockerell, 1896
- Perdita numerata Cockerell, 1895
- Perdita nuttalliae Portman, 2016
- Perdita oaxacana Timberlake, 1964
- Perdita obispoensis Timberlake, 1958
- Perdita obliqua Timberlake, 1928
- Perdita obliquenotata Timberlake, 1968
- Perdita obscurata Cresson, 1878
- Perdita obscurella Timberlake, 1964
- Perdita obscurifascies Timberlake, 1968
- Perdita obscuripennis Timberlake, 1954
- Perdita obtusa Timberlake, 1968
- Perdita occidua Timberlake, 1960
- Perdita occlusa Timberlake, 1968
- Perdita octomaculata (Say, 1824) – eight-spotted miner bee
- Perdita omani Timberlake, 1964
- Perdita optiva Timberlake, 1954
- Perdita ordinata Timberlake, 1962
- Perdita oregonensis Timberlake, 1929
- Perdita oreophila Timberlake, 1964
- Perdita otiosa Timberlake, 1971
- Perdita ovaliceps Timberlake, 1964
- Perdita pachygnatha Timberlake, 1977
- Perdita pallida Timberlake, 1954
- Perdita pallidipes Timberlake, 1964
- Perdita pallidiventris Timberlake, 1962
- Perdita panocheana Timberlake, 1964
- Perdita paroselae Timberlake, 1960
- Perdita parryellae Timberlake, 1971
- Perdita paula Timberlake, 1968
- Perdita pauliana Timberlake, 1977
- Perdita pauxilla Timberlake, 1980
- Perdita pectidis Cockerell, 1896
- Perdita pectoralis Timberlake, 1968
- Perdita peculiaris Timberlake, 1953
- Perdita pedernalensis Neff, 2010
- Perdita pelargoides (Cockerell, 1916)
- Perdita percincta Timberlake, 1968
- Perdita perixantha Timberlake, 1960
- Perdita perlucens Timberlake, 1977
- Perdita pernitens Timberlake, 1980
- Perdita perpallida Cockerell, 1901 – pale miner bee
- Perdita perplexa Timberlake, 1962
- Perdita perpulchra Cockerell, 1896
- Perdita phymatae Cockerell, 1895
- Perdita physalidis Timberlake, 1958
- Perdita picturata Timberlake, 1960
- Perdita pilonotata Timberlake, 1980
- Perdita pinguis Timberlake, 1980
- Perdita placens Timberlake, 1968
- Perdita placida Timberlake, 1958
- Perdita planifrons Timberlake, 1968
- Perdita plucheae Timberlake, 1960
- Perdita polita Timberlake, 1958
- Perdita politissima Timberlake, 1980
- Perdita polycarpae Timberlake, 1954
- Perdita polygonellae Timberlake, 1954
- Perdita polytropica Timberlake, 1962
- Perdita pratensis Timberlake, 1980
- Perdita pratti Cockerell, 1906
- Perdita pretiosa Timberlake, 1980 – precious miner bee
- Perdita primula Timberlake, 1958
- Perdita prionopsidis Timberlake, 1960
- Perdita prodigiosa Portman & Griswold, 2016
- Perdita propinqua Timberlake, 1964
- Perdita propodealis Timberlake, 1954
- Perdita prosopidis Timberlake, 1964
- Perdita proxima Timberlake, 1958
- Perdita pubescens Timberlake, 1968
- Perdita pueblana Timberlake, 1964
- Perdita pulchella Timberlake, 1954
- Perdita pulliventris Timberlake, 1968
- Perdita pumila Timberlake, 1964
- Perdita puncticeps Timberlake, 1971
- Perdita punctifera Cockerell, 1914
- Perdita punctifrons Timberlake, 1958
- Perdita punctosignata Cockerell, 1895
- Perdita punctulata Timberlake, 1958
- Perdita purpurascens Timberlake, 1956
- Perdita pusilla Timberlake, 1964
- Perdita pusillissima Timberlake, 1977
- Perdita pygidialis Timberlake, 1980
- Perdita pyrifera Cockerell, 1925
- Perdita quadraticeps Timberlake, 1964
- Perdita quadrinotata Timberlake, 1968
- Perdita quadrisignata Timberlake, 1956
- Perdita quinquebalteata Timberlake, 1960
- Perdita rectangulata Cockerell, 1896
- Perdita recticincta Timberlake, 1980
- Perdita rehni Cockerell, 1907
- Perdita repens Timberlake, 1971
- Perdita reperta Timberlake, 1968
- Perdita replicans Timberlake, 1968
- Perdita retusa Timberlake, 1960
- Perdita rhodogastra Timberlake, 1954
- Perdita rhodura Cockerell, 1897
- Perdita rhois Cockerell, 1901
- Perdita rhondae Griswold, 2010
- Perdita richardsi Timberlake, 1964
- Perdita rivalis Timberlake, 1958
- Perdita robustula Timberlake, 1956
- Perdita rossi Timberlake, 1956
- Perdita rozeni Timberlake, 1968
- Perdita rudei Timberlake, 1980
- Perdita rufescens Timberlake, 1968
- Perdita rufiventris (Friese, 1917)
- Perdita salicis Cockerell, 1896
- Perdita salviae Timberlake, 1964
- Perdita sandhouseae Timberlake, 1964
- Perdita santaclarensis Timberlake, 1956
- Perdita schlingeri Timberlake, 1964
- Perdita schwartzi Timberlake, 1968
- Perdita scitula Timberlake, 1960
- Perdita scopata Timberlake, 1953
- Perdita scotti Timberlake, 1958
- Perdita scutellaris Timberlake, 1962
- Perdita sedulosa Timberlake, 1971
- Perdita sejuncta Timberlake, 1968
- Perdita semicaerulea Cockerell, 1896
- Perdita semicrocea Cockerell, 1895
- Perdita semilutea Timberlake, 1962
- Perdita senecionis Cockerell, 1896
- Perdita separata Timberlake, 1960
- Perdita sexfasciata Timberlake, 1954
- Perdita sexmaculata Cockerell, 1895
- Perdita sexnotata Timberlake, 1964
- Perdita shinnersi Timberlake, 1956
- Perdita sidae Cockerell, 1897
- Perdita similis Timberlake, 1958
- Perdita snellingi Timberlake, 1962
- Perdita snowii Cockerell, 1896
- Perdita socia Timberlake, 1968
- Perdita solidaginis Cockerell, 1922
- Perdita sonorensis Cockerell, 1899
- Perdita sparsa Fox, 1893
- Perdita speciosa Timberlake, 1971
- Perdita sphaeralceae Cockerell, 1896
- Perdita stabilis Timberlake, 1968
- Perdita stagei Timberlake, 1968
- Perdita stathamae Timberlake, 1964
- Perdita stenopyga Timberlake, 1964
- Perdita stephanomeriae Timberlake, 1954
- Perdita stepheni Timberlake, 1960
- Perdita sternalis Timberlake, 1964
- Perdita stigmalis Timberlake, 1971
- Perdita stottleri Cockerell, 1896 – Stottler's miner bee
- Perdita suavis Timberlake, 1980
- Perdita subfasciata Cockerell, 1897
- Perdita subglabra Timberlake, 1971
- Perdita submaerens Timberlake, 1980
- Perdita submedia Timberlake, 1971
- Perdita subrufiventris Timberlake, 1980
- Perdita subvestita Timberlake, 1968
- Perdita sulphuripes Timberlake, 1964
- Perdita supranitens Timberlake, 1964
- Perdita swenki Crawford, 1915 – Swenk's miner bee
- Perdita swezeyi Timberlake, 1958
- Perdita sycorax Portman, 2016
- Perdita tacita Timberlake, 1968
- Perdita taeniata Timberlake, 1971
- Perdita tarda Cockerell, 1896
- Perdita tenebrosa Timberlake, 1968
- Perdita tessellata Timberlake, 1964
- Perdita thelypodii Timberlake, 1958
- Perdita thermophila Timberlake, 1962
- Perdita timberlakei Cockerell, 1925
- Perdita titania Portman, 2016
- Perdita torchioi Timberlake, 1980
- Perdita tortifoliae Cockerell, 1906
- Perdita toschiae Timberlake, 1968
- Perdita townesi Timberlake, 1968
- Perdita townsendi Cockerell, 1896
- Perdita translineata Timberlake, 1960
- Perdita transversa Timberlake, 1956
- Perdita triangulifera Timberlake, 1964
- Perdita tricincta Timberlake, 1953
- Perdita tridentata Stevens, 1919
- Perdita trifasciata Timberlake, 1953
- Perdita trifida Timberlake, 1960
- Perdita trimaculata Timberlake, 1960
- Perdita trinotata Timberlake, 1964
- Perdita trisignata Cockerell, 1896
- Perdita tristissima Timberlake, 1968
- Perdita tropicalis Cockerell, 1912
- Perdita truncatella Timberlake, 1968
- Perdita tularensis Timberlake, 1956
- Perdita tumida Timberlake, 1980
- Perdita turgiceps Timberlake, 1954
- Perdita umbrata Timberlake, 1971
- Perdita utahensis Cockerell, 1896
- Perdita ute Griswold, 1993
- Perdita valida Timberlake, 1962
- Perdita vanduzeei Cockerell, 1923
- Perdita vandykei Timberlake, 1956
- Perdita variegata Timberlake, 1960
- Perdita varleyi Timberlake, 1962
- Perdita ventralis Fox, 1893
- Perdita venustella Timberlake, 1980
- Perdita verbesinae Cockerell, 1896
- Perdita veris Timberlake, 1968
- Perdita versuta Timberlake, 1962
- Perdita vesca Timberlake, 1968
- Perdita vespertina Griswold & Miller, 2010
- Perdita vestita Timberlake, 1958
- Perdita vicina Timberlake, 1962
- Perdita vidua Timberlake, 1964
- Perdita viridicollis Timberlake, 1971
- Perdita vittata Cockerell, 1923
- Perdita wasbaueri Timberlake, 1960
- Perdita washingtoniae Timberlake, 1971
- Perdita werneri Timberlake, 1968
- Perdita wheeleri Timberlake, 1928
- Perdita willcoxiana Timberlake, 1977
- Perdita williamsi Timberlake, 1962
- Perdita wilmattae Cockerell, 1906
- Perdita wislizeniae Timberlake, 1964
- Perdita wootonae Cockerell, 1898
- Perdita wyomingensis Cockerell, 1922
- Perdita xanthisma Cockerell, 1905
- Perdita xanthochroa Timberlake, 1960
- Perdita xanthodes Timberlake, 1960
- Perdita xanthops Timberlake, 1971
- Perdita xanthoxyli Timberlake, 1968
- Perdita xerophila Timberlake, 1962
- Perdita yanegai Portman, 2016
- Perdita yosemitensis Timberlake, 1962
- Perdita zavortinki Timberlake, 1977
- Perdita zebrata Cresson, 1878
- Perdita zonalis Cresson, 1879
