= Perdita distropica =

Scientific classification
- Domain: Eukaryota
- Kingdom: Animalia
- Phylum: Arthropoda
- Class: Insecta
- Order: Hymenoptera
- Family: Andrenidae
- Subfamily: Panurginae
- Genus: Perdita
- Species: P. distropica

Binomial name
- Perdita distropica Timberlake, 1956

Species of bee

Perdita distropica is a species of bee in the family Andrenidae. It is found in North America.
