= Perdita gerhardi =

Scientific classification
- Kingdom: Animalia
- Phylum: Arthropoda
- Clade: Pancrustacea
- Class: Insecta
- Order: Hymenoptera
- Family: Andrenidae
- Subfamily: Panurginae
- Genus: Perdita
- Species: P. gerhardi

Binomial name
- Perdita gerhardi Viereck, 1904

Species of bee

Perdita gerhardi is a species of bee in the family Andrenidae. It is found in North America. It is a specialist pollinator, feeding only on Monarda punctata.

== Subspecies ==
These three subspecies belong to the species Perdita gerhardi:

- Perdita gerhardi dallasiana Cockerell, 1906
- Perdita gerhardi gerhardi
- Perdita gerhardi monardae Viereck, 1904
