= Perdita bicuspidariae =

Scientific classification
- Domain: Eukaryota
- Kingdom: Animalia
- Phylum: Arthropoda
- Class: Insecta
- Order: Hymenoptera
- Family: Andrenidae
- Subfamily: Panurginae
- Genus: Perdita
- Species: P. bicuspidariae

Binomial name
- Perdita bicuspidariae Timberlake, 1962

Species of bee

Perdita bicuspidariae is a species of bee in the family Andrenidae. It is found in Central America and North America.
