= Panurginus occidentalis =

Scientific classification
- Domain: Eukaryota
- Kingdom: Animalia
- Phylum: Arthropoda
- Class: Insecta
- Order: Hymenoptera
- Family: Andrenidae
- Subfamily: Panurginae
- Tribe: Panurgini
- Genus: Panurginus
- Species: P. occidentalis

Binomial name
- Panurginus occidentalis (Crawford, 1916)

Species of bee

Panurginus occidentalis is a species of bee in the family Andrenidae. It is found in North America.
