= Perdita koebelei =

Scientific classification
- Domain: Eukaryota
- Kingdom: Animalia
- Phylum: Arthropoda
- Class: Insecta
- Order: Hymenoptera
- Family: Andrenidae
- Subfamily: Panurginae
- Genus: Perdita
- Species: P. koebelei

Binomial name
- Perdita koebelei Timberlake, 1964

Species of bee

Perdita koebelei is a species of bee in the family Andrenidae. It is found in North America.

== Subspecies ==
These two subspecies belong to the species Perdita koebelei:

- Perdita koebelei concinna Timberlake
- Perdita koebelei koebelei Timberlake
