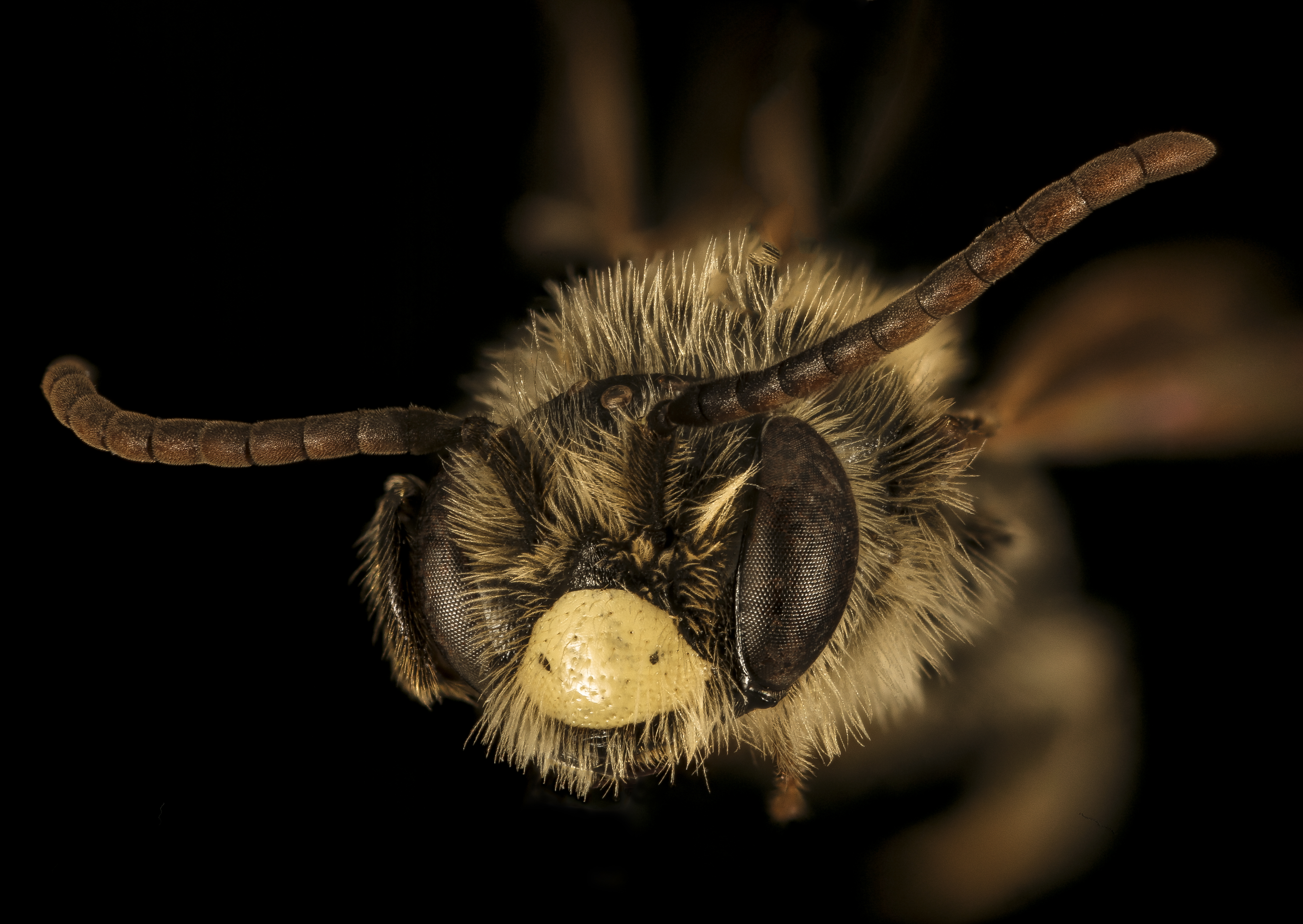

Scientific classification
- Kingdom: Animalia
- Phylum: Arthropoda
- Class: Insecta
- Order: Hymenoptera
- Family: Andrenidae
- Genus: Andrena
- Species: A. brevipalpis

Binomial name
- Andrena brevipalpis Cockerell, 1930

= Andrena brevipalpis =

Species of bee

The short-tongued miner bee (Andrena brevipalpis) is a species of miner bee in the family Andrenidae. It is found in North America. It is an oligolect of Rhus flowers.
