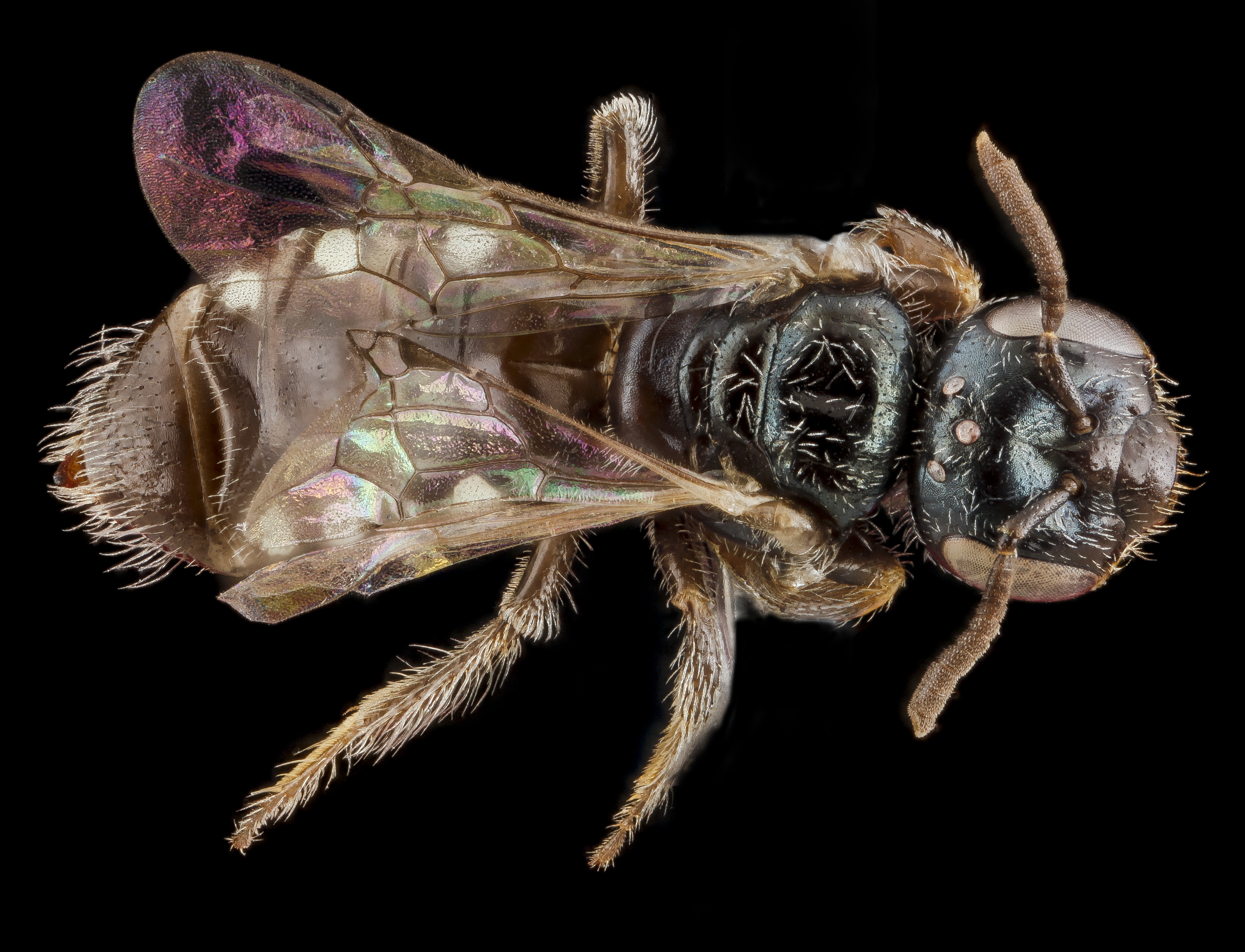

Scientific classification
- Kingdom: Animalia
- Phylum: Arthropoda
- Class: Insecta
- Order: Hymenoptera
- Family: Andrenidae
- Subfamily: Panurginae
- Genus: Perdita
- Species: P. sexmaculata

Binomial name
- Perdita sexmaculata Cockerell, 1895

= Perdita sexmaculata =

Species of bee

Perdita sexmaculata is a species of bee in the family Andrenidae. It is found in Central America and North America.

== Subspecies ==
These two subspecies belong to the species Perdita sexmaculata:

- Perdita sexmaculata octonaria Timberlake, 1962
- Perdita sexmaculata sexmaculata Cockerell, 1895
