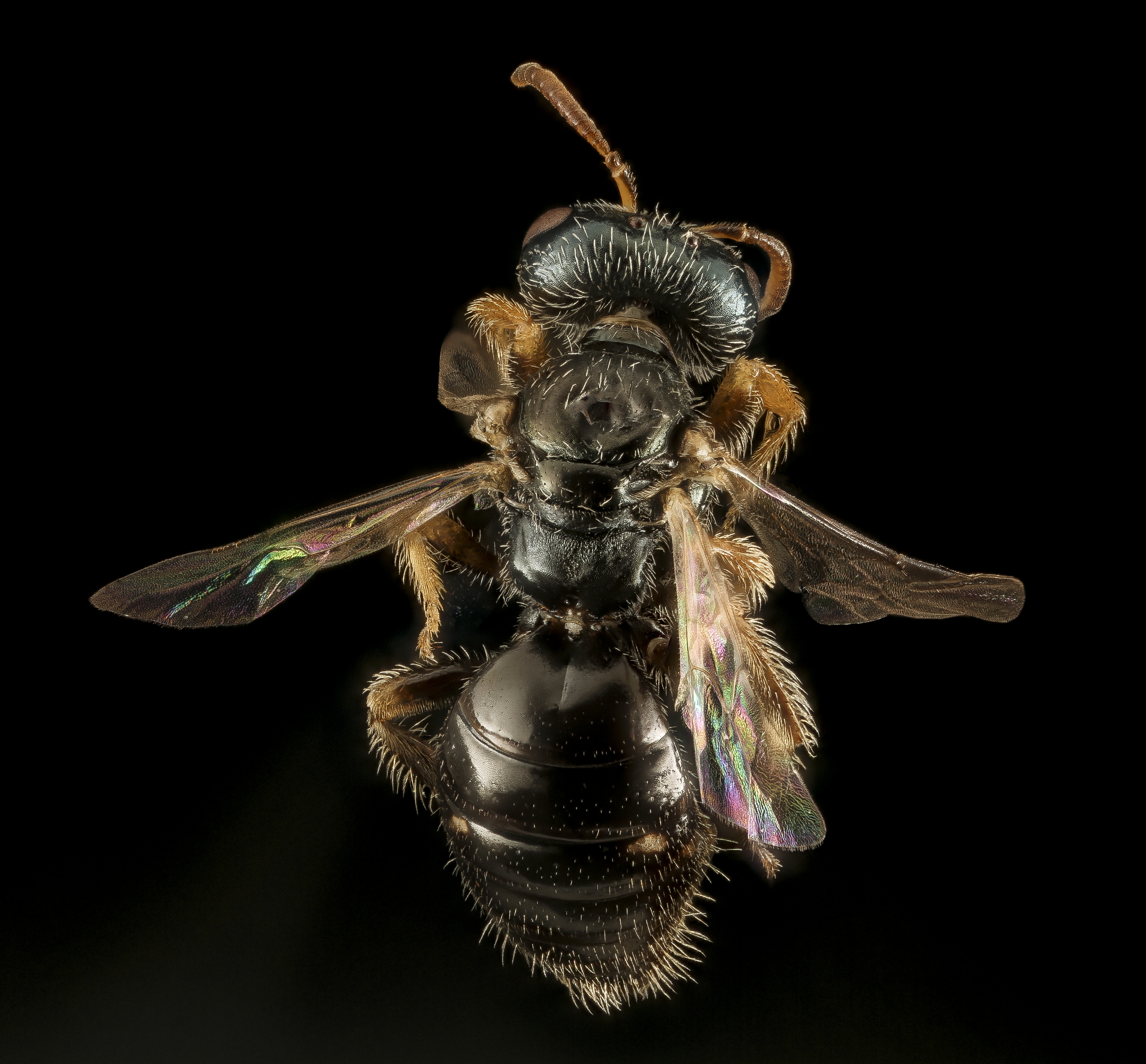

Scientific classification
- Domain: Eukaryota
- Kingdom: Animalia
- Phylum: Arthropoda
- Class: Insecta
- Order: Hymenoptera
- Family: Andrenidae
- Subfamily: Panurginae
- Genus: Perdita
- Species: P. halictoides

Binomial name
- Perdita halictoides Smith, 1853

= Perdita halictoides =

Species of bee

The sweatbee-like miner bee (Perdita halictoides) is a species of miner bee in the family Andrenidae. Another common name for this species is the ground-cherry perdita. It is found in North America.
