= Perdita scutellaris =

Scientific classification
- Domain: Eukaryota
- Kingdom: Animalia
- Phylum: Arthropoda
- Class: Insecta
- Order: Hymenoptera
- Family: Andrenidae
- Genus: Perdita
- Species: P. scutellaris

Binomial name
- Perdita scutellaris Timberlake, 1962

Species of bee

Perdita scutellaris is a bee species from California in the United States. It is only found in sand dune habitats or other sandy areas. It is oligolectic, collecting pollen only from plants in the genus Tiquilia.
