= Perdita nasuta =

Scientific classification
- Domain: Eukaryota
- Kingdom: Animalia
- Phylum: Arthropoda
- Class: Insecta
- Order: Hymenoptera
- Family: Andrenidae
- Genus: Perdita
- Species: P. nasuta

Binomial name
- Perdita nasuta Timberlake, 1962

Species of bee

Perdita nasuta is a species of miner bee in the genus Perdita. It was first described by Timberlake in 1962.
