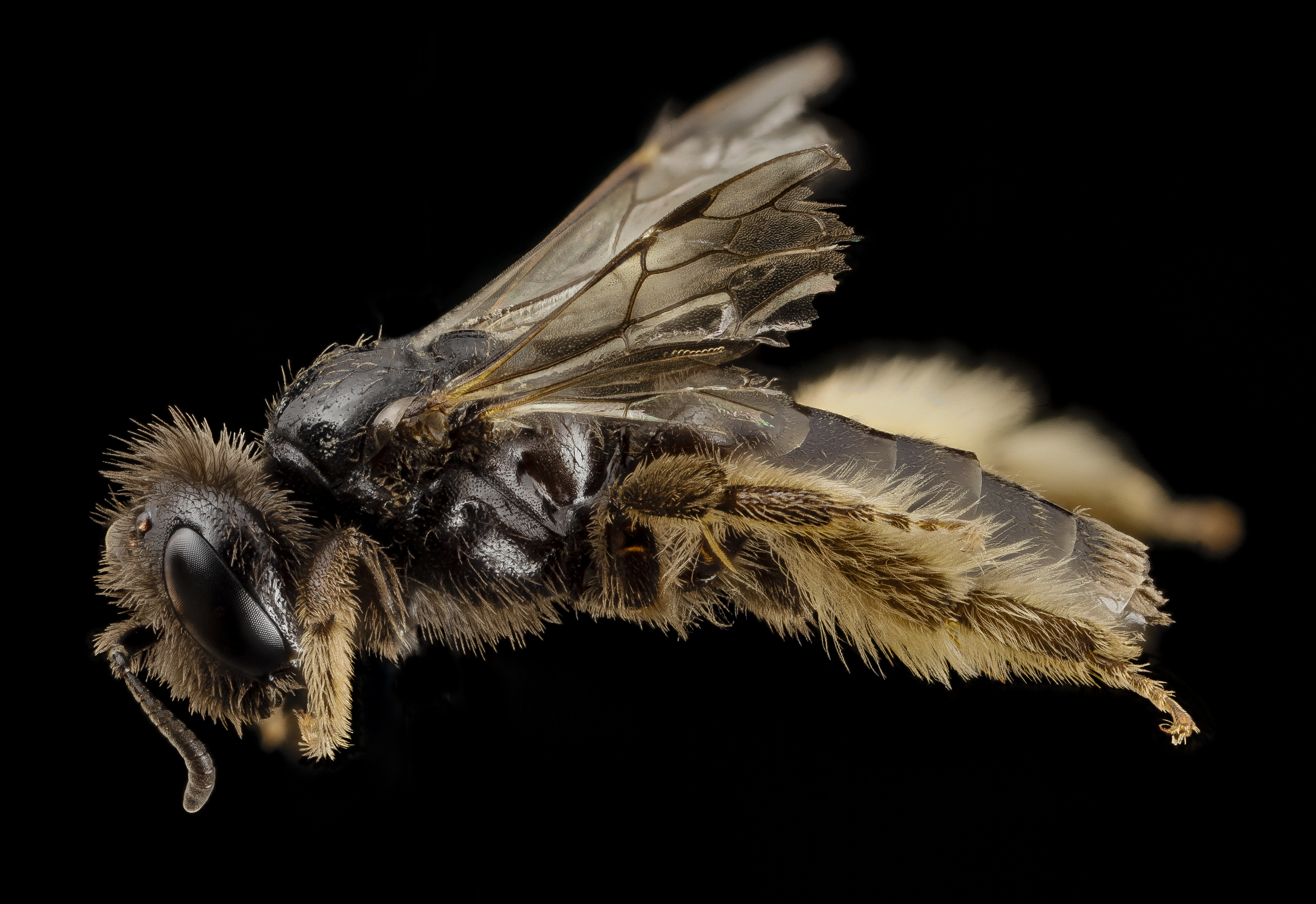
- Panurginus

Scientific classification
- Domain: Eukaryota
- Kingdom: Animalia
- Phylum: Arthropoda
- Class: Insecta
- Order: Hymenoptera
- Family: Andrenidae
- Subfamily: Panurginae
- Tribe: Panurgini

Subtribes
- Panurginina; Perditina

= Panurgini =

Tribe of bees

Panurgini is a tribe of bees in the family Andrenidae. There are about 9 genera and more than 830 described species in Panurgini.

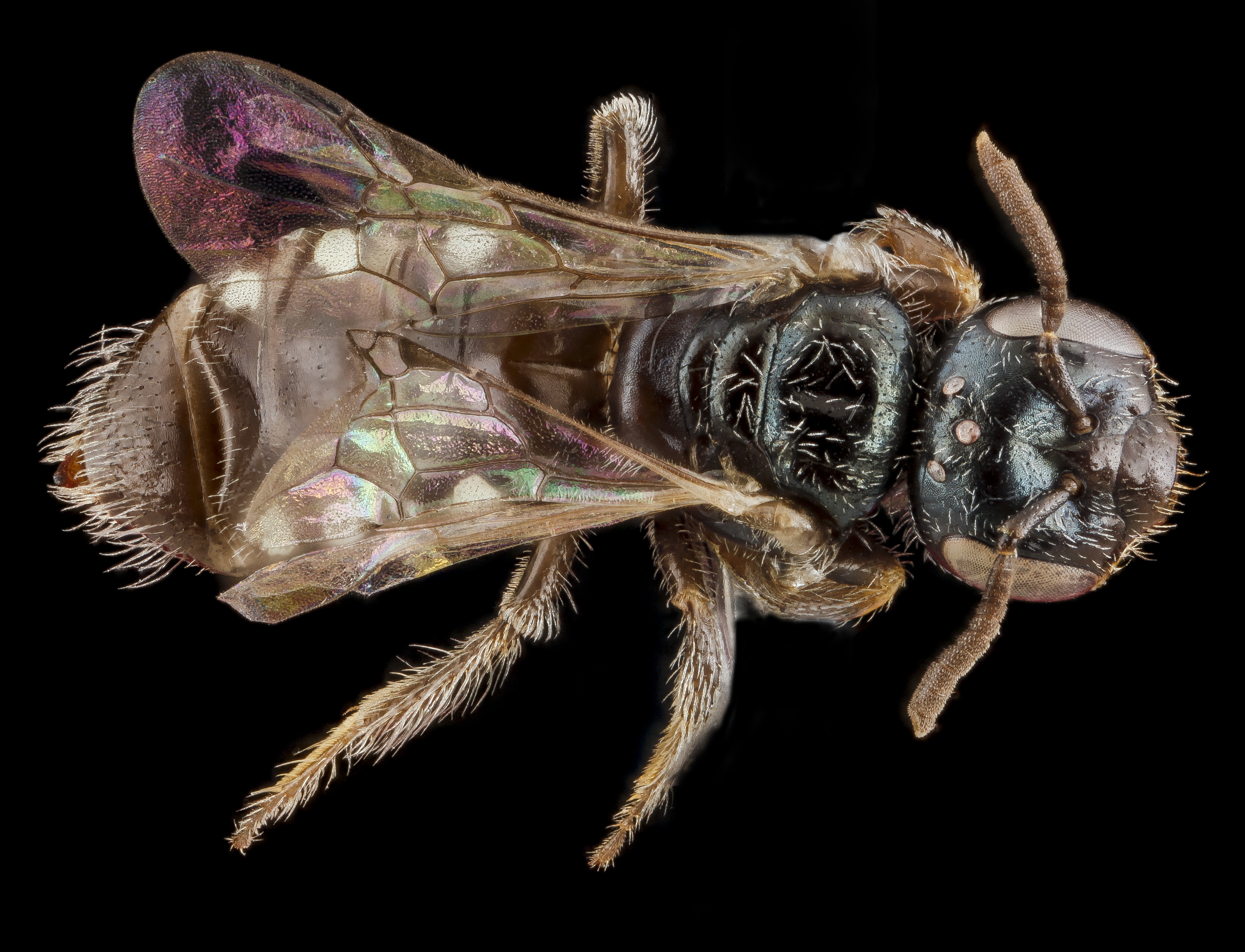
Perdita sexmaculata

== Genera ==
These nine genera belong to the tribe Panurgini:

- Avpanurgus Warncke, 1972
- Camptopoeum Spinola, 1843
- Clavipanurgus Warncke, 1972
- Flavipanurgus Warncke, 1972
- Macrotera Smith, 1853
- Panurginus Nylander, 1848
- Panurgus Panzer, 1806
- Perdita Smith, 1853
- †Simpanurgus Warncke, 1972
