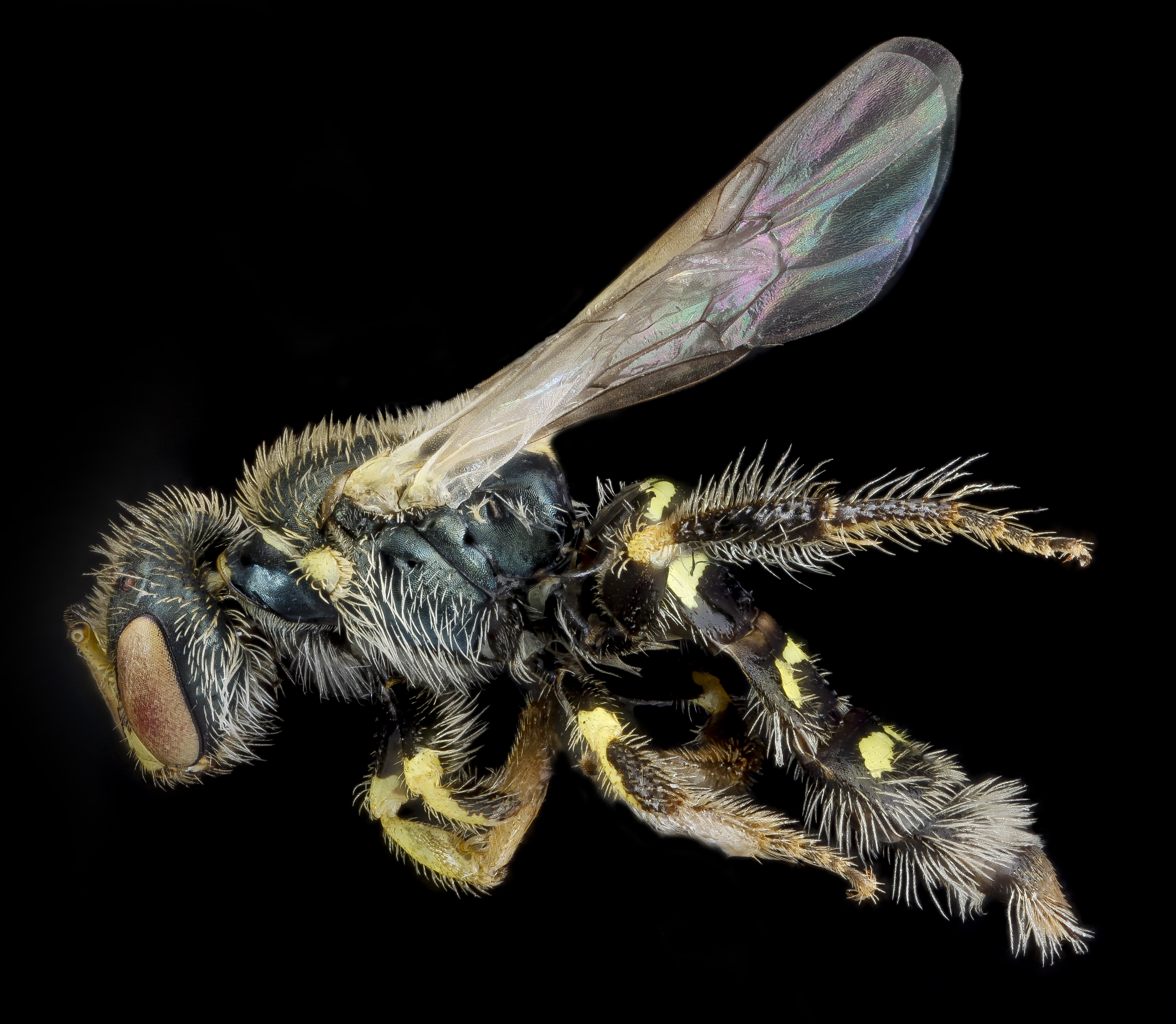

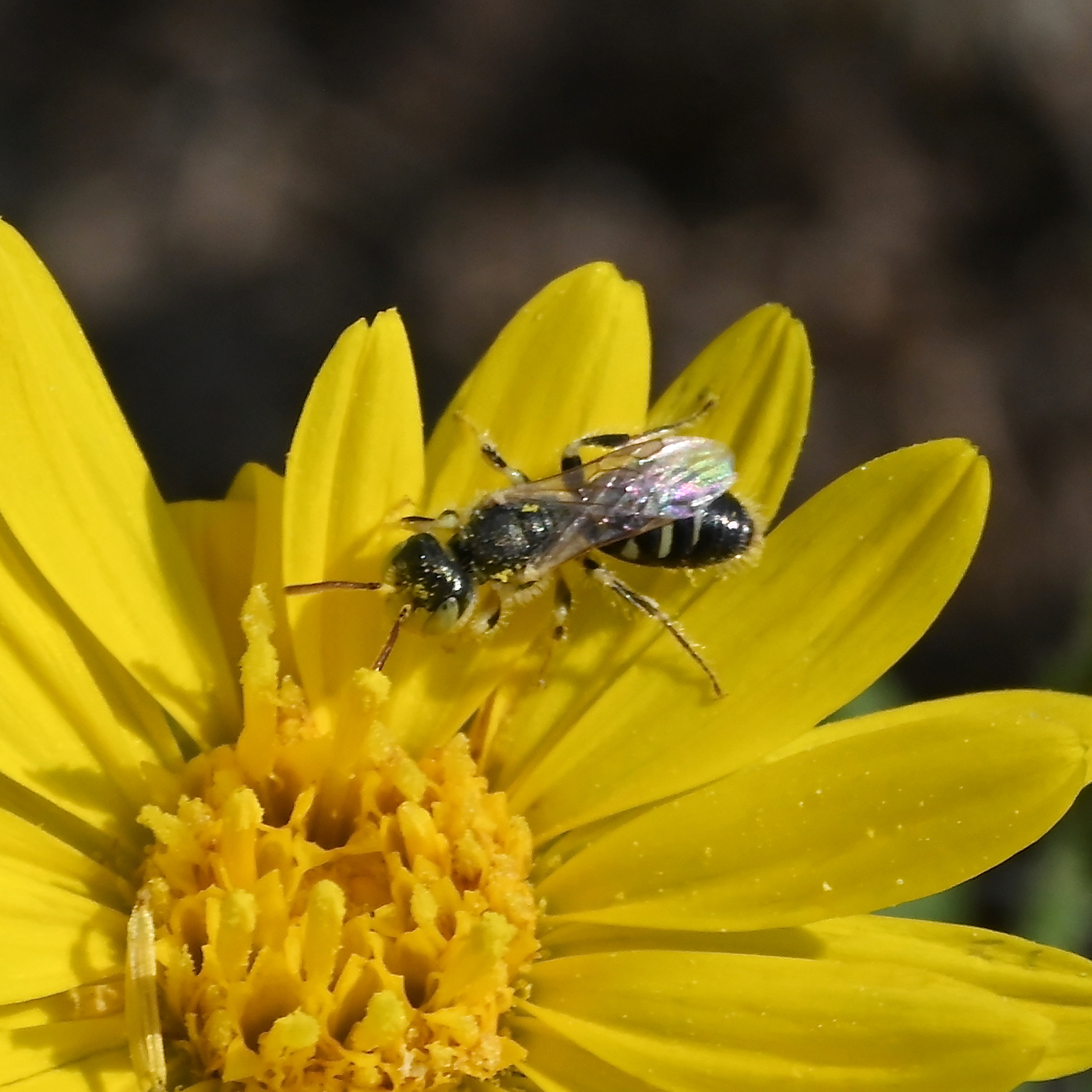

Scientific classification
- Domain: Eukaryota
- Kingdom: Animalia
- Phylum: Arthropoda
- Class: Insecta
- Order: Hymenoptera
- Family: Andrenidae
- Subfamily: Panurginae
- Genus: Perdita
- Species: P. swenki

Binomial name
- Perdita swenki Crawford, 1915

= Perdita swenki =

Species of bee

Perdita swenki is a species of bee in the family Andrenidae. It is found in North America. It is known to visit: Chrysopsis, Grindelia, Helianthus maximillianii, Liatris, Solidago juncea, and Solidago rigida.
