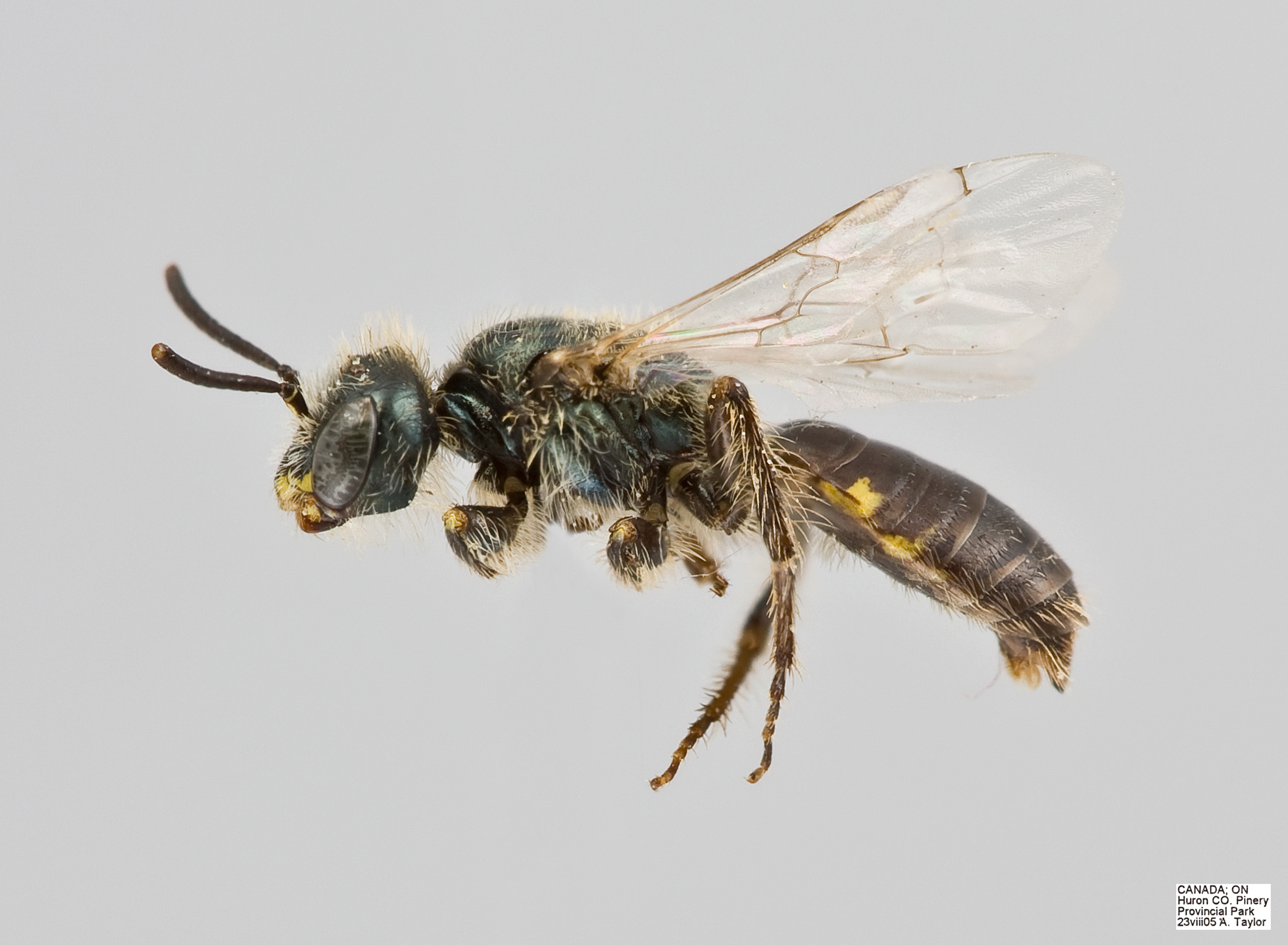
- Male Perdita bequaerti

Scientific classification
- Domain: Eukaryota
- Kingdom: Animalia
- Phylum: Arthropoda
- Class: Insecta
- Order: Hymenoptera
- Family: Andrenidae
- Subfamily: Panurginae
- Genus: Perdita
- Species: P. bequaerti

Binomial name
- Perdita bequaerti Viereck, 1917

= Perdita bequaerti =

Species of bee

The Bequaert's miner bee (Perdita bequaerti) is a species of miner bee in the family Andrenidae. Another common name for this species is the Bequaert's perdita. It is found in North America.

== Subspecies ==
These two subspecies belong to the species Perdita bequaerti:

- Perdita bequaerti bequaerti
- Perdita bequaerti indianensis Cockerell, 1922
