= Perdita punctosignata =

Scientific classification
- Kingdom: Animalia
- Phylum: Arthropoda
- Clade: Pancrustacea
- Class: Insecta
- Order: Hymenoptera
- Family: Andrenidae
- Subfamily: Panurginae
- Genus: Perdita
- Species: P. punctosignata

Binomial name
- Perdita punctosignata Cockerell, 1895

Species of bee

Perdita punctosignata is a species of bee in the family Andrenidae. It is found in Central America and North America.

== Subspecies ==
There are three subspecies recognised:

- Perdita punctosignata flava Timberlake, 1964
- Perdita punctosignata punctosignata
- Perdita punctosignata sulphurea Timberlake, 1964
