= Perdita perpallida =

Scientific classification
- Kingdom: Animalia
- Phylum: Arthropoda
- Class: Insecta
- Order: Hymenoptera
- Family: Andrenidae
- Subfamily: Panurginae
- Genus: Perdita
- Species: P. perpallida

Binomial name
- Perdita perpallida Cockerell, 1901

Species of bee

The pale miner bee (Perdita perpallida) is a species of miner bee in the family Andrenidae. It is found in North America. The species is distinctive for its pale yellow or white coloration.

== Subspecies ==
Perdita perpallida was formerly divided into two subspecies, but the subspecies Perdita perpallida citrinella Graenicher, 1910 was found to be the result of color variation and was synonymized with P. perpallida in 2023.
