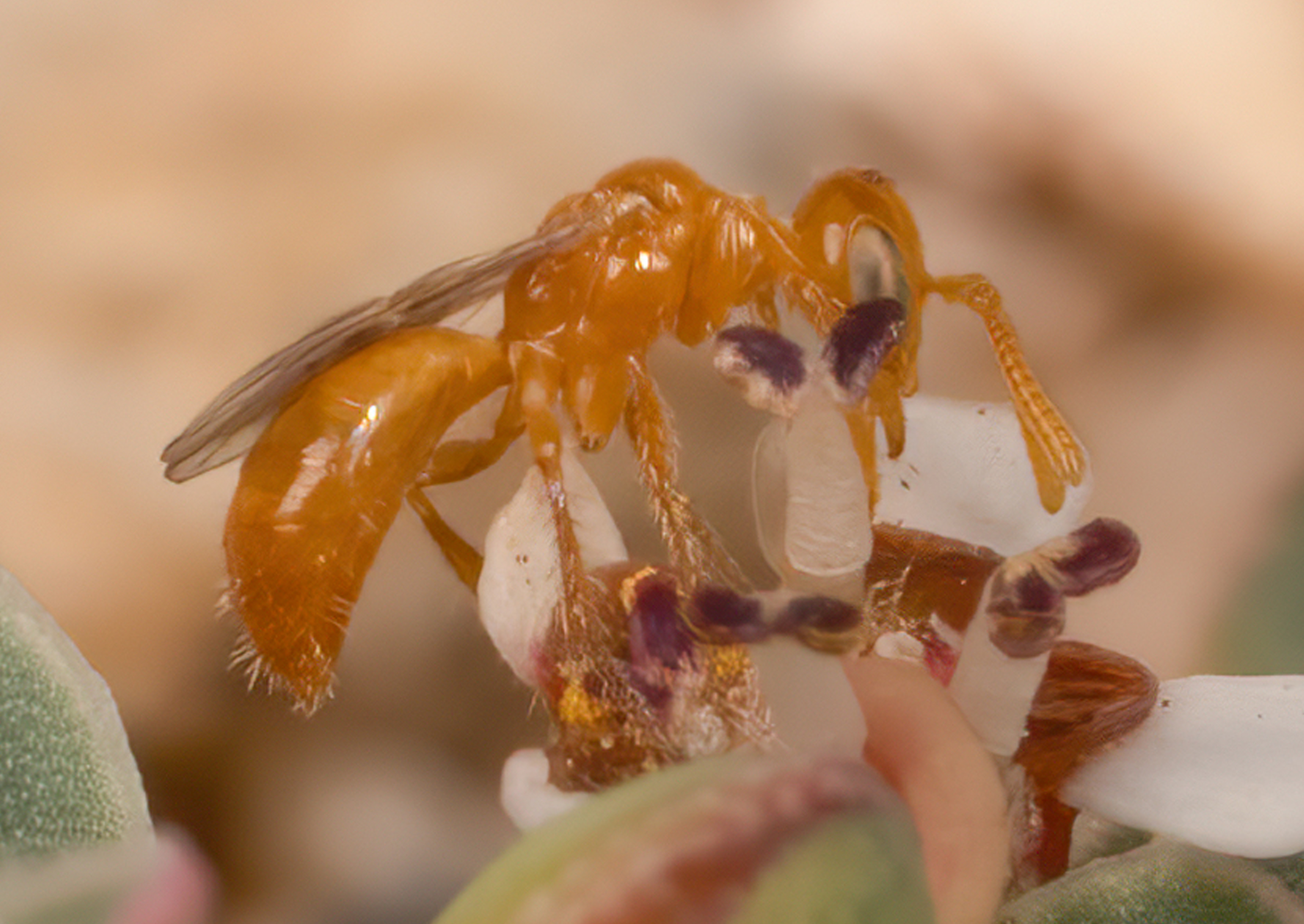

Scientific classification
- Kingdom: Animalia
- Phylum: Arthropoda
- Class: Insecta
- Order: Hymenoptera
- Family: Andrenidae
- Subfamily: Panurginae
- Genus: Perdita
- Species: P. minima

Binomial name
- Perdita minima Cockerell, 1923

= Perdita minima =

Species of bee

Perdita minima is a species of mining bee in the family Andrenidae. It is the smallest known species of bee, just under 2 mm long and weighing about 0.33 mg.

This solitary bee is found in North America, specifically in the southwestern US, and often inhabits desert areas. It builds small nests in sandy soils. It feeds on and pollinates a variety of plants, including spurges.
