= Perdita pelargoides =

Scientific classification
- Kingdom: Animalia
- Phylum: Arthropoda
- Class: Insecta
- Order: Hymenoptera
- Family: Andrenidae
- Subfamily: Panurginae
- Genus: Perdita
- Species: P. pelargoides

Binomial name
- Perdita pelargoides (Cockerell, 1916)

Species of bee

Perdita pelargoides is a species of bee in the family Andrenidae. It is found in North America.
