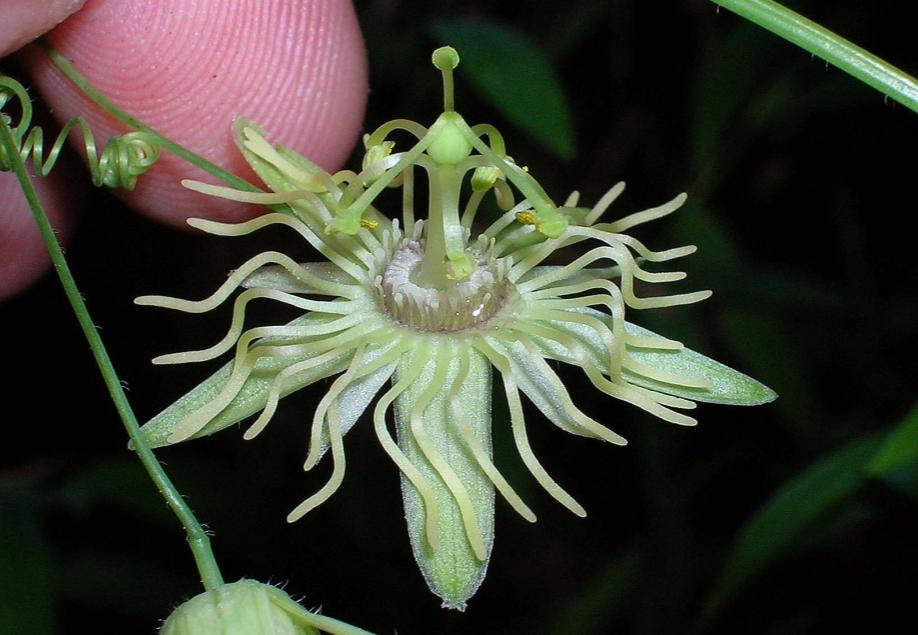
- Flower

Conservation status
- Secure (NatureServe)

Scientific classification
- Kingdom: Plantae
- Clade: Tracheophytes
- Clade: Angiosperms
- Clade: Eudicots
- Clade: Rosids
- Order: Malpighiales
- Family: Passifloraceae
- Genus: Passiflora
- Species: P. lutea

Binomial name
- Passiflora lutea L.

= Passiflora lutea =

Species of vine

Passiflora lutea, commonly known as yellow passionflower, is a flowering perennial vine in the family Passifloraceae, native to the central and eastern United States. The vine has three-lobed leaves and small, yellowish-green, fringed flowers that appear in the summer, followed by green fruit that turn almost black at maturity. It grows in moist to wet habitats.

It is also a host plant for the passionflower flea beetle (Disonycha discoidea).

== Description ==
P. lutea is a perennial, herbaceous, climbing or trailing, unbranched vine that can reach 3–5 m (10–16 ft) in length. Curled, springlike tendrils emerging from leaf axils help the vine to climb on structures or other vegetation. The leaves are trilobed, 3–7 cm (1–3 in) long and 3–15 cm (1–6 in) broad, with a 5 cm (2 in) petiole. Leaves have smooth (entire) margins and are alternate on the stem. The upper surface of the leaves is dark green, and may be mottled with splotches of lighter green. In the north of its range, it is deciduous.

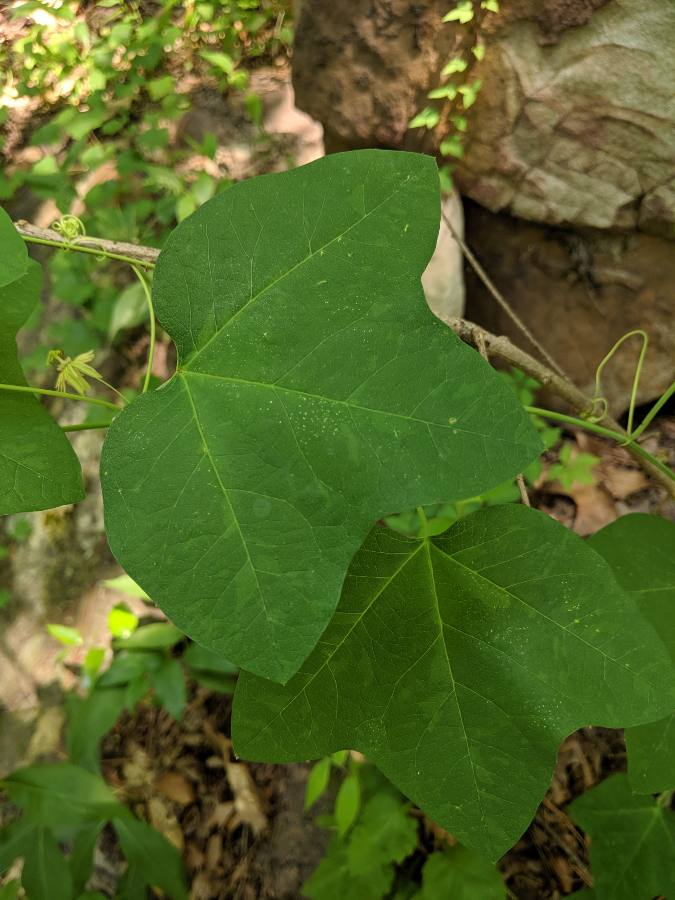
Leaf

The showy flowers appear singly or in pairs on slender flower stalks up to 5 cm (2 in) long. Each flower is 1.5–2.5 cm (0.6–1.0 in) wide with narrow yellowish greenish petals and broader green sepals. The fruit is up to 1.5 cm (0.6 in) long and green, turning dark purple or black when ripe. Each fruit contains up to 10 seeds, which are brown, pointed at each end, and have a textured surface.

=== Similar species ===
P. lutea is very similar to Passiflora suberosa (corkystem passionflower), differentiated by the leaves, which are more variable and generally have deeper lobes in P. suberosa, and the stems, which are corky or winged in P. suberosa. Also, P. suberosa has a more limited range, occurring in Texas and Florida and parts of Latin America. Another similar species is Menispermum canadense (Canadian moonflower), whose leaves are a different shape, with three to seven lobes instead of just three. Also, the fruit of M. canadense grows in clusters and each berry has a single crescent shaped seed.

== Etymology ==
The genus name Passiflora comes from the Italian word "passio", or suffering, based on an association of the flower parts to the crucifixion of Jesus Christ. The species name luteo is from the Latin word for "yellow", due to the color of the flowers.

== Distribution and habitat ==
P. lutea is native in the United States from Pennsylvania west to Kansas, and south to Florida and Texas. It is the northernmost species of Passiflora, occurring slightly further north than P. incarnata, and tolerant of winter temperatures down to −15 °C, and even −30 °C for short periods.

P. lutea grows in bright shade to sunny places with moist, rich soil, such as open woodlands and low alluvial ground.

== Conservation ==
Passiflora lutea is considered an endangered species in Pennsylvania.

== Ecology ==
Yellow passionflower is often good for butterfly gardens, as it is a host for Julia (Dryas iulia), Mexican & Gulf fritillaries butterflies, zebra longwings (Heliconius charitonius) & Crimson-patched longwing (Heliconius erato) butterflies. It is also the only pollen source used by an unusual specialist bee, Anthemurgus passiflorae, which is the sole member of its genus; this rare bee is unusual in that despite its obligate relationship with the plant (oligolecty), it rarely pollinates it.
