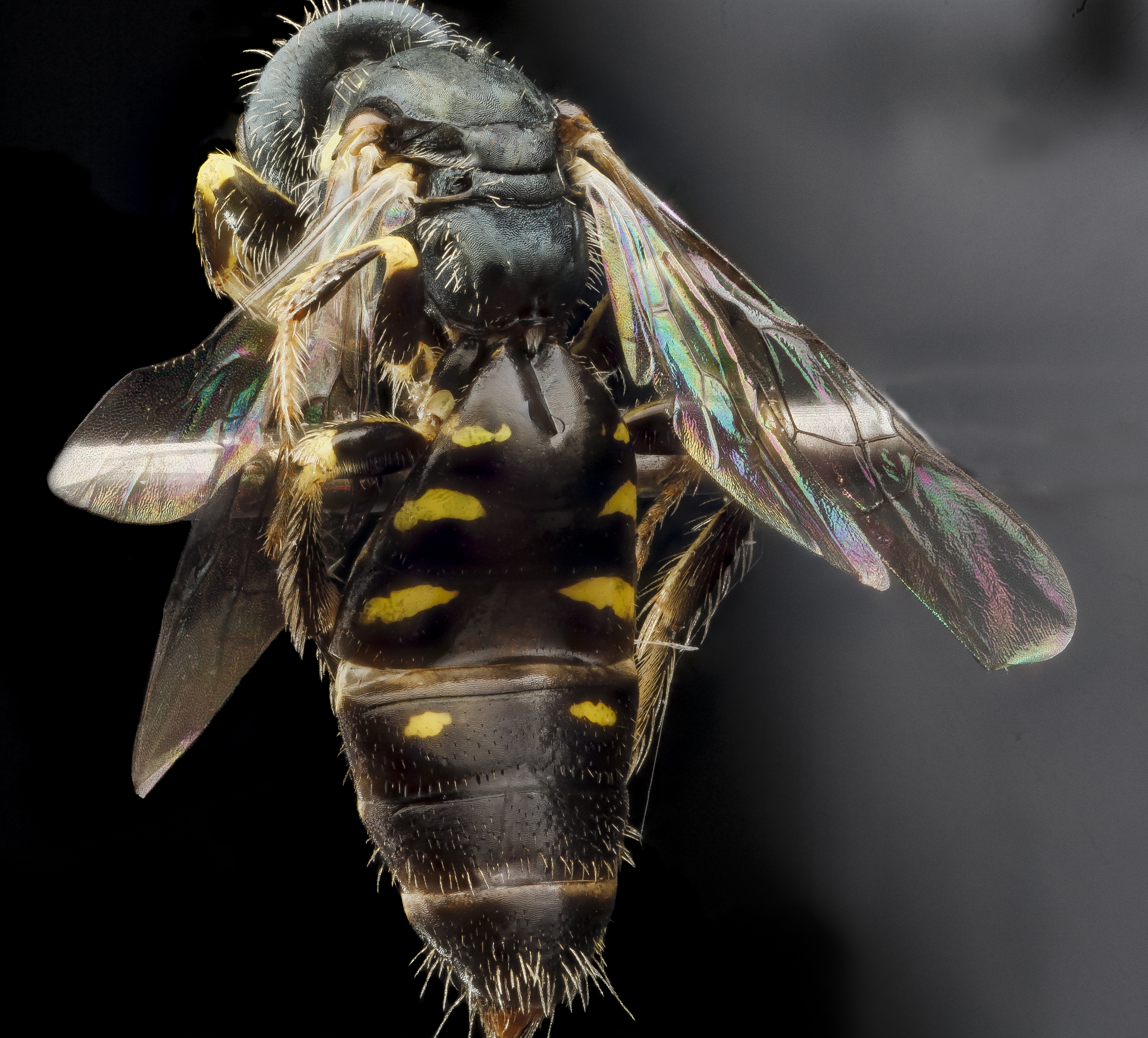

Scientific classification
- Domain: Eukaryota
- Kingdom: Animalia
- Phylum: Arthropoda
- Class: Insecta
- Order: Hymenoptera
- Family: Andrenidae
- Genus: Perdita
- Species: P. octomaculata

Binomial name
- Perdita octomaculata (Say, 1824)

= Perdita octomaculata =

Species of bee

The eight-spotted miner bee (Perdita octomaculata) is a species of miner bee in the family Andrenidae. Another common name for this species is the eight-spotted perdita. It is found in North America.

== Subspecies ==
These two subspecies belong to the species Perdita octomaculata:

- Perdita octomaculata octomaculata
- Perdita octomaculata terminata Cockerell, 1922-28
