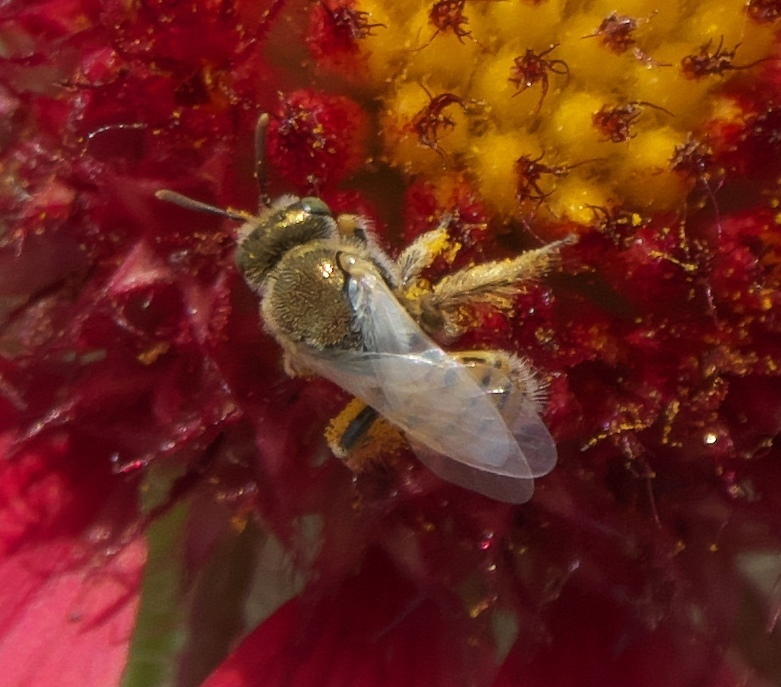
- Perdita coreopsidis, Oklahoma

Scientific classification
- Kingdom: Animalia
- Phylum: Arthropoda
- Class: Insecta
- Order: Hymenoptera
- Family: Andrenidae
- Genus: Perdita
- Species: P. coreopsidis

Binomial name
- Perdita coreopsidis Cockerell, 1906

= Perdita coreopsidis =

Species of bee

Perdita coreopsidis is a species of bee in the family Andrenidae. It is found in Central America and North America.

== Subspecies ==
These four subspecies belong to the species Perdita coreopsidis:

- Perdita coreopsidis collaris Cockerell, 1916
- Perdita coreopsidis coreopsidis
- Perdita coreopsidis kansensis Timberlake, 1953
- Perdita coreopsidis obscurior Timberlake, 1953
