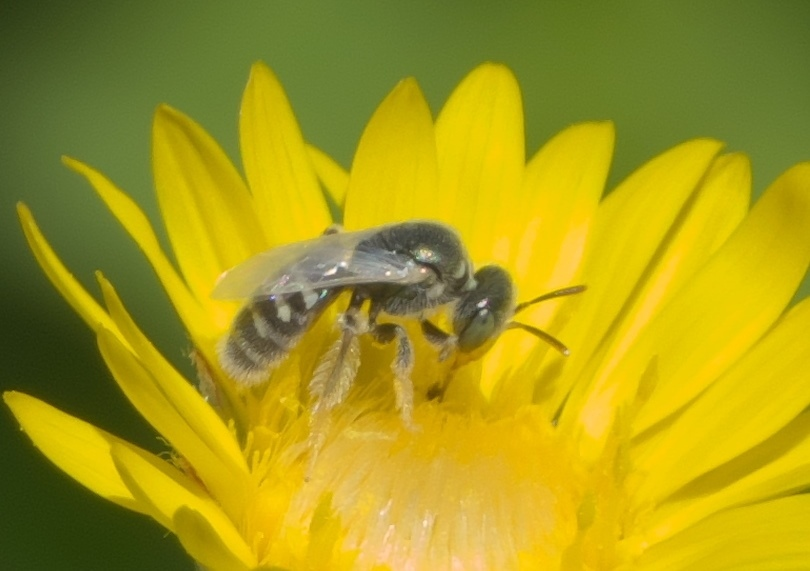
- Perdita albipennis, Kansas

Scientific classification
- Domain: Eukaryota
- Kingdom: Animalia
- Phylum: Arthropoda
- Class: Insecta
- Order: Hymenoptera
- Family: Andrenidae
- Genus: Perdita
- Species: P. albipennis

Binomial name
- Perdita albipennis Cresson, 1868

Synonyms
- Perdita hyalina Cresson, 1878; Perdita lacteipennis Swenk and Cockerell, 1907

= Perdita albipennis =

Species of bee

The shiny green miner bee (Perdita albipennis) is a species of miner bee in the family Andrenidae. Another common name for this species is the white-winged perdita. It is found in Central America and North America.

== Subspecies ==
These three subspecies belong to the species Perdita albipennis:

- Perdita albipennis albipennis
- Perdita albipennis canadensis Crawford, 1912
- Perdita albipennis mut Cockerell
