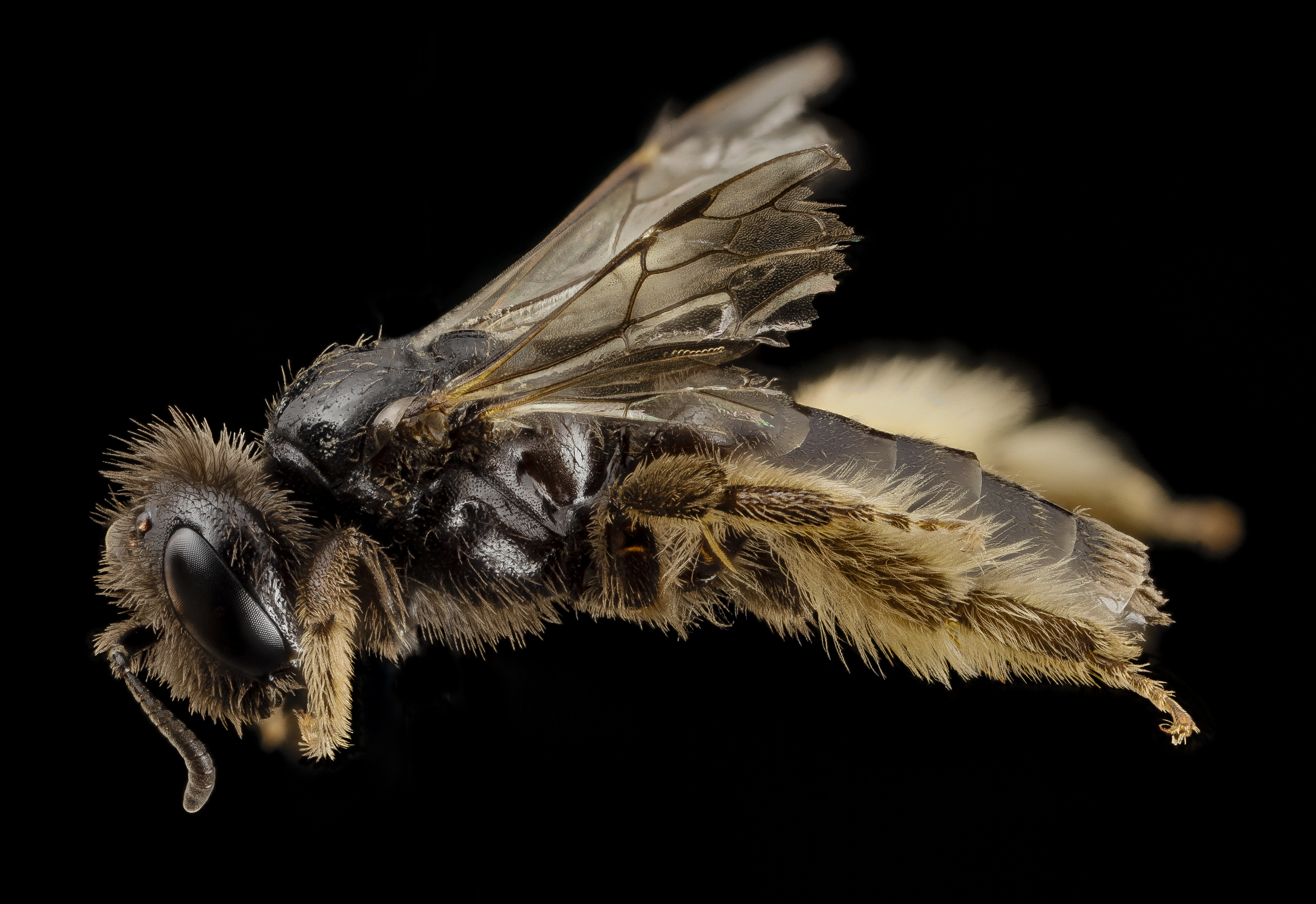

Scientific classification
- Domain: Eukaryota
- Kingdom: Animalia
- Phylum: Arthropoda
- Class: Insecta
- Order: Hymenoptera
- Family: Andrenidae
- Subfamily: Panurginae
- Tribe: Panurgini
- Genus: Panurginus; Nylander, 1848

= Panurginus =

Genus of bees

Panurginus is a genus of bees in the family Andrenidae. There are more than 50 described species in Panurginus.

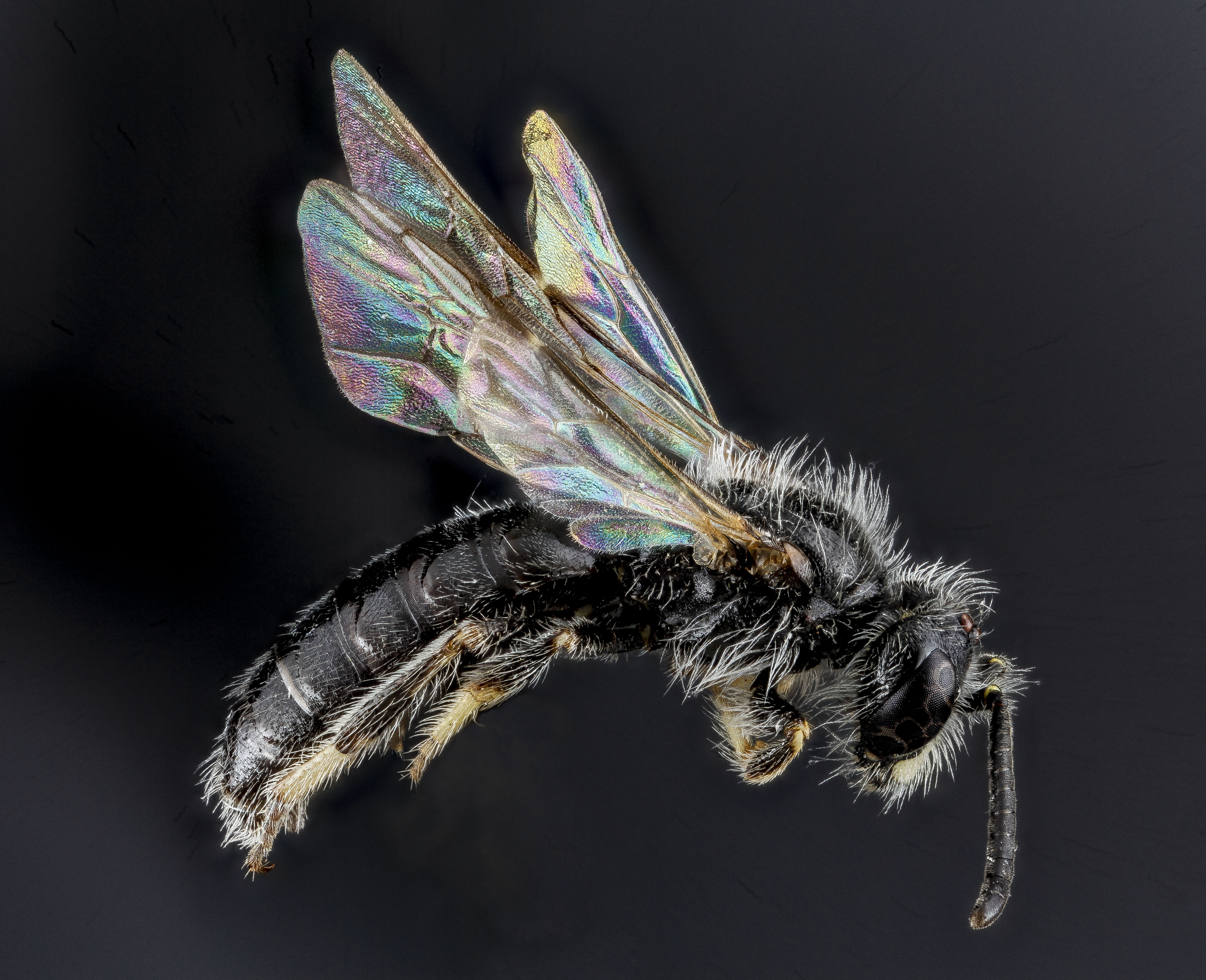

== Species ==
These 55 species belong to the genus Panurginus:

- Panurginus albitarsis
- Panurginus albopilosus Lucas, 1846
- Panurginus alpinus Warncke, 1972
- Panurginus alpotanini Romankova & Astafurova, 2011-29
- Panurginus alticolus Morawitz, 1876
- Panurginus annulatus Sichel, 1859
- Panurginus armaticeps Cockerell, 1916
- Panurginus arsenievi Romankova & Astafurova, 2011-29
- Panurginus atramontensis Crawford, 1926
- Panurginus atriceps Cresson, 1878 - black-tipped miner bee
- Panurginus barletae Patiny, 2002
- Panurginus beardsleyi Cockerell, 1904 - Beardsley's miner bee
- Panurginus bilobatus Michener, 1937
- Panurginus brullei Lepeletier, 1841
- Panurginus ceanothi Michener, 1935
- Panurginus clarus Warncke, 1987
- Panurginus corpanus Warncke, 1972
- Panurginus crawfordi Cockerell, 1914
- Panurginus cressoniellus Cockerell, 1898 - Cresson's miner bee
- Panurginus emarginatus Michener, 1935
- Panurginus flavipes Morawitz, 1895
- Panurginus flavotarsus Wu, 1992
- Panurginus gabrielis Michener, 1935
- Panurginus gracilis Michener, 1935
- Panurginus herzi Morawitz, 1892
- Panurginus ineptus Cockerell, 1922 - inept miner bee
- Panurginus kozlovi Romankova & Astafurova, 2011-29
- Panurginus kropotkini Romankova & Astafurova, 2011-29
- Panurginus labiatus Eversmann, 1852
- Panurginus lactipennis Friese, 1897
- Panurginus maritimus Michener, 1935
- Panurginus melanocephalus Cockerell, 1926
- Panurginus mikhno Romankova & Astafurova, 2011-29
- Panurginus minutulus Warncke, 1987
- Panurginus montanus Giraud, 1861
- Panurginus morawitzii Friese, 1897
- Panurginus muraviovi Romankova & Astafurova, 2011-29
- Panurginus niger Nylander, 1848
- Panurginus nigrellus Crawford, 1926
- Panurginus nigrihirtus Michener, 1935
- Panurginus nigripes Morawitz, 1880
- Panurginus obruchevi Romankova & Astafurova, 2011-29
- Panurginus occidentalis Crawford, 1916
- Panurginus picipes Morawitz, 1890
- Panurginus picitarsis Cockerell, 1912-01
- Panurginus polytrichus Cockerell, 1909
- Panurginus ponticus Warncke, 1972
- Panurginus potentillae Crawford, 1916
- Panurginus romani Aurivillius, 1914
- Panurginus schwarzi Warncke, 1972
- Panurginus semiopacus Morawitz, 1895
- Panurginus sericatus Warncke, 1972
- Panurginus tunensis Warncke, 1972
- Panurginus turcomanicus Popov, 1936
- Panurginus tyrolensis Richards, 1932
