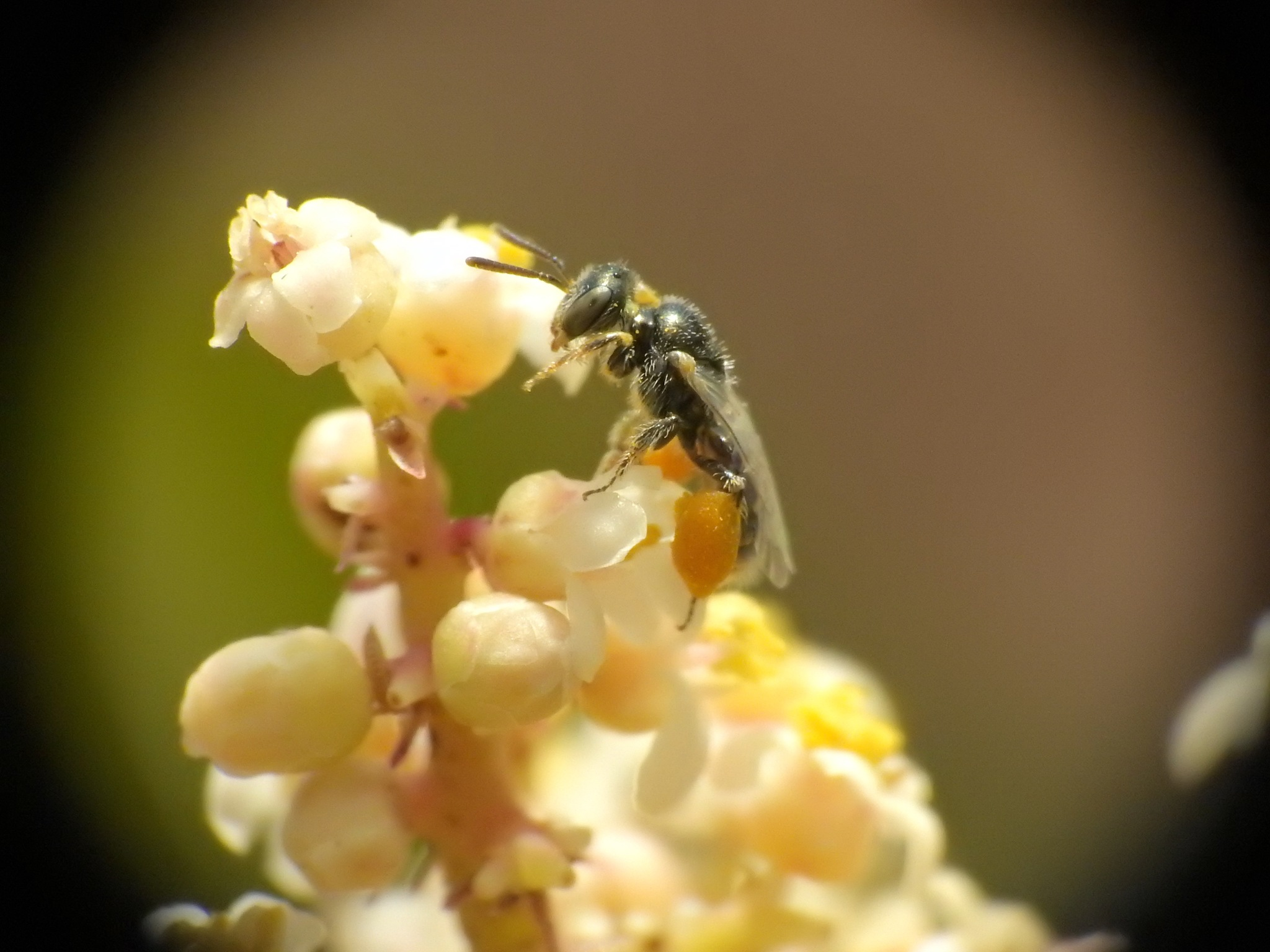

Scientific classification
- Kingdom: Animalia
- Phylum: Arthropoda
- Clade: Pancrustacea
- Class: Insecta
- Order: Hymenoptera
- Family: Andrenidae
- Genus: Perdita
- Species: P. rhois

Binomial name
- Perdita rhois Cockerell, 1901

= Perdita rhois =

Species of bee

Perdita rhois is a species of bee in the family Andrenidae (mining bees), commonly known as the Rhus fairy bee.

== Description ==
Like other members of genus Perdita, Rhus fairy bees are very small and often mistaken for gnats. Adult bees range from 2–10 mm (0.08–0.39 in) in body length. Male and female adult bees differ in coloration: female bees are mostly black with black eyes, while males are yellow with black markings and green eyes. Both have translucent white wings.

== Taxonomy ==
P. rhois was named by Theodore D. A. Cockerell in 1901. The species name "rhois" refers to the laurel sumac plant (Malosma laurina) whose scientific name in 1901 was Rhus laurina. Laurel sumac flowers are a favorite nectar and pollen source for the Rhus fairy bee.

== Distribution ==
The Rhus fairy bee is found in Central America and North America.

== Behavior ==
Unlike a substantial proportion of fairy bees, P. rhois visits flowers of many plant species. Preferred inflorescences often resemble those of laurel sumac, bearing clusters of small, white flowers.

P. rhois builds nests in the soil as is typical of mining bees.

== Influence on Modern Entomology ==
In a 2015 interview with the journal Nature, American entomologist Charles Duncan Michener cited P. rhois as the insect that first incited his interest in studying bees.
