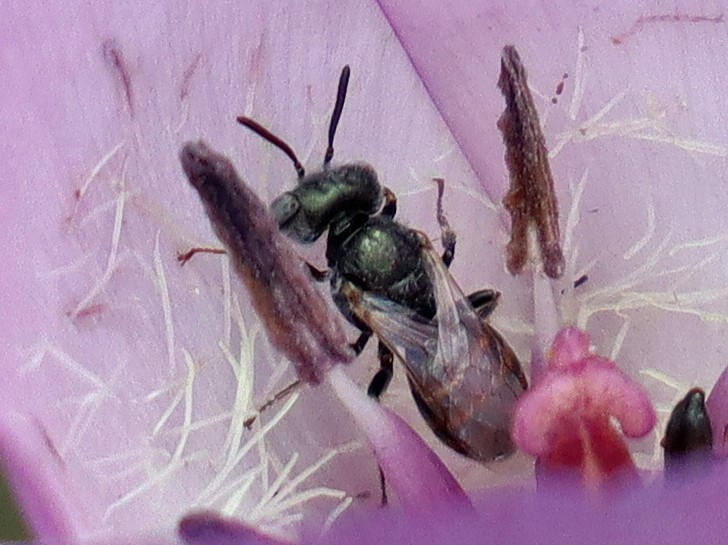

Scientific classification
- Domain: Eukaryota
- Kingdom: Animalia
- Phylum: Arthropoda
- Class: Insecta
- Order: Hymenoptera
- Family: Andrenidae
- Genus: Perdita
- Species: P. californica

Binomial name
- Perdita californica (Cresson, 1878)

= Perdita californica =

Species of bee

Perdita californica is a species of bee in the family Andrenidae. It is found in California and Baja California.

== Subspecies ==
Two subspecies are recognised:

- Perdita californica californica (Cresson, 1878)
- Perdita californica inopina Timberlake, 1968
