= Perdita kiowi =

Scientific classification
- Domain: Eukaryota
- Kingdom: Animalia
- Phylum: Arthropoda
- Class: Insecta
- Order: Hymenoptera
- Family: Andrenidae
- Genus: Perdita
- Species: P. kiowi

Binomial name
- Perdita kiowi Griswold, 1988

Species of bee

Perdita kiowi is a species of mining bee in the family Andrenidae. It is found in North America.
