= Perdita rivalis =

Scientific classification
- Domain: Eukaryota
- Kingdom: Animalia
- Phylum: Arthropoda
- Class: Insecta
- Order: Hymenoptera
- Family: Andrenidae
- Genus: Perdita
- Species: P. rivalis

Binomial name
- Perdita rivalis Timberlake, 1958

Species of bee

Perdita rivalis is a species of mining bee in the family Andrenidae. It is found in North America.
