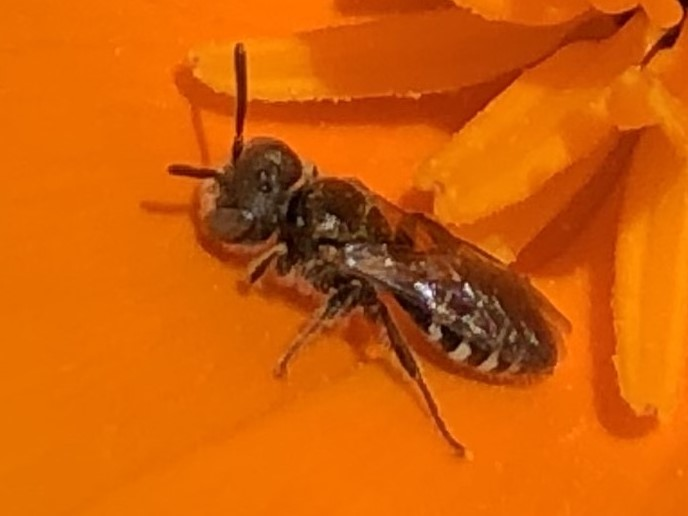

Scientific classification
- Domain: Eukaryota
- Kingdom: Animalia
- Phylum: Arthropoda
- Class: Insecta
- Order: Hymenoptera
- Family: Andrenidae
- Genus: Perdita
- Species: P. interrupta

Binomial name
- Perdita interrupta Cresson, 1878

= Perdita interrupta =

Species of bee

Perdita interrupta is a species of bee in the family Andrenidae. It is found in North America.

== Subspecies ==
These three subspecies belong to the species Perdita interrupta:

- Perdita interrupta interrupta
- Perdita interrupta kernensis Timberlake, 1956
- Perdita interrupta vernalis Timberlake, 1956
