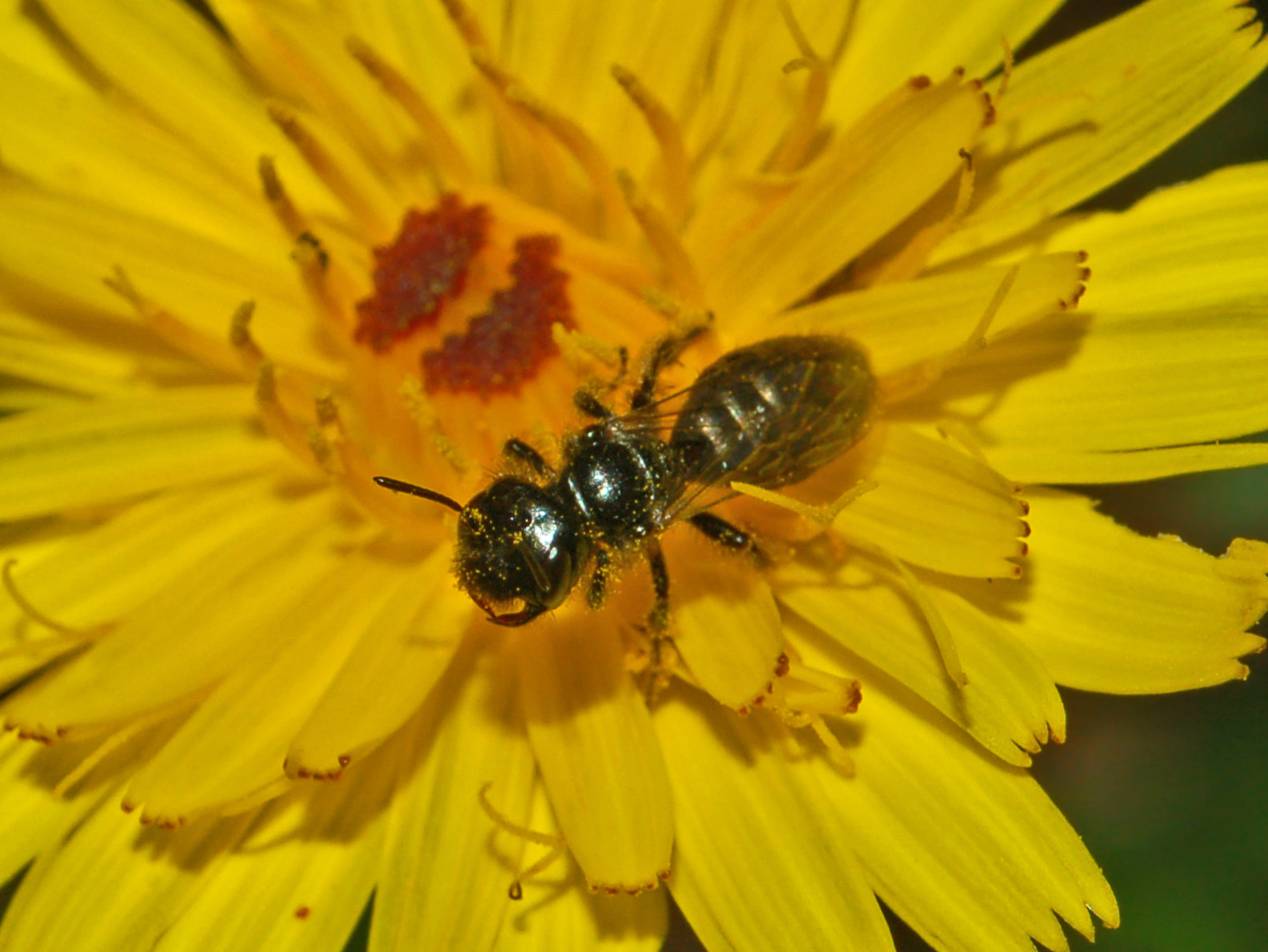
- Panurgus sp.

Scientific classification
- Domain: Eukaryota
- Kingdom: Animalia
- Phylum: Arthropoda
- Class: Insecta
- Order: Hymenoptera
- Family: Andrenidae
- Subfamily: Panurginae
- Genus: Panurgus; Panzer 1806

Synonyms
- Eriops Klug, 1807; Eryops Latreille, 1811; Panurgus (Euryvalvus) Patiny, 1999; Panurgus (Micropanurgus) Patiny, 2002; Panurgus (Pachycephalopanurgus) Patiny, 1999; Panurgus (Stenostylus) Patiny, 1999

= Panurgus =

Genus of mining bees

Panurgus is a genus of mining bees belonging to the family Andrenidae, subfamily Panurginae.

== Description ==
Panurgus species are small to medium in size, reaching 5–14 millimetres (0.20–0.55 in). Most species (subgenus Panurgus s.str.) are almost entirely black. The hair is relatively sparse, but the male has a thick, long, black facial hair. The body surface area largely bald and shiny. The abdomen has a typical, slightly diamond-shaped outline.

Panurgus have one generation per year, adults can be found especially in late Summer. They are dependent on Asteraceae as a pollen source and they prefers yellow flowers. The nests are laid in sandy soil or loess.

== Distribution ==
These bees are confined entirely to the Palearctic realm, the range extends from the Canary Islands to China and Japan.

== Species ==
Subgenus Flavipanurgus Warncke, 1972

- Panurgus flavus Friese, 1897
- Panurgus fuzetus Patiny, 1999
- Panurgus granadensis Warncke, 1987
- Panurgus ibericus Warncke, 1972
- Panurgus merceti Vachal, 1910
- Panurgus venustus Erichson, 1835

Subgenus Panurgus Panzer, 1806

- Panurgus banksianus (Kirby, 1802)
- Panurgus calcaratus (Scopoli, 1763)

Subgenus Simpanurgus Warncke, 1972

- Panurgus acutus Patiny, 2002
- Panurgus afghanensis Warncke, 1972
- Panurgus annulipes (Lucas, 1846)
- Panurgus arctos (Erichson, 1806)
- Panurgus avarus Warncke, 1972
- Panurgus buteus Warncke, 1972
- Panurgus calceatus Pérez, 1895
- Panurgus canarius Warncke, 1972
- Panurgus canescens Latreille, 1811
- Panurgus canohirtus Friese, 1922
- Panurgus catulus Warncke, 1972
- Panurgus cavannae Gribodo, 1880
- Panurgus cephalotes Latreille, 1811
- Panurgus convergens Pérez, 1895
- Panurgus corsicus Warncke, 1972
- Panurgus cyrenaikensis Warncke, 1972
- Panurgus dargius Warncke, 1972
- Panurgus dentatus Friese, 1901
- Panurgus dentipes Latreille, 1811
- Panurgus farinosus Warncke, 1972
- Panurgus friesei Mocsary, 1894
- Panurgus intermedius Rozen, 1971
- Panurgus maroccanus Pérez, 1895
- Panurgus meridionalis Patiny, Ortiz-Sánchez & Michez, 2005
- Panurgus minor Warncke, 1972
- Panurgus nasutus Spinola, 1838
- Panurgus nigriscopus Pérez, 1895
- Panurgus niloticus Warncke, 1972
- Panurgus oblitus Warncke, 1972
- Panurgus ovatulus Warncke, 1972
- Panurgus perezi Saunders, 1882
- Panurgus phyllopodus Warncke, 1972
- Panurgus pici Pérez, 1895
- Panurgus platymerus Pérez, 1895
- Panurgus posticus Warncke, 1972
- Panurgus pyropygus Friese, 1901
- Panurgus rungsii Benoist, 1937
- Panurgus siculus Morawitz, 1872
- Panurgus sidensis Warncke, 1987
- Panurgus soikai Pittioni, 1950
- Panurgus vachali Pérez, 1895
- Panurgus variegatus Morawitz, 1876
