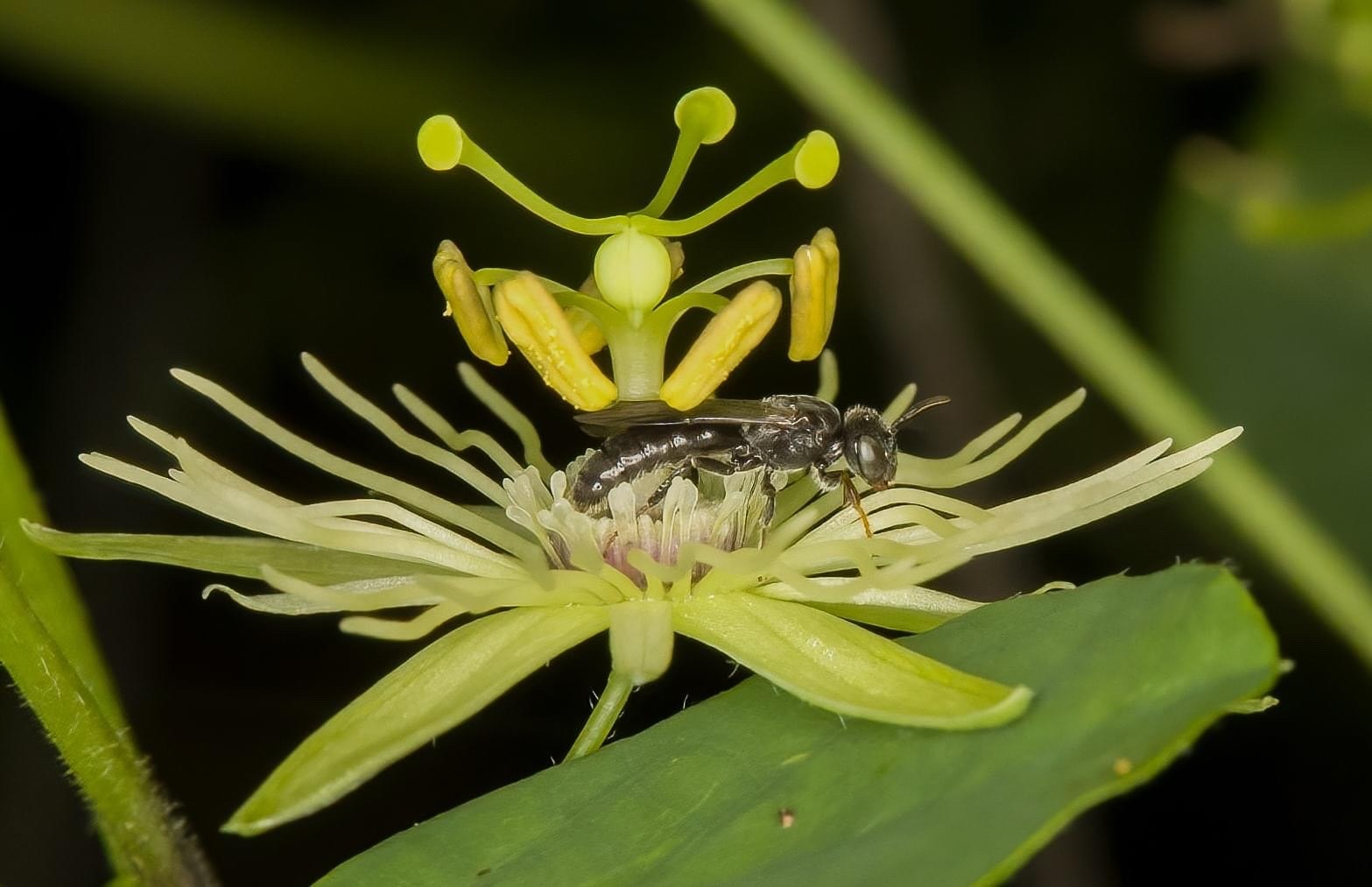

Scientific classification
- Kingdom: Animalia
- Phylum: Arthropoda
- Class: Insecta
- Order: Hymenoptera
- Family: Andrenidae
- Genus: Protandrena
- Subgenus: Anthemurgus
- Species: P. (A.) passiflorae

Binomial name
- Protandrena (Anthemurgus) passiflorae (Robertson, 1902)

= Anthemurgus =

Passionflower Bee

Subgenus of bees

Protandrena (Anthemurgus) passiflorae, the passionflower bee, is a small (7.5-8.5 mm long) black bee that occurs from central Texas to North Carolina and north to Illinois.

== Behavior ==
Females of this solitary bee use collected nectar and pollen to feed larvae located in nests constructed in the ground (through mass provisioning). This uncommon bee is unusual for two reasons: first, the only known pollen host is a single species—the yellow passionflower (Passiflora lutea) (such specialization is called oligolecty); second, because of its size and foraging habits, the passionflower bee is thought to contribute little or nothing toward the pollination of its host plant. Female bees remove pollen from P. lutea by suspending themselves under an anther and scraping the pollen out with open mandibles. This unique position of pollen collection almost never results in pollination as the female bee rarely touches the stigma.

== Taxonomy and phylogeny ==
Historically the genus Anthemurgus contained only the passionflower bee and thus was considered a monotypic taxon, and some more recent authorities treated it as a monotypic subgenus within the genus Pseudopanurgus, it has recently been included in the genus Protandrena. The genome as recently been sequenced as part of the Beenome100 project, part of a collaboration between the USDA ARS, the University of Illinois, and other university researchers.
