= Anthrenoides =

Scientific classification
- Kingdom: Animalia
- Phylum: Arthropoda
- Class: Insecta
- Order: Hymenoptera
- Family: Andrenidae
- Genus: Anthrenoides; Ducke, 1907

Genus of bees

Anthrenoides is a genus of bees belonging to the family Andrenidae.

The species of this genus are found in South America.

All but three species were discovered between 2005 and 2009 by Brazilian entomologist Danúncia Urban (b. 1933).

Species:

- Anthrenoides admirabilis Urban, 2005
- Anthrenoides affinis Urban, 2007
- Anthrenoides albinoi Urban, 2005
- Anthrenoides alineae Urban, 2008
- Anthrenoides alvarengai Urban, 2007
- Anthrenoides antonii Urban, 2005
- Anthrenoides araucariae Urban, 2005
- Anthrenoides atriventris (Schrottky, 1906)
- Anthrenoides birgitae Urban, 2008
- Anthrenoides bocainensis Urban, 2007
- Anthrenoides caatingae Urban, 2006
- Anthrenoides calderensis Urban, 2009
- Anthrenoides cearensis Urban, 2006
- Anthrenoides cordobensis Urban, 2009
- Anthrenoides corrugatus Urban, 2005
- Anthrenoides cyphomandrae Urban, 2005
- Anthrenoides deborae Urban, 2006
- Anthrenoides densopunctatus Urban, 2005
- Anthrenoides digitatus Urban, 2007
- Anthrenoides elegantulus Urban, 2005
- Anthrenoides elioi Urban, 2008
- Anthrenoides falsificus Urban, 2007
- Anthrenoides faviziae Urban, 2005
- Anthrenoides flavomaculatus Urban, 2007
- Anthrenoides francisci Urban, 2008
- Anthrenoides gibberosus Urban, 2009
- Anthrenoides gibbosus Urban, 2008
- Anthrenoides glossatus Urban, 2007
- Anthrenoides guarapuavae Urban, 2005
- Anthrenoides guttulatus Urban, 2005
- Anthrenoides jordanensis Urban, 2007
- Anthrenoides kelliae Urban, 2008
- Anthrenoides labratus Urban, 2007
- Anthrenoides langei Urban, 2005
- Anthrenoides larocai Urban, 2005
- Anthrenoides lavrensis Urban, 2007
- Anthrenoides magaliae Urban, 2005
- Anthrenoides meloi Urban, 2005
- Anthrenoides meridionalis (Schrottky, 1906)
- Anthrenoides micans Urban, 1995
- Anthrenoides neffi Urban, 2009
- Anthrenoides nigrinasis (Vachal, 1909)
- Anthrenoides nordestinus Urban, 2006
- Anthrenoides ornatus Urban, 2005
- Anthrenoides palmeirae Urban, 2005
- Anthrenoides paolae Urban, 2005
- Anthrenoides paranaensis Urban, 2005
- Anthrenoides paulensis Urban, 2008
- Anthrenoides petrolinensis Urban, 2006
- Anthrenoides petuniae Urban, 2005
- Anthrenoides pinhalensis Urban, 2005
- Anthrenoides politus Urban, 2005
- Anthrenoides reticulatus Urban, 2005
- Anthrenoides rodrigoi Urban, 2005
- Anthrenoides saltensis Urban, 2009
- Anthrenoides sanpedroi Urban, 2009
- Anthrenoides santiagoi Urban, 2005
- Anthrenoides serranicola Urban, 2005
- Anthrenoides sidiae Urban, 2008
- Anthrenoides sulinus Urban, 2008
- Anthrenoides tucumanus Urban, 2009
- Anthrenoides villaguayensis Urban, 2009
- Anthrenoides zanellai Urban, 2005
