= Philip Hunter Timberlake =

American entomologist

Philip Hunter Timberlake (5 June 1883 – 17 April 1981) was one of the most prolific American entomologists of the 20th century. He worked as an Associate Entomologist in the Department of Entomology of the University of California, Riverside. He described and named many insects including bees.

== Early life and education ==
Timberlake was born in Bethel, Maine, the fifth of seven children of Isadore Margaret née Billings and school teacher Davis True Timberlake. He obtained an A.B. degree in 1908 in Liberal Arts from Bowdoin College with a major in Greek and Latin. In 1910 he received an A.M. degree in biology from Harvard University.

== Career ==
From 1909 to 1914, Timberlake was employed by the U.S. Department of Agriculture Bureau of Entomology, as "Agent and Expert" conducting research in biological control of pest insects. From 1914 to 1924 he was Associate Entomologist at the Hawaiian Sugar Planters Experiment Station in Honolulu, where his research dealt primarily with biological control using parasites and predators. In 1924 he was appointed Associate Entomologist in the Department of Biological Control at the Citrus Experiment Station of the University of California, Riverside, where he served until retirement in 1950. He continued his regular work schedule afterward, but his eyesight slowly failed in later years, and in 1980, at age 97 years, it reached the point where he could no longer continue his work.

Illustration from one of his publications

The appointment of Timberlake in the Department of Biological Control in 1924 was motivated by his extensive knowledge of the taxonomy of parasitic Hymenoptera and of predaceous ladybird beetles, groups of importance in biological control of pest insects. However, by the late 1920s and thereafter, he focused almost entirely upon the taxonomy of native bees, especially the genus Perdita. There are over 800 species of Perdita, most described by Timberlake, but also by T.D.A. Cockerell. They are almost all specialist pollinators (oligoleges) of many species of plants, especially in the Sonoran Desert, where Timberlake carried out extensive collecting for decades.

He described and named about 800 species of bees in total over his career, and several other species in other insect groups. He published over 100 scientific papers, mostly on bees, in addition to 8 volumes on the genus Perdita alone. His colleagues and former students throughout the world have described over 50 new species of insects, named timberlakei as patronyms in his honor. His insect collection contained about 500,000 specimens of which about 150,000 were Hymenoptera, including what was once the largest bee collection in North America, and this served as the foundation for the collection now housed in the University of California's Entomology Research Museum, containing some 4 million total specimens.

== Family ==
He married Edith Milhous in 1917 in Honolulu and they had three children. Edith was the sister of Hannah Milhous Nixon and an aunt of former President Richard M. Nixon, whose law school career she helped finance. She and the elderly scientist attended Nixon's presidential inauguration at his invitation, and she died a few years later, in 1972.
