= Oligolecty =

Pollinators with a narrow preference for pollen sources

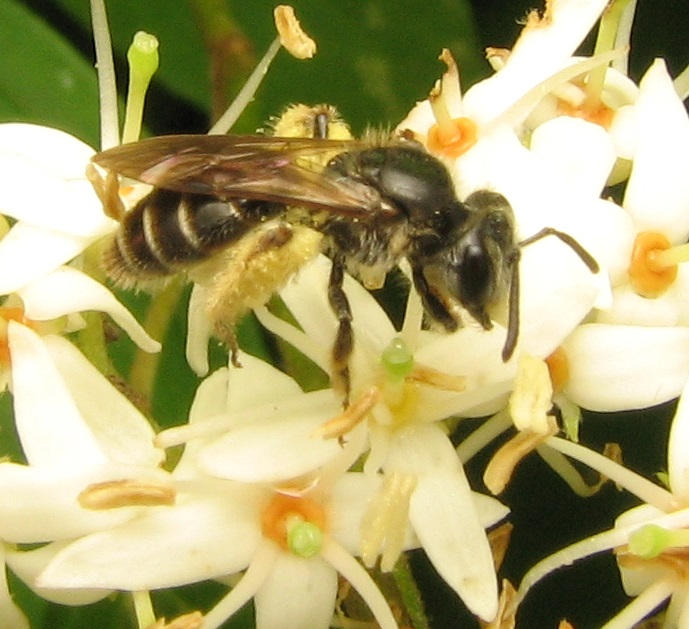
The dogwood andrena, Andrena Subgenus Gonandrena, oligolectic on dogwoods

The term oligolecty is used in pollination ecology to refer to bees that exhibit a narrow, specialized preference for pollen sources, typically to a single family or genus of flowering plants. The preference may occasionally extend broadly to multiple genera within a single plant family, or be as narrow as a single plant species. When the choice is very narrow, the term monolecty is sometimes used, originally meaning a single plant species but recently broadened to include examples where the host plants are related members of a single genus. The opposite term is polylectic and refers to species that collect pollen from a wide range of species. The most familiar example of a polylectic species is the domestic honey bee.

Oligolectic pollinators are often called oligoleges or simply specialist pollinators, and this behavior is especially common in the bee families Andrenidae and Halictidae, though there are thousands of species in hundreds of genera, in essentially all known bee families; in certain areas of the world, such as deserts, oligoleges may represent half or more of all the resident bee species. Attempts have been made to determine whether a narrow host preference is due to an inability of the bee larvae to digest and develop on a variety of pollen types, or a limitation of the adult bee's learning and perception (i.e., they simply do not recognize other flowers as potential food sources), and most of the available evidence suggests the latter. However, a few plants whose pollen contains toxic substances (e.g., Toxicoscordion and related genera in the Melanthieae) are visited by oligolectic bees, and these may fall into the former category. The evidence from large-scale phylogenetic analyses of bee evolution suggests that, for most groups of bees, oligolecty is the ancestral condition and polylectic lineages arose from among those ancestral specialists.

There are some cases where oligoleges collect their host plant's pollen as larval food but, for various reasons, rarely or never actually pollinate the flowers. A well-studied example is the relationship between the yellow passionflower (Passiflora lutea) and the passionflower bee (Anthemurgus passiflorae) in Texas.
