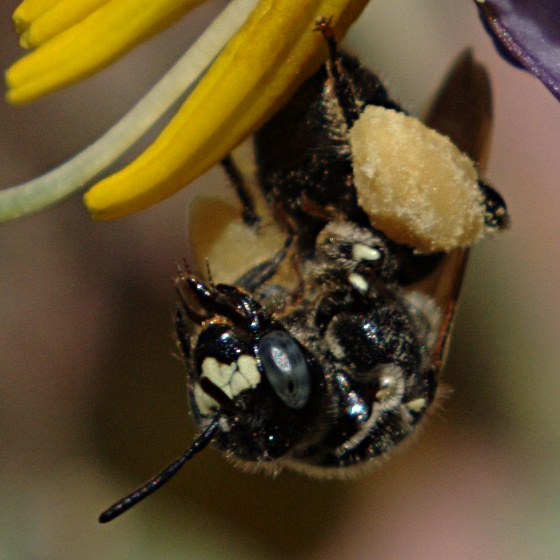
- Female Protandrena mexicanorum carrying pollen

Scientific classification
- Domain: Eukaryota
- Kingdom: Animalia
- Phylum: Arthropoda
- Class: Insecta
- Order: Hymenoptera
- Family: Andrenidae
- Subfamily: Panurginae

Tribes
- Calliopsini; Melitturgini; Nolanomelissini; Panurgini; Perditini; Protandrenini; Protomeliturgini

= Panurginae =

Bee subfamily

Calliopsis sp., female

The bee subfamily Panurginae is a diverse lineage of 33 genera in 7 tribes. They are particularly diverse in the New World, though scarce in the tropics, and in the Old World they can be found primarily in the Palaearctic and Africa, but absent from Australia and tropical Asia. They tend to be associated with xeric or sandy habitats.

The "facial foveae" of Panurgines are not broad, velvety depressions as in Andreninae, but reduced to grooves or pits at the upper margin of the eyes. The apex of the marginal cell of the wing is truncate, and the trochanteral scopa is reduced. Panurgines also frequently have yellow markings in locations other than on the face, a feature not seen in any other subfamilies of Andrenidae.

Most members of this subfamily are oligolectic, with highly specialized floral associations, especially in desert species.

== Systematics ==
- Tribe Protandrenini
  - Anthemurgus
  - Anthrenoides
  - Chaeturginus
  - Liphanthus
  - Neffapis
  - Parapsaenythia
  - Protandrena
  - Psaenythia
  - Pseudopanurgus
  - Rhophitulus
- Tribe Panurgini
  - Avpanurgus
  - Camptopoeum
  - Panurginus
  - Panurgus
- Tribe Nolanomelissini
  - Nolanomelissa
- Tribe Melitturgini
  - Belliturgula
  - Borgatomelissa
  - Flavomeliturgula
  - Gasparinahla
  - Khuzimelissa
  - Melitturga
  - Meliturgula
  - Mermiglossa
  - Plesiopanurgus
- Tribe Protomeliturgini
  - Protomeliturga
- Tribe Perditini
  - Macrotera
  - Perdita

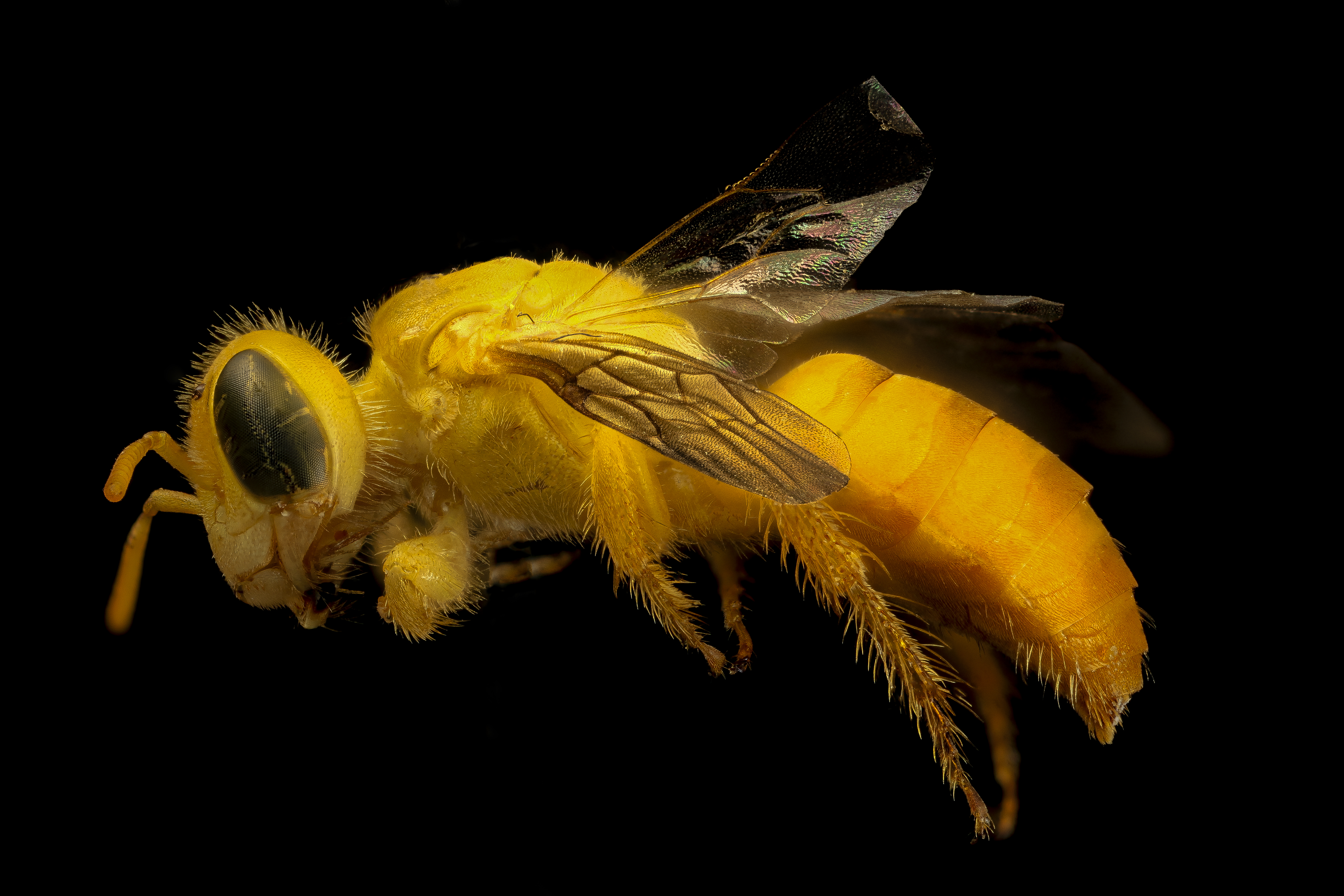
Arhysosage sp., a panurgine bee in the tribe Calliopsini

- Tribe Calliopsini
  - Acamptopoeum
  - Arhysosage
  - Calliopsis
  - Callonychium
  - Litocalliopsis
  - Spinoliella
  - Xeranthrena
