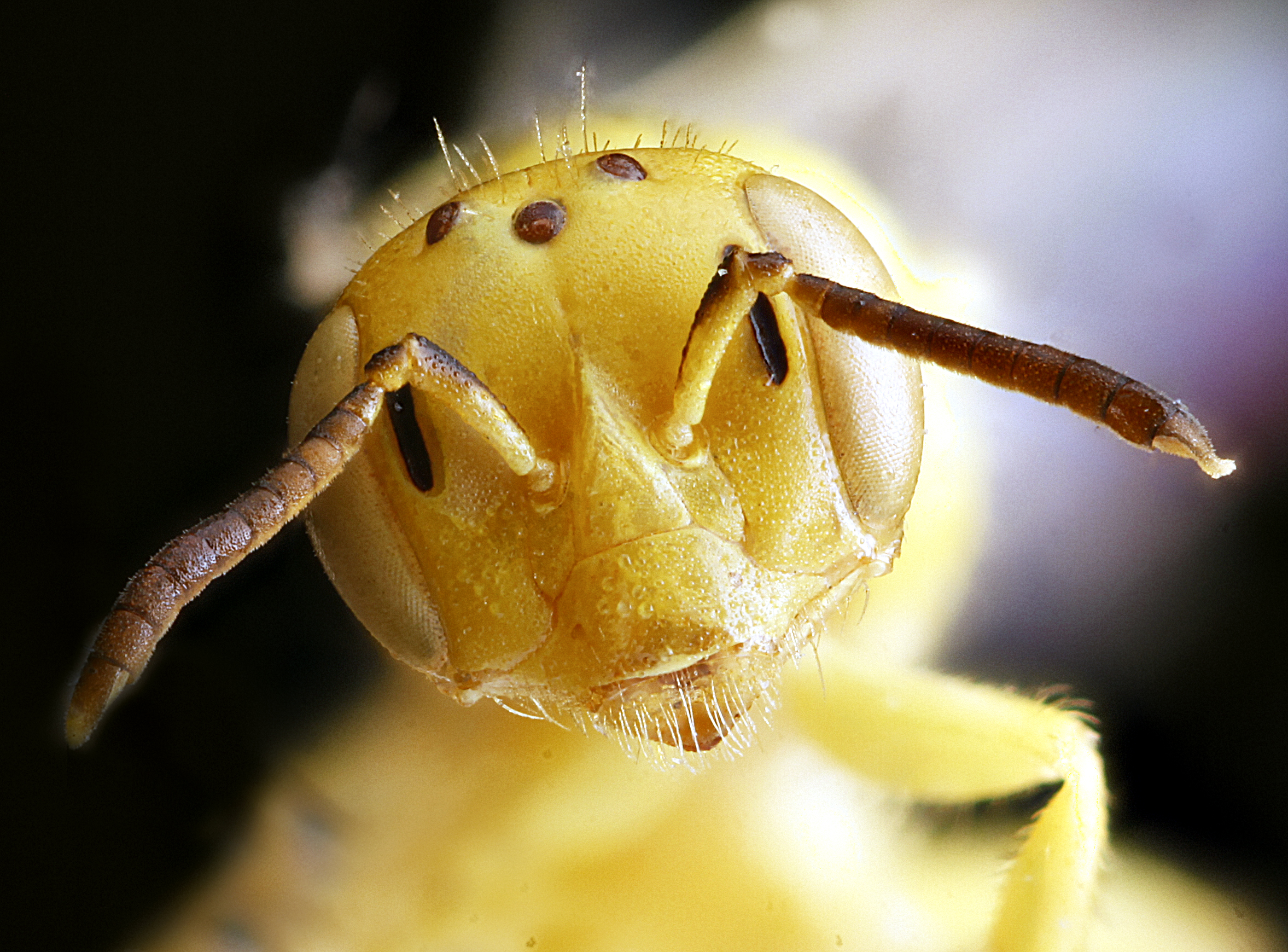
- Perdita luteola, female

Scientific classification
- Kingdom: Animalia
- Phylum: Arthropoda
- Clade: Pancrustacea
- Class: Insecta
- Order: Hymenoptera
- Family: Andrenidae
- Subfamily: Panurginae
- Genus: Perdita

Species
- 634, see text

= Perdita (bee) =

Genus of bees

Perdita is a large genus of small bees native to North America, which are particularly diverse in the desert regions of the United States and Mexico. There are over 600 currently recognized species in the genus Perdita, with many more species that remain undescribed. Species of the genus Perdita are usually quite small (2.0 mm to 10.0 mm) and often brightly colored with metallic reflections and/or yellow or white markings, and among the few lineages of bees incapable of stinging. The genus was extensively treated by P.H. Timberlake who, in addition to T.D.A. Cockerell, described most of the known species. Most species are extreme specialists (oligoleges) with respect to pollen and will only collect pollen from a few closely related species or genera of plants. Many species in this genus are called fairy bees.

They may be parasitized by Neolarra cuckoo bees, which lay eggs in their nests given the opportunity.

== See also ==
- List of Perdita species
