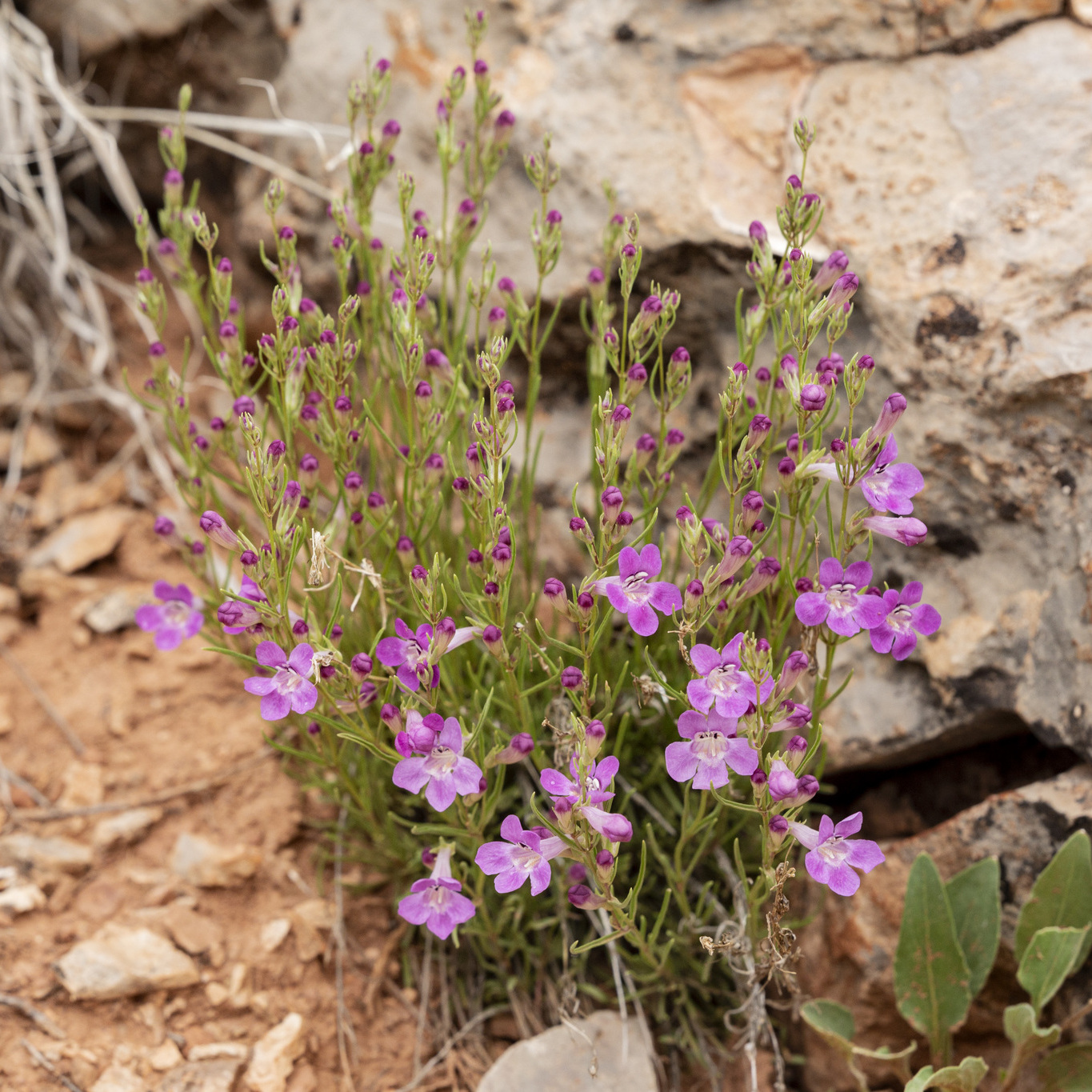
- Bighorn Basin, Hot Springs County, Wyoming

Conservation status
- Apparently Secure (NatureServe)

Scientific classification
- Kingdom: Plantae
- Clade: Tracheophytes
- Clade: Angiosperms
- Clade: Eudicots
- Clade: Asterids
- Order: Lamiales
- Family: Plantaginaceae
- Genus: Penstemon
- Species: P. laricifolius

Binomial name
- Penstemon laricifolius Hook. & Arn.

Varieties
- P. laricifolius var. exilifolius; P. laricifolius var. laricifolius

Synonyms
- List: Penstemon exilifolius; Penstemon filifolius

= Penstemon laricifolius =

Plant species in the veronica family

Penstemon laricifolius, the larchleaf penstemon, is a small herbaceous plant from the northern Rocky Mountain states of Montana, Wyoming, and Colorado. It grows in a form like a small tuft of grass and has very narrow leaves. In southern parts of its range its funnel shaped flowers are more white or pale and in the north they are deeper pink or purple. It is infrequently grown as a cultivated plant dry rock gardens.

== Description ==
Larchleaf penstemon is small herbaceous plant with stems that reach 10 to 30 centimeters (4 to 12 in) in height at full size. They are caespitose in form, resembling a tuft of grass.

Its leaves are may be basal or cauline, attached directly to the base of the plant or to its stems, and are hairless except for rarely at base usually on the edges of the leaves. The basal leaves are narrow and short, measuring just 15 to 40 millimeters long and usually less than 20 mm with a width of 0.5 to 1.5 mm. The leaves attach directly to the plant without a leaf stem with the base more or less clasping. Each stem will have three to seven pairs of leaves attached on opposite sides of the stem. These are even smaller, just 11 to 35 mm long and 0.3 to 1 mm wide. They have bases that taper or clasp the stems and a narrow point.

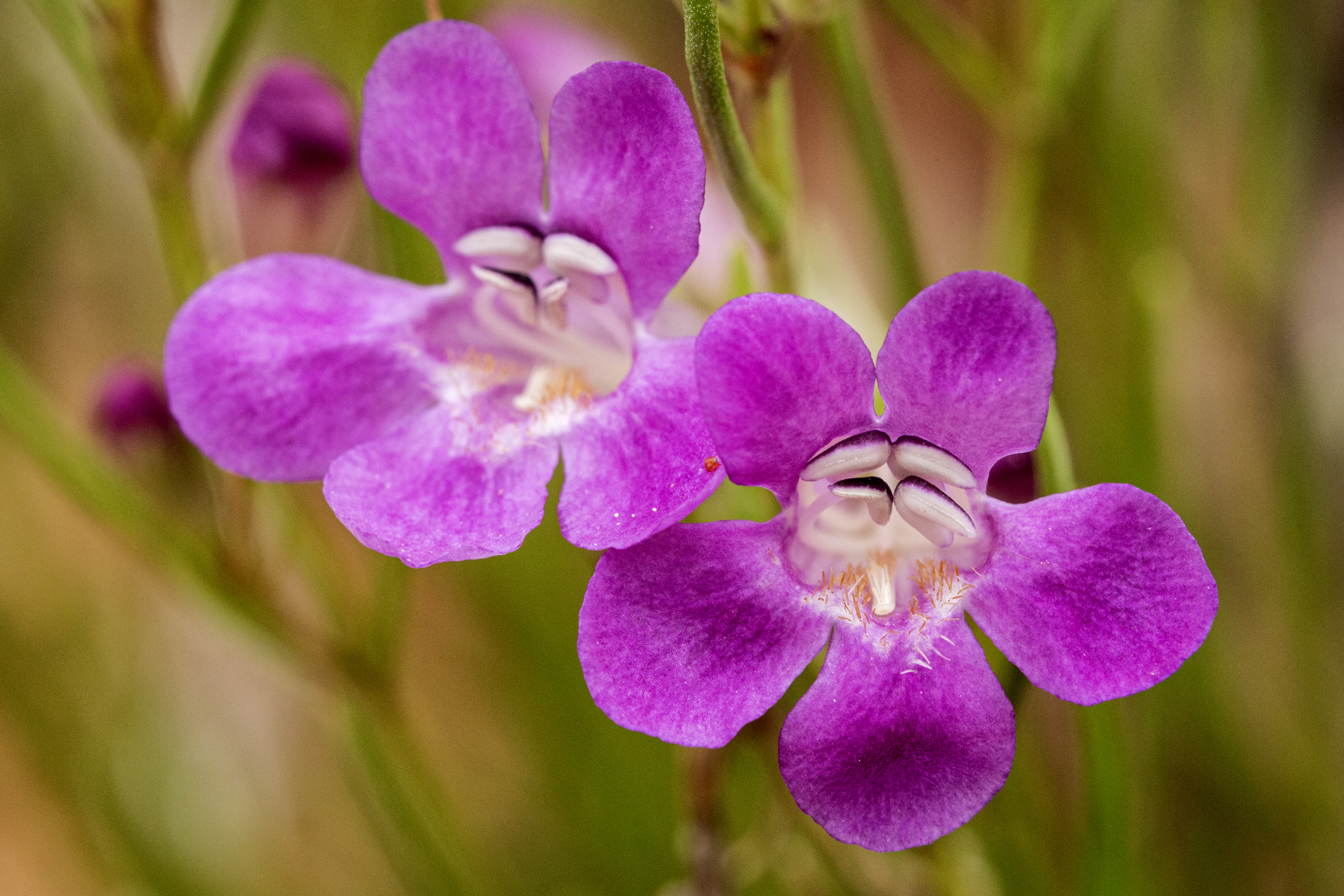
Showing the moderately hairy throat of the flower

The species as a whole has a wide range of flower colors from white to purple, including pink, violet, and greenish, but always lacking nectar guidelines. The flowers are held on the upper parts of flowering stems, but the outermost stems may bend to the ground giving the appearance of having flowers all the way down the plant. The inflorescence is the upper 3 to 15 cm (1.2 to 5.9 in) of the stem with three to seven groups of flower each with one or two attachment points and each of these cymes with one to three flowers. The flowers are funnel shaped and range in length from 9 to 18 mm. The flower's tube is 4–5 mm and gets gradually wider towards the opening without a constriction at the mouth. Inside the flower it is covered with a moderate amount of yellow hairs. The stamens do not reach outside the flower and the staminode also is inside the flower or just reaches the opening. It is covered in yellow or yellow-orange hairs. Variety exilifolius blooms as early as June and as late as August while variety laricifolius will also bloom in May. The bloom period can vary significantly from year to year, the season continuing in wet year and being shortened in years of drought.

The fruit is a capsule that measures 4–5 mm tall and 2.5–4 mm wide.

It is somewhat similar in appearance to rock penstemon (Penstemon gairdneri) and lives in similar habitats, but rock penstemon is found in the sagebrush steppes of Washington, Oregon, and Idaho.

== Taxonomy ==
Penstemon laricifolius was scientifically described and named in 1839 by the botanists William Jackson Hooker and George Arnott Walker Arnott. Though the type specimen was described by Hooker and Arnott as being found near "Snake Fort, Snake County" in Idaho, later botanists like David D. Keck doubt that it was collected in Idaho. The collection was probably by the trapper John McLeod a friend of William Fraser Tolmie.

It is classified in the Penstemon genus in the veronica family. Analysis of the DNA indicates that it is related to the species in section Cristati such as Penstemon breviculus, Penstemon triflorus, and Penstemon cobaea. It genome contains 558 mega base pairs, towards the smaller end of species surveyed in the Penstemon genus.

=== Varieties ===
Penstemon laricifolius has two varieties according to Plants of the World Online. There are populations in Wyoming which have a mix of characteristics. Known locations include two in the Bighorn National Forest and one in Medicine Bow-Routt National Forest.

==== Penstemon laricifolius var. exilifolius ====
This variety was described in 1901 by Aven Nelson as a species named Penstemon exilifolius. In 1924 Edwin Blake Payson described it as a variety of Penstemon laricifolius. It was also described as a subspecies by David D. Keck in 1937. Most of this variety grows in the watershed of the Laramie River, largely in southern Wyoming and a small portion of northern Colorado. The flower may be white, pale pink, or slightly green. In the Flora of North America it is defined as having white flowers measuring shorter on average, 9–15 mm, but overlapping with that of variety laricifolius. It grows at elevations from 1,500 to 2,900 meters (4,900 to 9,500 ft) in sandy or gravelly grasslands and the sagebrush steppe. It is occasionally called Nelson larchleaf penstemon for Aven Nelson.

==== Penstemon laricifolius var. laricifolius ====
The autonymic variety is the more northerly of the two varieties, growing in central and western Wyoming and in southern Wyoming. It has longer and darker flowers, pink, violet, or purple in color and measuring 10–18 mm. It grows at elevations from 1,500 to 2,400 meters (4,900 to 7,900 ft) and like variety exilifolius is associated with grasslands and the sagebrush steppe, but also may be found in pine forest openings.

=== Synonyms ===
Penstemon laricifolius has 5 synonyms of the species or one of its varieties.

Table of Synonyms
Name	Year	Rank	Synonym of:	Notes
Penstemon exilifolius A.Nelson	1901	species	var. exilifolius	≡ hom.
Penstemon exilifolius var. desertus A.Nelson	1901	variety	var. exilifolius	= het.
Penstemon filifolius Nutt. ex Benth.	1846	species	var. laricifolius	= het.
Penstemon laricifolius subsp. exilifolius (A.Nelson) D.D.Keck	1937	subspecies	var. exilifolius	≡ hom.
Penstemon laricifolius subsp. typicus D.D.Keck	1937	subspecies	P. laricifolius	≡ hom., not validly publ.
Notes: ≡ homotypic synonym; = heterotypic synonym

=== Names ===
The species name, laricifolius, means "with larch like leaves" in botanical Latin. Similarly, in English it is known by the common name larchleaf pestemon.

== Range and habitat ==
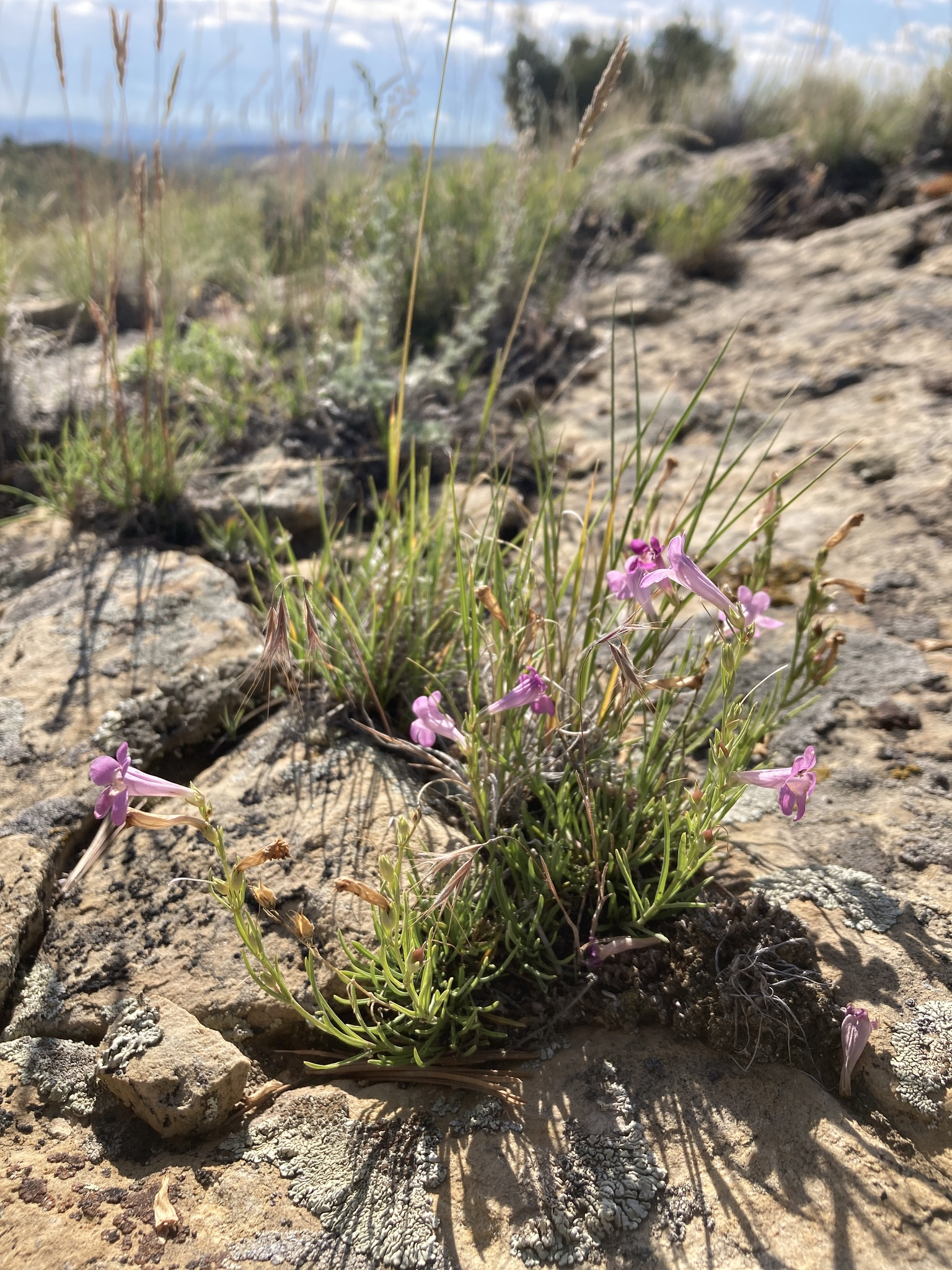
Plant growing from a rock in Hot Springs County, Wyoming

The native range of larchleaf penstemon is from southern Montana through Wyoming to northern Colorado. In Montana it is confined to just Carbon and Big Horn counties, but it grows through much of western Wyoming. In Colorado it grows in just the Laramie River valley in northwestern Larimer County.

== Ecology ==
Twenty-eight species of bees in four different families have were collected by Vince Tepedino over the course of three years from flowers of Penstemon laricifolius var. exilifolius at two study locations in the Laramie Basin. Though some of the species were not positively identified. The bumblebee species in family Apidae include the white-shouldered bumblebee (Bombus appositus), the two-form bumblebee (Bombus bifarius), the central bumblebee (Bombus centralis), the golden northern bumble bee (Bombus fervidus), the yellow-fronted bumble bee (Bombus flavifrons), the Hunt bumblebee (Bombus huntii), the Nevada bumblebee (Bombus nevadensis), the western bumble bee (Bombus occidentalis), and the red-belted bumblebee (Bombus rufocinctus). Others in the same family include Anthophora albata, Ceratina nanula, and Ceratina neomexicana. In family Andrenidae, the mining bees, visitors include the Costilla miner bee (Andrena costillensis), the streaked miner bee (Calliopsis zebrata), and the grassland miner bee (Pseudopanurgus didirupa). The family of solitary bees Megachilidae species include Anthidium tenuiflorae, Ashmeadiella gillettei, Osmia brevis, Osmia bruneri, Osmia giliarum, Osmia integra, and Osmia sculleni. In family Halictidae, the sweat bees, the three species Lasioglossum pruinosum, Lasioglossum semicaeruleum, and Halictus confusus.

=== Conservation ===
The conservation organization NatureServe evaluated Penstemon laricifolius in 1984 and rated it as apparently secure (G4) at the global level. They similarly rated it at the state level as apparently secure (S4) in Wyoming. In Montana they rated it as vulnerable (S3) and imperiled (S2) in Colorado.

Separately, NatureServe evaluated Penstemon laricifolius var. exilifolius in 2017, though with the rank of subspecies. They found it to be vulnerable (T3) at the global level. The species has about 20 existing populations containing 13,000 plants. Since the 1950s at least 11 populations have been destroyed. Ongoing threats to the variety include residential development, invasion of non-native species, and recreation.

== Cultivation ==
Larchleaf pestemon is grown in rock gardens, but often has to be grown in garden troughs to be kept more evenly dry than in ground beds are able to provide. Though it is adapted to very dry conditions it requires moisture in the spring to flower. The seeds of the species show some need for cold moist stratification to break dormancy. Only 10% of seeds sprouted when planted at 21 °C (70 °F) while 56% sprouted after being held at 4 °C (40 °F) for ten to twelve weeks first.

== See also ==
List of Penstemon species
