= Calliopsis fracta =

Scientific classification
- Domain: Eukaryota
- Kingdom: Animalia
- Phylum: Arthropoda
- Class: Insecta
- Order: Hymenoptera
- Family: Andrenidae
- Tribe: Calliopsini
- Genus: Calliopsis
- Species: C. fracta

Binomial name
- Calliopsis fracta (Rozen, 1952)

Species of bee

Calliopsis fracta is a species of bee in the family Andrenidae. It is found in North America.
