= Calliopsis obscurella =

Scientific classification
- Domain: Eukaryota
- Kingdom: Animalia
- Phylum: Arthropoda
- Class: Insecta
- Order: Hymenoptera
- Family: Andrenidae
- Tribe: Calliopsini
- Genus: Calliopsis
- Species: C. obscurella

Binomial name
- Calliopsis obscurella Cresson, 1879

Species of bee

Calliopsis obscurella is a species of bee in the family Andrenidae. It is found in Central America and North America.
