= Calliopsis scutellaris =

Scientific classification
- Domain: Eukaryota
- Kingdom: Animalia
- Phylum: Arthropoda
- Class: Insecta
- Order: Hymenoptera
- Family: Andrenidae
- Tribe: Calliopsini
- Genus: Calliopsis
- Species: C. scutellaris

Binomial name
- Calliopsis scutellaris Fowler, 1899

Species of bee

Calliopsis scutellaris is a species of bee in the family Andrenidae. It is found in Central America and North America.

== Subspecies ==
These two subspecies belong to the species Calliopsis scutellaris:

- Calliopsis scutellaris peninsularis (Cockerell, 1923)
- Calliopsis scutellaris scutellaris
