= Calliopsis puellae =

Scientific classification
- Kingdom: Animalia
- Phylum: Arthropoda
- Class: Insecta
- Order: Hymenoptera
- Family: Andrenidae
- Tribe: Calliopsini
- Genus: Calliopsis
- Species: C. puellae

Binomial name
- Calliopsis puellae (Cockerell, 1933)

Synonyms
- Spinoliella puellae Cockerell, 1933

Species of bee

Calliopsis puellae is a species of bee in the family Andrenidae. It is found in Central America and North America.

The species' type specimen was collected by Wilmatte Porter Cockerell and her great-niece, Lelah Milene Porter (1927–2001). It is now at Harvard University's Museum of Comparative Zoology. The species was named (as Spinoliella puellae) by Wilmatte's husband, Theodore Dru Alison Cockerell, who wrote:

The name S. puellae commemorates the very little girl who helped my wife to collect the specimens.
