= Calliopsis subalpina =

Scientific classification
- Kingdom: Animalia
- Phylum: Arthropoda
- Class: Insecta
- Order: Hymenoptera
- Family: Andrenidae
- Tribe: Calliopsini
- Genus: Calliopsis
- Species: C. subalpina

Binomial name
- Calliopsis subalpina Cockerell, 1894

Species of bee

Calliopsis subalpina is a species of bee in the family Andrenidae. It is found in Central America and North America.
