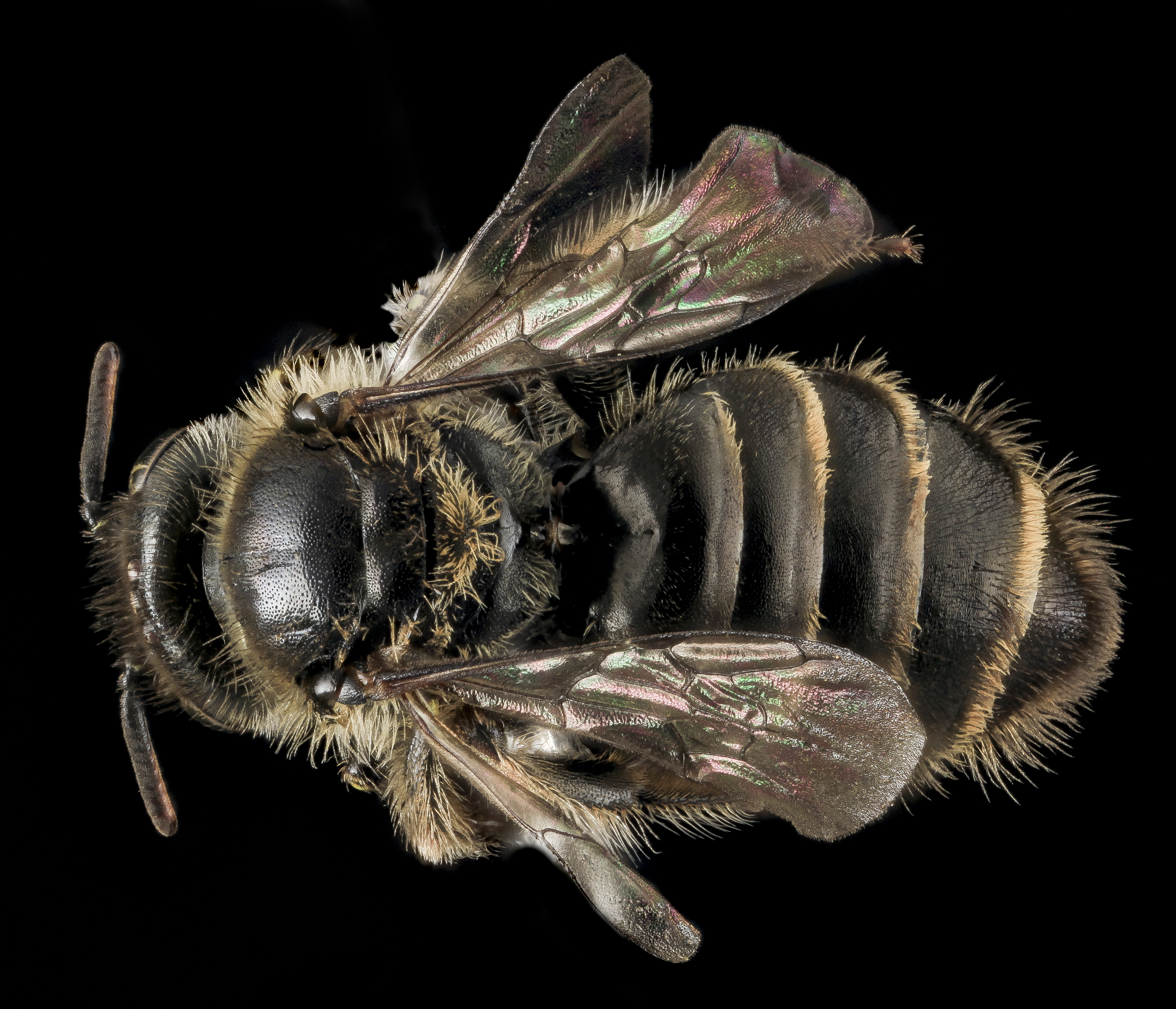

Scientific classification
- Kingdom: Animalia
- Phylum: Arthropoda
- Class: Insecta
- Order: Hymenoptera
- Family: Andrenidae
- Tribe: Calliopsini
- Genus: Calliopsis
- Species: C. andreniformis

Binomial name
- Calliopsis andreniformis Smith, 1853

= Calliopsis andreniformis =

Species of bee

The eastern miner bee (Calliopsis andreniformis) is a species of miner bee in the family Andrenidae. It is found in North America. It is a specialist in pollinating Fabaceae plants.
