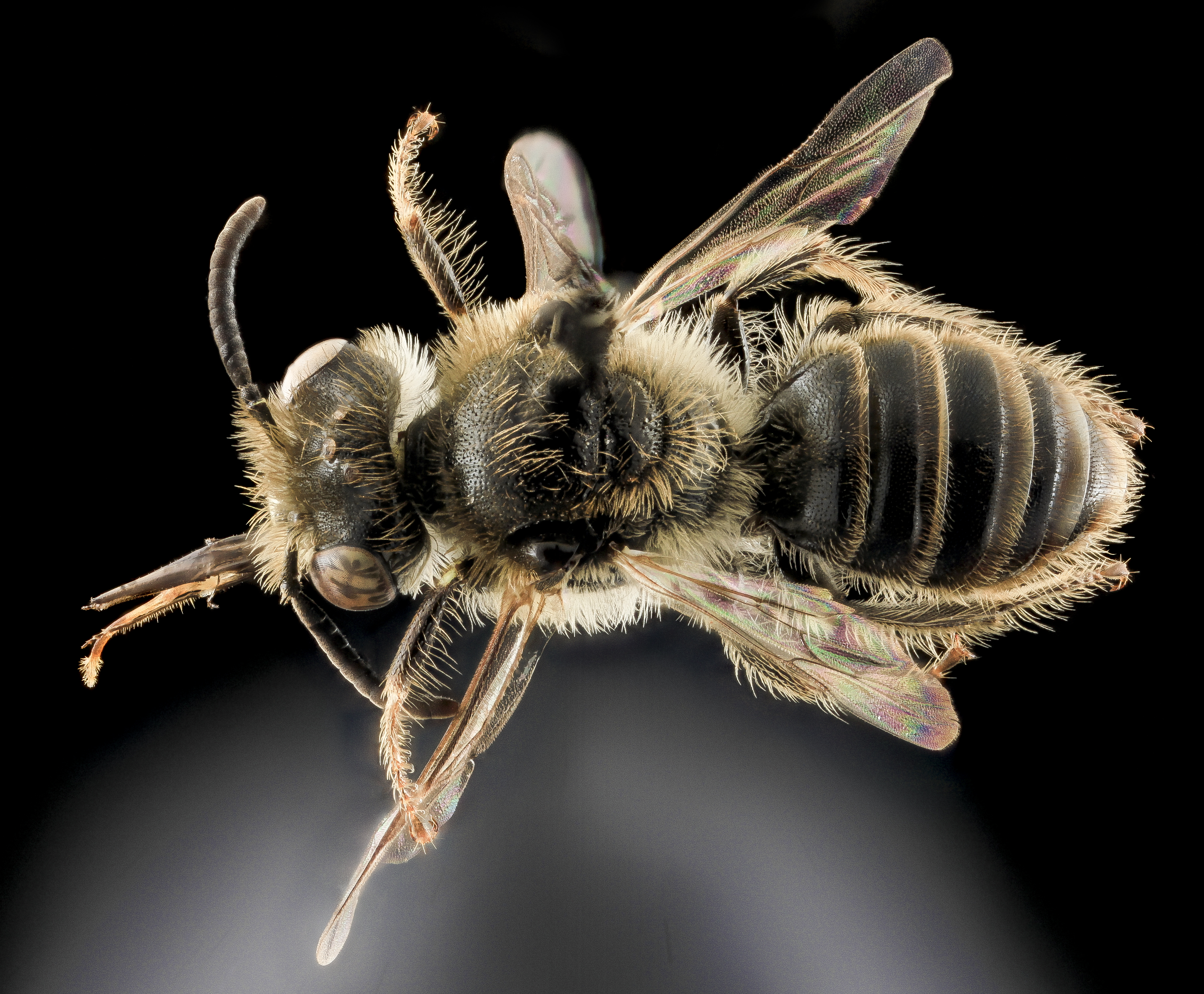

Scientific classification
- Domain: Eukaryota
- Kingdom: Animalia
- Phylum: Arthropoda
- Class: Insecta
- Order: Hymenoptera
- Family: Andrenidae
- Tribe: Calliopsini
- Genus: Calliopsis
- Species: C. nebraskensis

Binomial name
- Calliopsis nebraskensis Crawford, 1902

= Calliopsis nebraskensis =

Species of bee

Calliopsis nebraskensis is a species of bee in the family Andrenidae. It is found in North America.
