= Calliopsis anomoptera =

Scientific classification
- Domain: Eukaryota
- Kingdom: Animalia
- Phylum: Arthropoda
- Class: Insecta
- Order: Hymenoptera
- Family: Andrenidae
- Tribe: Calliopsini
- Genus: Calliopsis
- Species: C. anomoptera

Binomial name
- Calliopsis anomoptera Michener, 1942

Species of bee

Calliopsis anomoptera is a species of bee in the family Andrenidae. It is found in Central America and North America.

== Description ==
Adult bees are about 5mm long and have a red abdomen.
