= Calliopsis filiorum =

Scientific classification
- Kingdom: Animalia
- Phylum: Arthropoda
- Class: Insecta
- Order: Hymenoptera
- Family: Andrenidae
- Tribe: Calliopsini
- Genus: Calliopsis
- Species: C. filiorum

Binomial name
- Calliopsis filiorum (Rozen, 1963)

Synonyms
- Nomadopsis filiorum Rozen, 1963

Species of bee

Calliopsis filiorum is a species of bee in the family Andrenidae. It is found in North America.
