= Calliopsis linsleyi =

Scientific classification
- Domain: Eukaryota
- Kingdom: Animalia
- Phylum: Arthropoda
- Class: Insecta
- Order: Hymenoptera
- Family: Andrenidae
- Tribe: Calliopsini
- Genus: Calliopsis
- Species: C. linsleyi

Binomial name
- Calliopsis linsleyi (Rozen, 1958)

Synonyms
- Nomadopsis linsleyi Rozen, 1958

Species of bee

Calliopsis linsleyi is a species of mining bee in the family Andrenidae. It is found in Central America and North America.
