= Calliopsis =

Calliopsis is the generic name of two groups of organisms. It can refer to:

- Coreopsis section Calliopsis, a group of plants in a genus of the family Asteraceae
- Calliopsis (bee), a genus of mining bees
