= Calliopsis barbata =

Scientific classification
- Domain: Eukaryota
- Kingdom: Animalia
- Phylum: Arthropoda
- Class: Insecta
- Order: Hymenoptera
- Family: Andrenidae
- Tribe: Calliopsini
- Genus: Calliopsis
- Species: C. barbata

Binomial name
- Calliopsis barbata (Timberlake, 1952)

Synonyms
- Nomadopsis barbata Timberlake, 1952

Species of bee

Calliopsis barbata is a species of bee in the family Andrenidae. It is found in Central America and North America.
