= Yellow bumblebee =

Yellow bumblebee is a common name for several insects and may refer to:

- Bombus auricomus
- Bombus fervidus
- Bombus flavifrons
