= Calliopsis hesperia =

Scientific classification
- Kingdom: Animalia
- Phylum: Arthropoda
- Class: Insecta
- Order: Hymenoptera
- Family: Andrenidae
- Tribe: Calliopsini
- Genus: Calliopsis
- Species: C. hesperia

Binomial name
- Calliopsis hesperia (Swenk & Cockerell, 1907)

Species of bee

Calliopsis hesperia is a species of bee in the family Andrenidae. It is found in North America.

== Subspecies ==
These two subspecies belong to the species Calliopsis hesperia:

- Calliopsis hesperia equina (Cockerell, 1925)
- Calliopsis hesperia hesperia
