= Calliopsis scitula =

Scientific classification
- Kingdom: Animalia
- Phylum: Arthropoda
- Clade: Pancrustacea
- Class: Insecta
- Order: Hymenoptera
- Family: Andrenidae
- Genus: Calliopsis
- Species: C. scitula

Binomial name
- Calliopsis scitula Cresson, 1878

Species of bee

The charming miner bee (Calliopsis scitula) is a species of miner bee in the family Andrenidae. It is found in Central America and North America.

== Subspecies ==
These two subspecies belong to the species Calliopsis scitula:

- Calliopsis scitula lawae (Michener, 1937);
- Calliopsis scitula scitula.
