= Calliopsis pugionis =

Scientific classification
- Kingdom: Animalia
- Phylum: Arthropoda
- Class: Insecta
- Order: Hymenoptera
- Family: Andrenidae
- Genus: Calliopsis
- Species: C. pugionis

Binomial name
- Calliopsis pugionis Cockerell, 1925

Species of bee

Calliopsis pugionis is a species of mining bee in the family Andrenidae. It is found in North America.
