= Calliopsis zonalis =

Scientific classification
- Domain: Eukaryota
- Kingdom: Animalia
- Phylum: Arthropoda
- Class: Insecta
- Order: Hymenoptera
- Family: Andrenidae
- Genus: Calliopsis
- Species: C. zonalis

Binomial name
- Calliopsis zonalis Cresson, 1879

Species of bee

Calliopsis zonalis is a species of bee in the family Andrenidae. It is found in North America.

== Subspecies ==
These two subspecies belong to the species Calliopsis zonalis:

- Calliopsis zonalis sierrae (Rozen, 1958)
- Calliopsis zonalis zonalis
