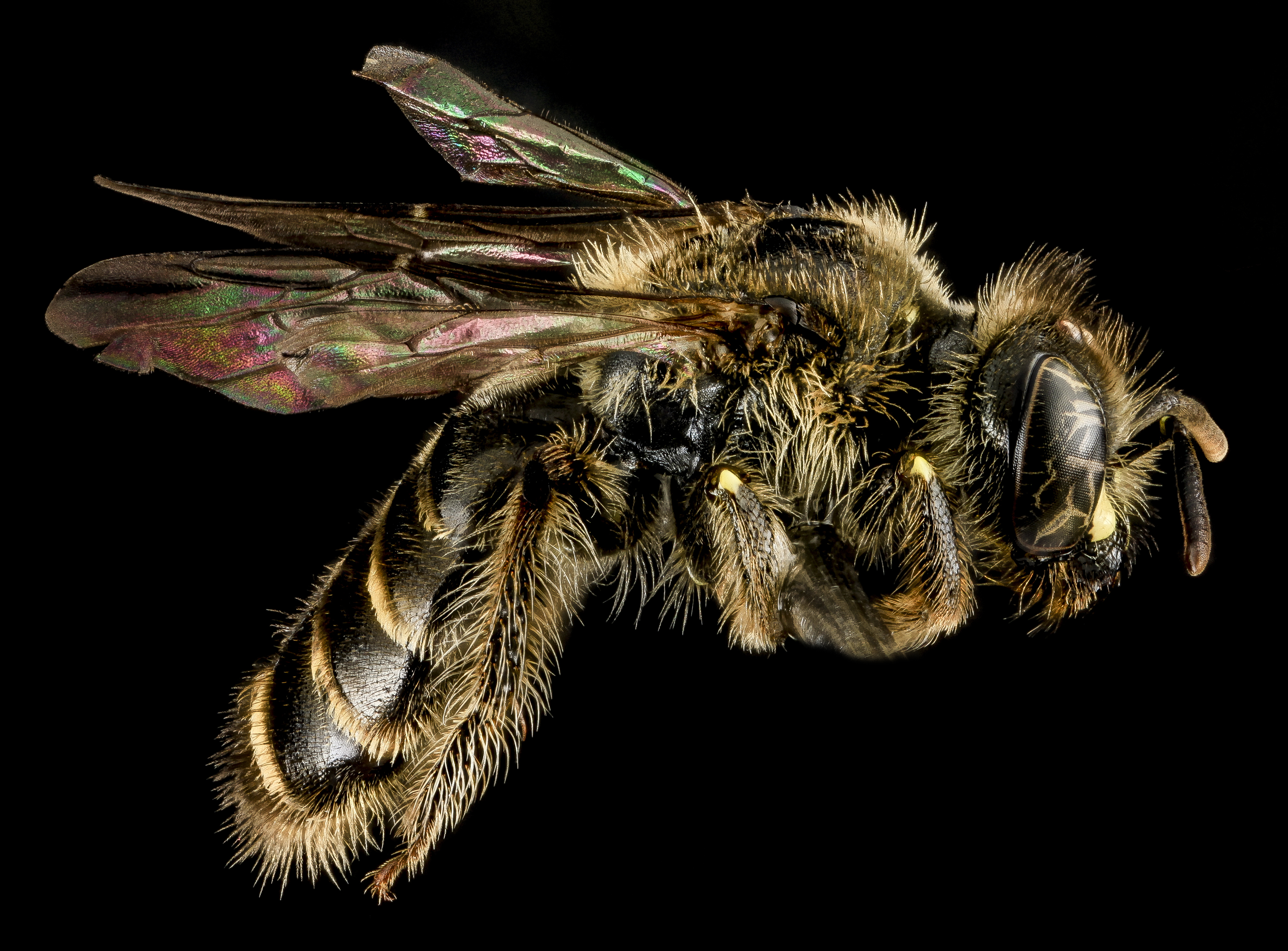
- Calliopsis andreniformis, female

Scientific classification
- Domain: Eukaryota
- Kingdom: Animalia
- Phylum: Arthropoda
- Class: Insecta
- Order: Hymenoptera
- Family: Andrenidae
- Subfamily: Panurginae
- Tribe: Calliopsini
- Genus: Calliopsis; Smith, 1853

Subgenera
- Calliopsis Smith, 1853; Calliopsima Shinn, 1967; Ceroliopoeum Ruz, 1991; Hypomacrotera Cockerell & Porter, 1899; Liopoeodes Ruz, 1991; Liopoeum Friese, 1906; Micronomadopsis Rozen, 1958; Nomadopsis Ashmead, 1898; Perissander Michener, 1942; Verbenapis Cockerell & Atkins, 1902

Synonyms
- Claremontiella Cockerell, 1933; Macronomadopsis Rozen, 1958

= Calliopsis (bee) =

Genus of bees

Calliopsis is a genus of panurgine bees in the family Andrenidae. There are over 80 described species distributed throughout the western hemisphere.

== Description ==
Calliopsis are small dark bees, often with yellow or white markings, especially in males. Calliopsis andreniformis have green eyes, and males of the species have bright yellow faces and legs.

== Mating ==
Male Calliopsis fly close to the ground and, in one species, many of them evidently copulate with only a single female. Mating takes place on flowers and at nest sites. Calliopsis also are univoltine, which means they only have one brood of offspring a year.

== Nesting ==
Nearly all female Calliopsis are solitary nesters, but they locate nests within aggregations with other females. Nests are built in the form of horizontal tunnels connected to waterproofed chambers containing eggs and provisions stored by the mother bee. Each female digs a solitary underground nest, usually in compacted, dense soil and close to flowering plants that serve as food sources. Calliopsis nesting aggregations can be as dense as 1,650 nests/m^2.

The nest tunnels measure 7.5 mm maximum diameter and 13 mm long. Calliopsis bees build their nest the way they do to mitigate competition between males. Their nest is built for waterproof hazards to keep the soil dry until the ground evaporates. Although reported in a few other bee groups, Calliopsis are unusual in that some species' nests can survive complete submersion: Calliopsis pugionis emerged from nests that had been underwater for at least 3 months.

== Species ==
These 88 species belong to the genus Calliopsis.

- Calliopsis andreniformis Smith, 1853 - eastern miner bee
- Calliopsis anomoptera Michener, 1942
- Calliopsis anthidia Fowler, 1899
- Calliopsis argentina Jörgensen, 1912
- Calliopsis australior Cockerell, 1897
- Calliopsis azteca Shinn, 1967
- Calliopsis barbata Timberlake, 1952
- Calliopsis barri Rozen, 1959
- Calliopsis beamerorum Rozen, 1963
- Calliopsis bernardinensis Michener, 1937
- Calliopsis boharti Rozen, 1958
- Calliopsis callops Cockerell & Porter, 1899
- Calliopsis callosa Timberlake, 1952
- Calliopsis cazieri Rozen, 1958
- Calliopsis chlorops Cockerell, 1899 - green-tinted miner bee
- Calliopsis cincta Cresson, 1879
- Calliopsis coloradensis Cresson, 1878 - Colorado miner bee
- Calliopsis coloratipes Cockerell, 1898
- Calliopsis comptula Cockerell, 1916
- Calliopsis crypta Shinn, 1965
- Calliopsis deserticola Shinn, 1967
- Calliopsis edwardsii Cresson, 1878
- Calliopsis empelia Shinn, 1967
- Calliopsis filiorum Rozen, 1963
- Calliopsis flavifrons Smith, 1853
- Calliopsis foleyi Timberlake, 1952
- Calliopsis fracta Rozen, 1952
- Calliopsis fulgida Shinn, 1967
- Calliopsis gilva Shinn, 1967
- Calliopsis granti Shinn, 1967
- Calliopsis helenae Shinn, 1967
- Calliopsis helianthi Swenk & Cockerell, 1907
- Calliopsis hesperia Swenk & Cockerell, 1907
- Calliopsis hirsutifrons Cockerell, 1896
- Calliopsis hirsutula Spinola, 1851
- Calliopsis hondurasica Cockerell, 1949
- Calliopsis hurdiella Shinn & Engel, 2003
- Calliopsis interrupta Provancher, 1888
- Calliopsis kucalumea Shinn, 1967
- Calliopsis laeta Vachal, 1909
- Calliopsis larreae Timberlake, 1952
- Calliopsis limbus Shinn, 1967
- Calliopsis linsleyi Rozen, 1958
- Calliopsis macswaini Rozen, 1958
- Calliopsis meliloti Cockerell, 1896
- Calliopsis mellipes Timberlake, 1952
- Calliopsis mendocina Jörgensen, 1912
- Calliopsis michenerella Shinn & Engel, 2003
- Calliopsis micheneri Rozen, 1958
- Calliopsis mourei Shinn, 1967
- Calliopsis nebraskensis Crawford, 1902
- Calliopsis nigromaculata Timberlake, 1952
- Calliopsis obscurella Cresson, 1879
- Calliopsis pectidis Shinn, 1965
- Calliopsis peninsularis Shinn, 1967
- Calliopsis persimilis Cockerell, 1899
- Calliopsis personata Cockerell, 1897
- Calliopsis phaceliae Timberlake, 1952
- Calliopsis philiphunteri Shinn & Engel, 2003
- Calliopsis puellae Cockerell, 1933
- Calliopsis pugionis Cockerell, 1925
- Calliopsis quadridentata Shinn, 1967
- Calliopsis quadrilineata Provancher, 1888
- Calliopsis rhodophila Cockerell, 1897
- Calliopsis rogeri Shinn, 1967
- Calliopsis rozeni Shinn, 1965
- Calliopsis scitula Cresson, 1878 - charming miner bee
- Calliopsis scutellaris Fowler, 1899
- Calliopsis smithi Rozen, 1958
- Calliopsis snellingi Rozen, 1963
- Calliopsis solitaria Rozen, 1963
- Calliopsis sonora Shinn, 1967
- Calliopsis sonorana Timberlake, 1969
- Calliopsis squamifera Timberlake, 1947
- Calliopsis subalpina Cockerell, 1894
- Calliopsis syphar Shinn, 1967
- Calliopsis teucrii Cockerell, 1899
- Calliopsis timberlakei Rozen, 1958
- Calliopsis trifasciata Spinola, 1851
- Calliopsis trifolii Timberlake, 1952
- Calliopsis unca Shinn, 1967
- Calliopsis verbenae Cockerell & Porter, 1899
- Calliopsis xenopous Ruz, 1991
- Calliopsis xenus Rozen, 1958
- Calliopsis yalea Shinn, 1967
- Calliopsis zebrata Cresson, 1878 - streaked miner bee
- Calliopsis zonalis Cresson, 1879
- Calliopsis zora Shinn, 1967
