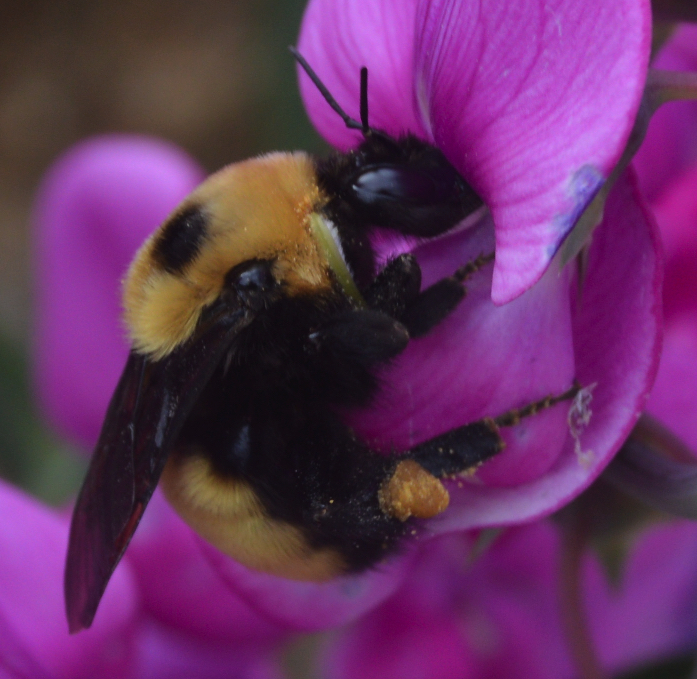

Conservation status
- Least Concern (IUCN 3.1)

Scientific classification
- Kingdom: Animalia
- Phylum: Arthropoda
- Clade: Pancrustacea
- Class: Insecta
- Order: Hymenoptera
- Family: Apidae
- Genus: Bombus
- Subgenus: Bombias
- Species: B. nevadensis

Binomial name
- Bombus nevadensis (Cresson, 1874)

= Bombus nevadensis =

Species of bee

Bombus nevadensis, the Nevada bumblebee, is a species of bumblebee. It is native to North America, where it occurs from Alaska to California in the west, and east to Wisconsin, and in Arizona, New Mexico, and Mexico.

== Description ==
A bumblebee with a long proboscis (tongue) and a short, dense fur, the females (queens and workers) have an entirely black head, while the face and top of the head of the male are yellow. The thorax is yellow, sometimes with a hairless, black spot in the middle. The three first terga (abdominal segments) are yellow, while the rest of the abdomen is black. However, the tip of the tail is more or less red in the male. The average body length is 20 mm (0.79 in) for the queen, 17 mm (0.67 in) (worker) and 14 mm (0.55 in) (male).

The black and gold bumblebee (Bombus auricomus) is sometimes considered a subspecies of this species, B. nevadensis auricomus. Genetic and morphological evidence supports them as separate species.

== Ecology ==
This species inhabits open areas such as prairies and meadows. It usually nests underground. Food plants include milkvetches, thistles, melilots, bergamot, penstemons, phacelias, salvias, betony, and clovers.
