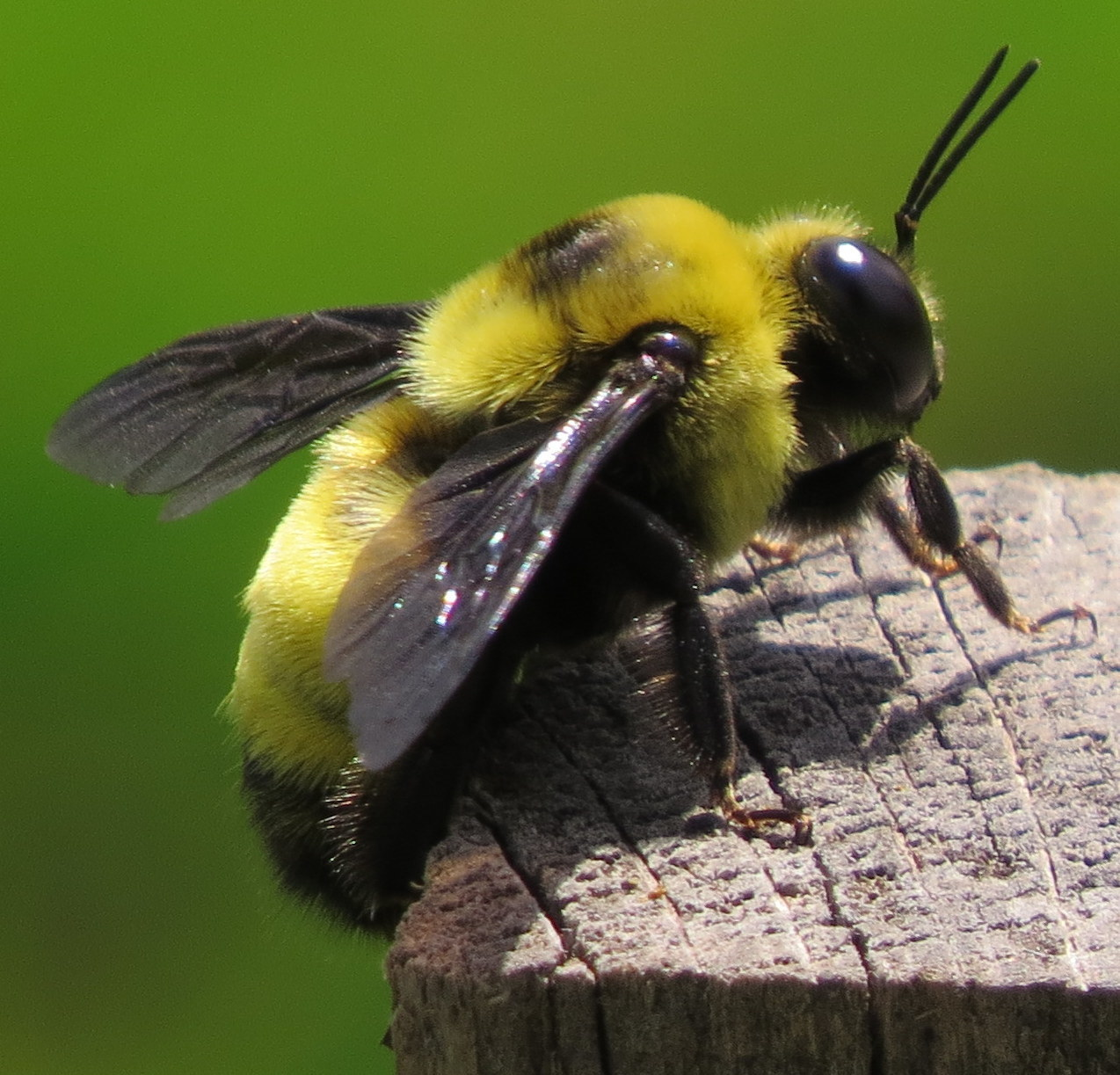

Conservation status
- Least Concern (IUCN 3.1)

Scientific classification
- Kingdom: Animalia
- Phylum: Arthropoda
- Class: Insecta
- Order: Hymenoptera
- Family: Apidae
- Genus: Bombus
- Subgenus: Bombias
- Species: B. auricomus

Binomial name
- Bombus auricomus (Robertson, 1903)

= Bombus auricomus =

Species of bee

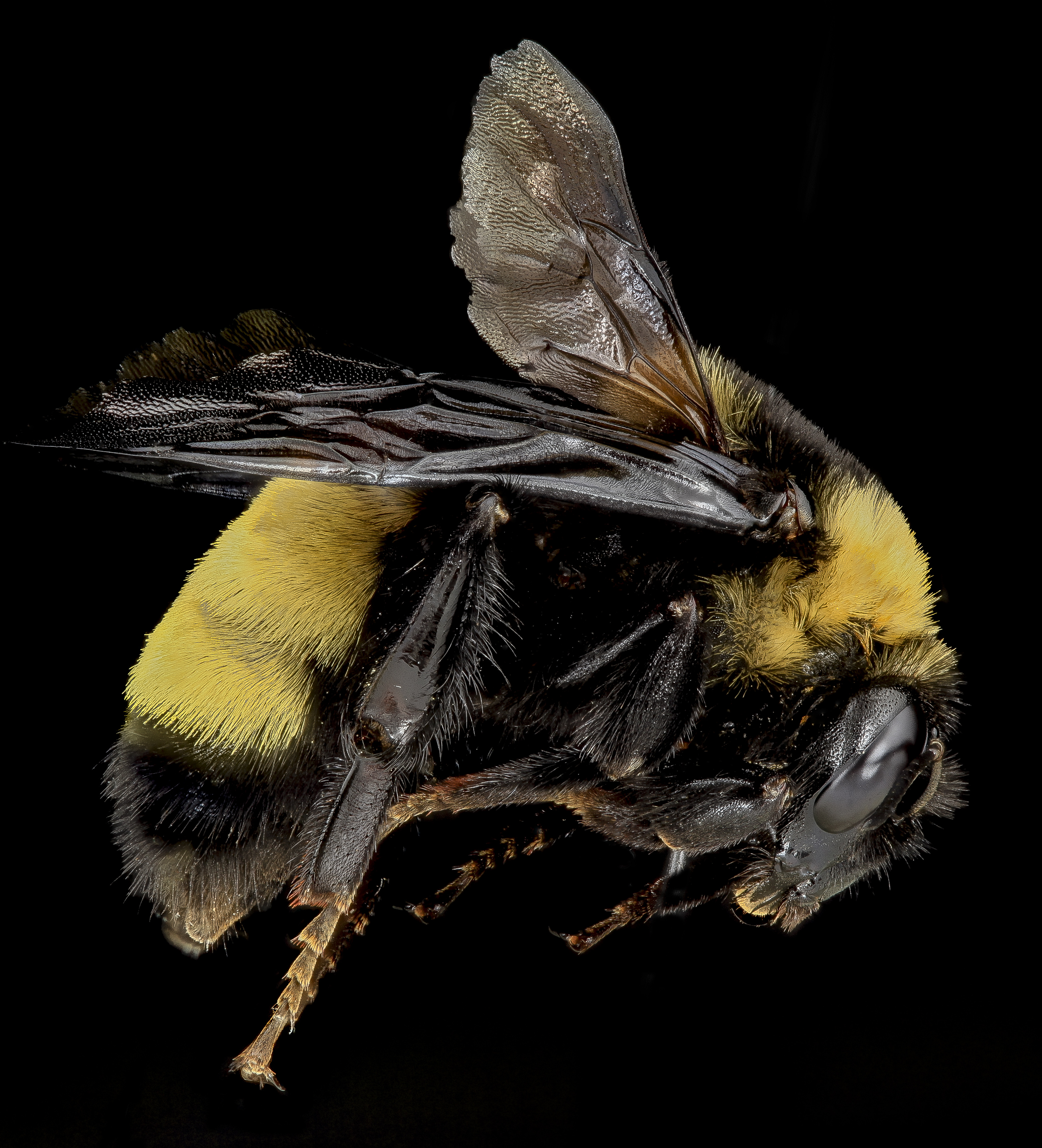
Specimen

Bombus auricomus is a species of bumblebee known by the common name black and gold bumblebee. It is native to eastern North America, including Ontario in Canada and much of the eastern United States, as far west as the Great Plains.

This species creates above-ground nests in grassland and other open habitat types. It feeds at many types of plants, including thistles, prairie clovers, delphiniums, teasels, echinacea, bergamot, penstemons, clovers, and vetches.

This is a fairly large bumblebee; workers and males are about 1.7 to 2.0 cm long, while queens can be up to 2.5 cm in length.

This bee was previously thought to be conspecific with the Nevada bumblebee (B. nevadensis), but the two are now considered separate species.
