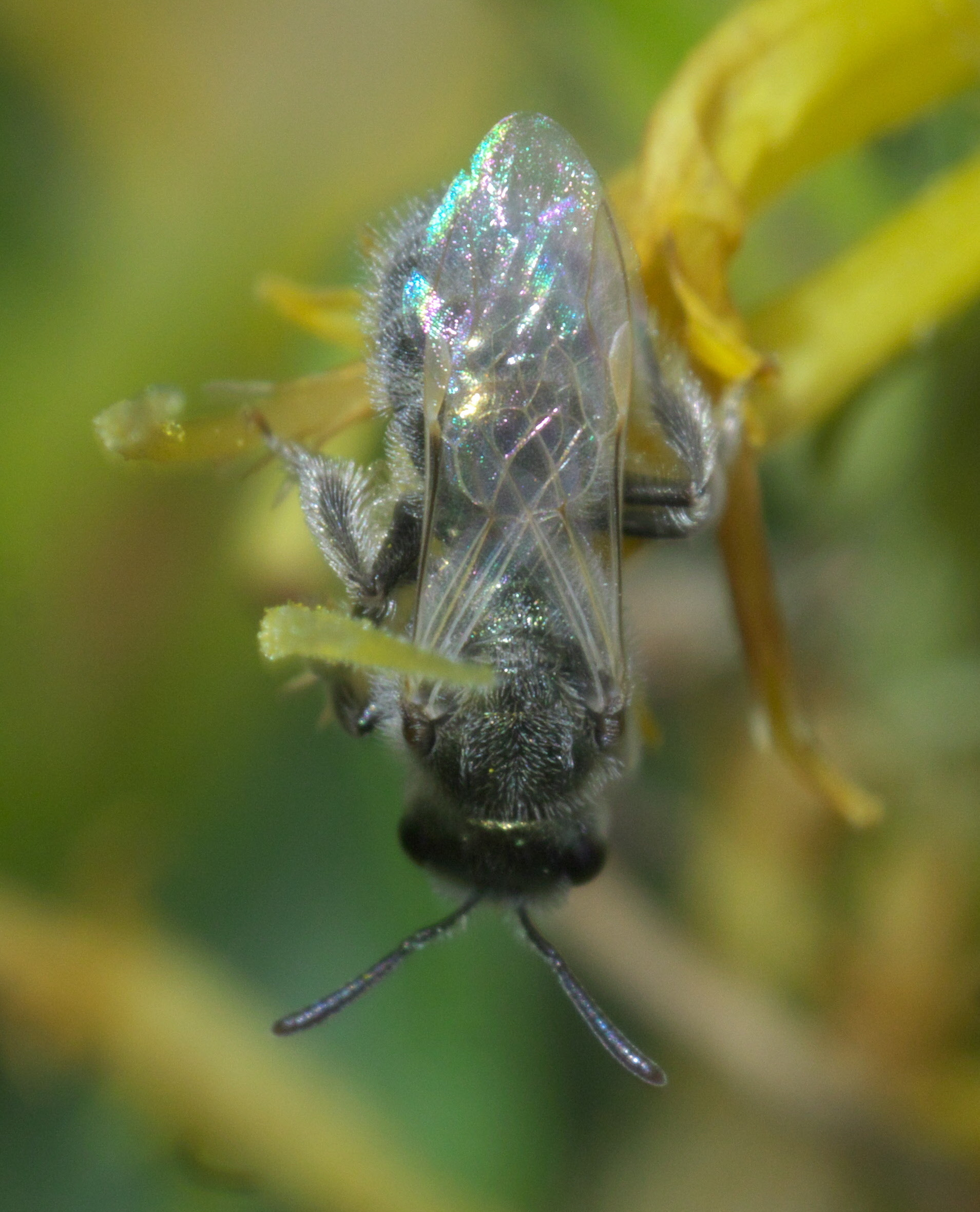

Scientific classification
- Kingdom: Animalia
- Phylum: Arthropoda
- Class: Insecta
- Order: Hymenoptera
- Family: Halictidae
- Tribe: Halictini
- Genus: Lasioglossum
- Species: L. semicaeruleum

Binomial name
- Lasioglossum semicaeruleum (Cockerell, 1895)

= Lasioglossum semicaeruleum =

Species of bee

Lasioglossum semicaeruleum is a species of sweat bee in the family Halictidae.

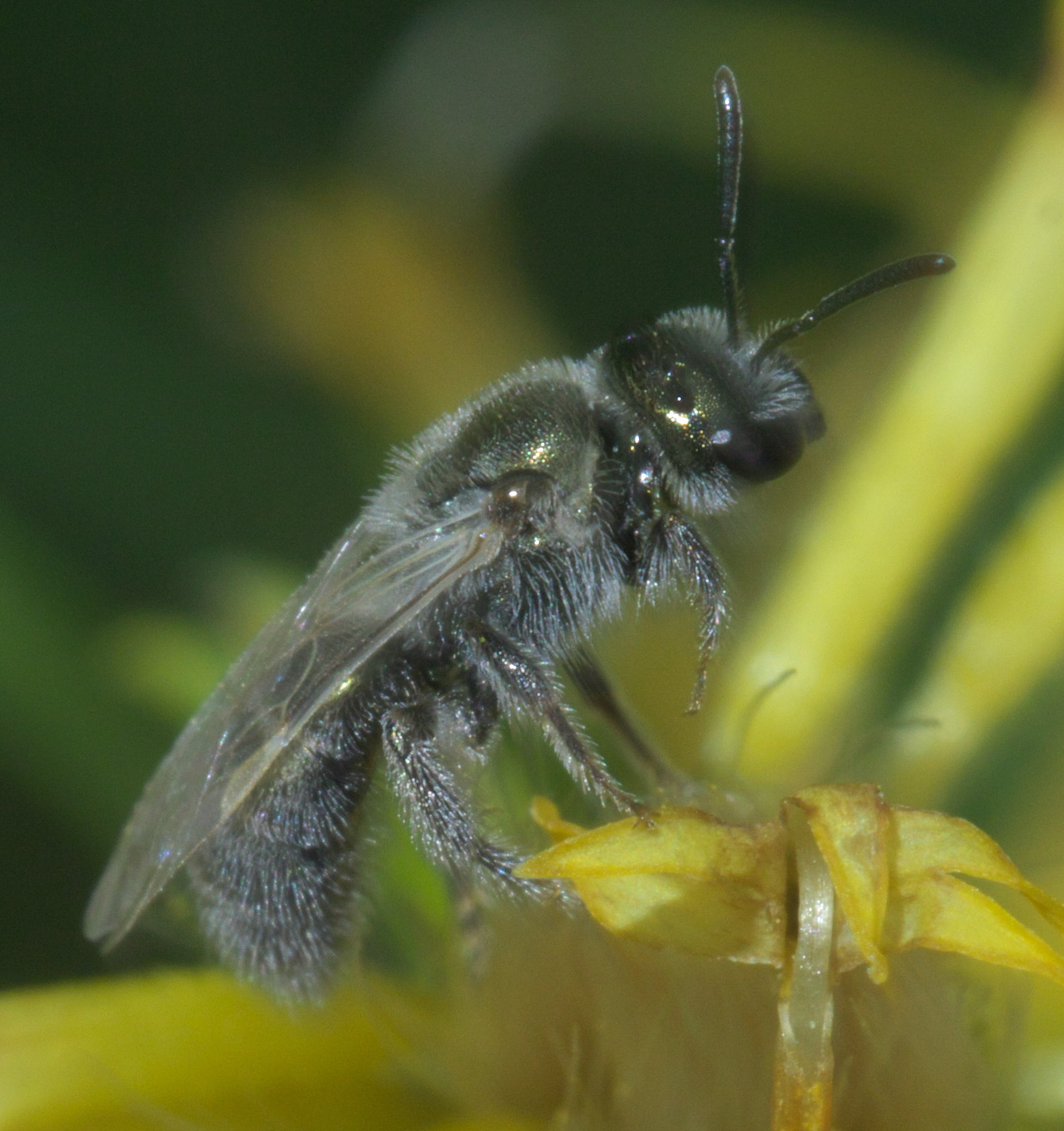
