= Calliopsis zebrata =

Scientific classification
- Domain: Eukaryota
- Kingdom: Animalia
- Phylum: Arthropoda
- Class: Insecta
- Order: Hymenoptera
- Family: Andrenidae
- Genus: Calliopsis
- Species: C. zebrata

Binomial name
- Calliopsis zebrata Cresson, 1878

Species of bee

The streaked miner bee (Calliopsis zebrata) is a species of miner bee in the family Andrenidae. It is found in North America.

== Subspecies ==
These two subspecies belong to the species Calliopsis zebrata:

- Calliopsis zebrata bobbae (Rozen, 1958)
- Calliopsis zebrata zebrata
