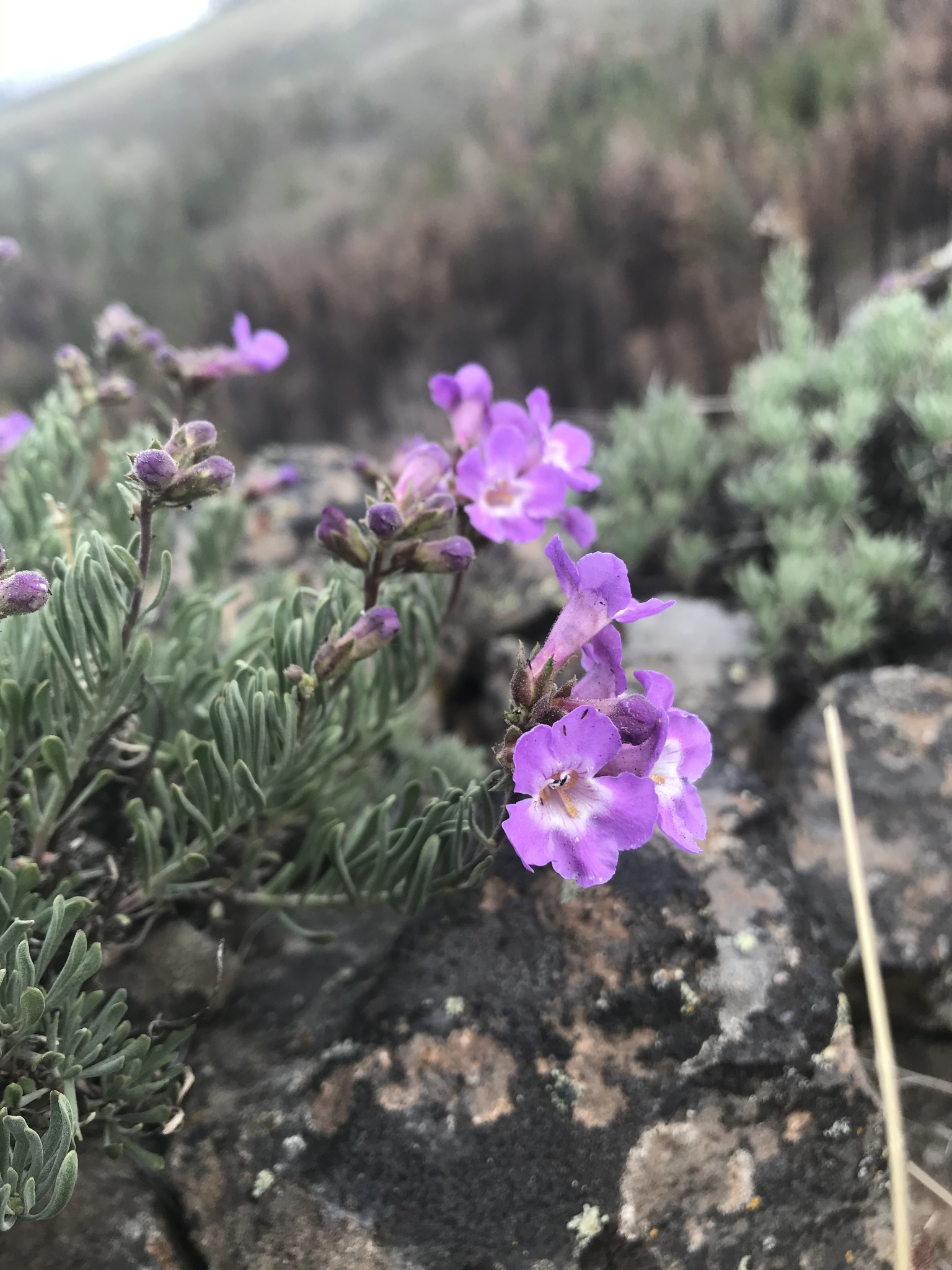
- Wenas Wildlife Area, Yakima County, Washington

Conservation status
- Apparently Secure (NatureServe)

Scientific classification
- Kingdom: Plantae
- Clade: Tracheophytes
- Clade: Angiosperms
- Clade: Eudicots
- Clade: Asterids
- Order: Lamiales
- Family: Plantaginaceae
- Genus: Penstemon
- Species: P. gairdneri

Binomial name
- Penstemon gairdneri Hook.

Varieties
- P. gairdneri var. gairdneri; P. gairdneri var. oreganus A.Gray

= Penstemon gairdneri =

Plant species in the veronica family

Penstemon gairdneri is a species of perennial plant in the Plantaginaceae family with the common name Gairdner's beardtongue. It is native to Washington, Oregon, and Idaho in the western United States.

== Description ==
Penstemon gairdneri is a subshrub, a plant with somewhat woody stems especially towards their base. It has flower-bearing stems that grow upright or out a short distance before curving to grow upwards from a branched, woody caudex, reaching 6 to 40 centimeters in height. The stems are covered in stiff backwards facing hairs and are not glaucous, covered in natural waxes. It also often has short densely-leafy stems lacking flowers that form an open basal mat. During the winter the leaves are deciduous, usually including the ones at the base, leaving the stems an unclothed mound of sticks.

The leaves are numerous and are both basal and cauline, attached directly to the base of the plant or to the stems. Leaves are not leathery and can be attached to stems alternately or mostly in pairs on opposite sides of the stems. The basal leaves the lowest ones on the stems are 1 to 7 centimeters long and just 1 to 4 millimeters wide. They may be spatulate, oblanceolate, or linear in shape; like spoons, reversed spear heads, or narrow and resembling those of grass. When opposite stems will have eight to twelve pairs of leaves, when alternating there will be 13 to 25 in total. Leaves higher up the plant are just 7 to 35 mm long and only 1 to 3 mm wide. The edges of the leaves are smooth, but revolute, rolled downward.

The showy flowers are part of a loose inflorescence with three to twelve groups of flowers. Each group has a pair of peduncles, unusually with one flower each, but occasionally branched with two flowers. They have a tubular throat that flares into 5 petal-like segments that are almost flat. The inside of the tube is pale blue to white while the outside may be blue, violet, or lavender. The flowers may be marked with nectar guide lines or lack them.

== Taxonomy ==
Penstemon gairdneri is in the Penstemon genus in family Plantaginaceae. The botanist William Jackson Hooker published the first scientific description for the species and named it Penstemon gairdneri in 1838.

=== Varieties ===
The species has two accepted varieties:

==== Penstemon gairdneri var. gairdneri ====
The autonymic variety grows in eastern Oregon and central Washington. It differs from variety oreganus by always having alternating leaves and typically being shorter, only rarely reaching 35 centimeters (14 in) and more often having stems 6 to 20 cm (2.5 to 8 in) long.

==== Penstemon gairdneri var. oreganus ====
This variety was described by Asa Gray in 1886. It grows in eastern Oregon and central Idaho. The leaves of this variety are normally attached to opposite sides of the stems and also has stems that are longer on average, reaching 20 to 40 cm (8 to 16 in).

=== Synonyms ===
Penstemon gairdneri has 7 synonyms of the species or one of its varieties.

Table of Synonyms
| Name | Year | Rank | Synonym of: | Notes |
|---|---|---|---|---|
| Penstemon gairdneri subsp. hians (Piper) D.D.Keck | 1940 | subspecies | var. gairdneri | = het. |
| Penstemon gairdneri var. hians Piper | 1900 | variety | var. gairdneri | = het. |
| Penstemon gairdneri subsp. oreganus (A.Gray) D.D.Keck | 1940 | subspecies | var. oreganus | ≡ hom. |
| Penstemon gairdneri subsp. typicus D.D.Keck | 1940 | subspecies | P. gairdneri | ≡ hom. not validly publ. |
| Penstemon hians I.M.Johnst. | 1923 | species | var. gairdneri | = het. |
| Penstemon oreganus (A.Gray) Howell | 1901 | species | var. oreganus | ≡ hom. |
| Penstemon puberulentus Rydb. | 1917 | species | var. oreganus | = het. |
Notes: ≡ homotypic synonym; = heterotypic synonym

=== Names ===
The scientific name of the species, gairdneri, was selected to honor Dr Meredith Gairdner by Hooker. He was a naturalist and surgeon who was acquainted with Hooker and David Douglas in the Hudson's Bay Company settlement on the Columbia River in the Oregon Country. In English it is most commonly called Gairdner's penstemon. It is also sometimes known as rock penstemon, however it shares this common name with Penstemon rupicola.

== Range and habitat ==
The range of Penstemon gairdneri as a species extends from north central Washington state in Okanogan County southward to Oregon, growing east of the Cascade Range. In Oregon it grows through much eastern of Oregon from Wasco and Lake counties east to Idaho. There it mainly grows in an area from Idaho County south to Canyon County, but with an isolated occurrence to the east in Butte County.

Penstemon gairdneri grows in open dry habitats at low to moderate elevation in hills and mountains. It reaches juniper and ponderosa pine forests. It is also associated with open sagebrush deserts and the Channeled Scablands on the Columbia Plateau. It may be found at elevations of 100 to 1,800 meters (300 to 5,900 ft).

=== Conservation ===
Penstemon gairdneri was evaluated by the conservation organization NatureServe in 1988. At that time, they rated it as apparently secure (G4). They did not evaluate it at the state level.

== See also ==
- List of Penstemon species

== Gallery ==
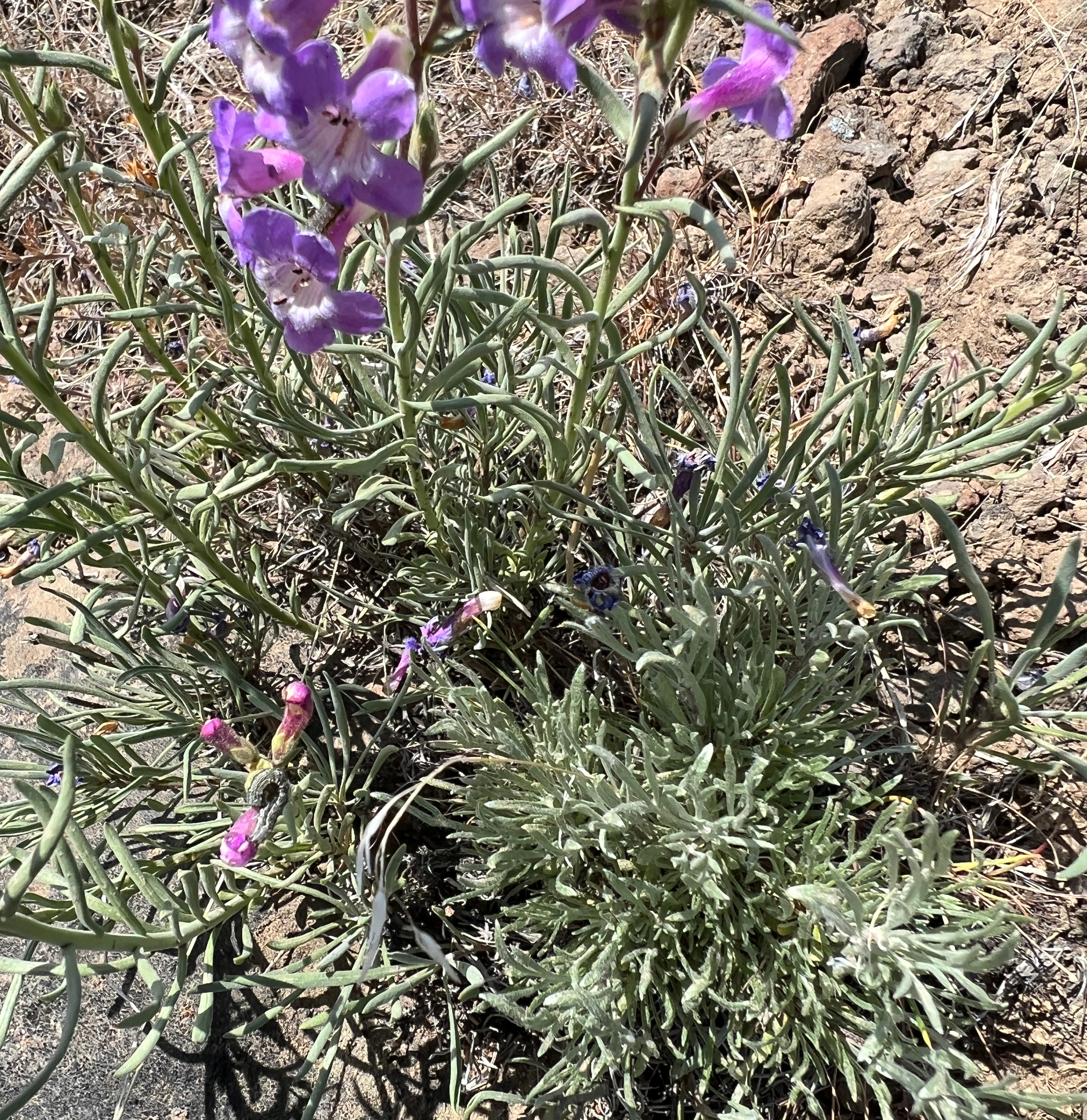
Tall flower-bearing stems and basal sterile stems
