= Calliopsini =

- Calliopsis sp., female

Scientific classification
- Domain: Eukaryota
- Kingdom: Animalia
- Phylum: Arthropoda
- Class: Insecta
- Order: Hymenoptera
- Family: Andrenidae
- Subfamily: Panurginae
- Tribe: Calliopsini; Robertson, 1922

Tribe of bees

Calliopsini is a tribe of mining bees in the family Andrenidae. There are at least 120 described species in Calliopsini.

== Genera ==
- Acamptopoeum Cockerell, 1905
- Arhysosage Brèthes, 1922
- Calliopsis Smith, 1853
- Callonychium Brèthes, 1922
- Litocalliopsis Roig-Alsina & Compagnucci, 2003
- Spinoliella Ashmead, 1899
