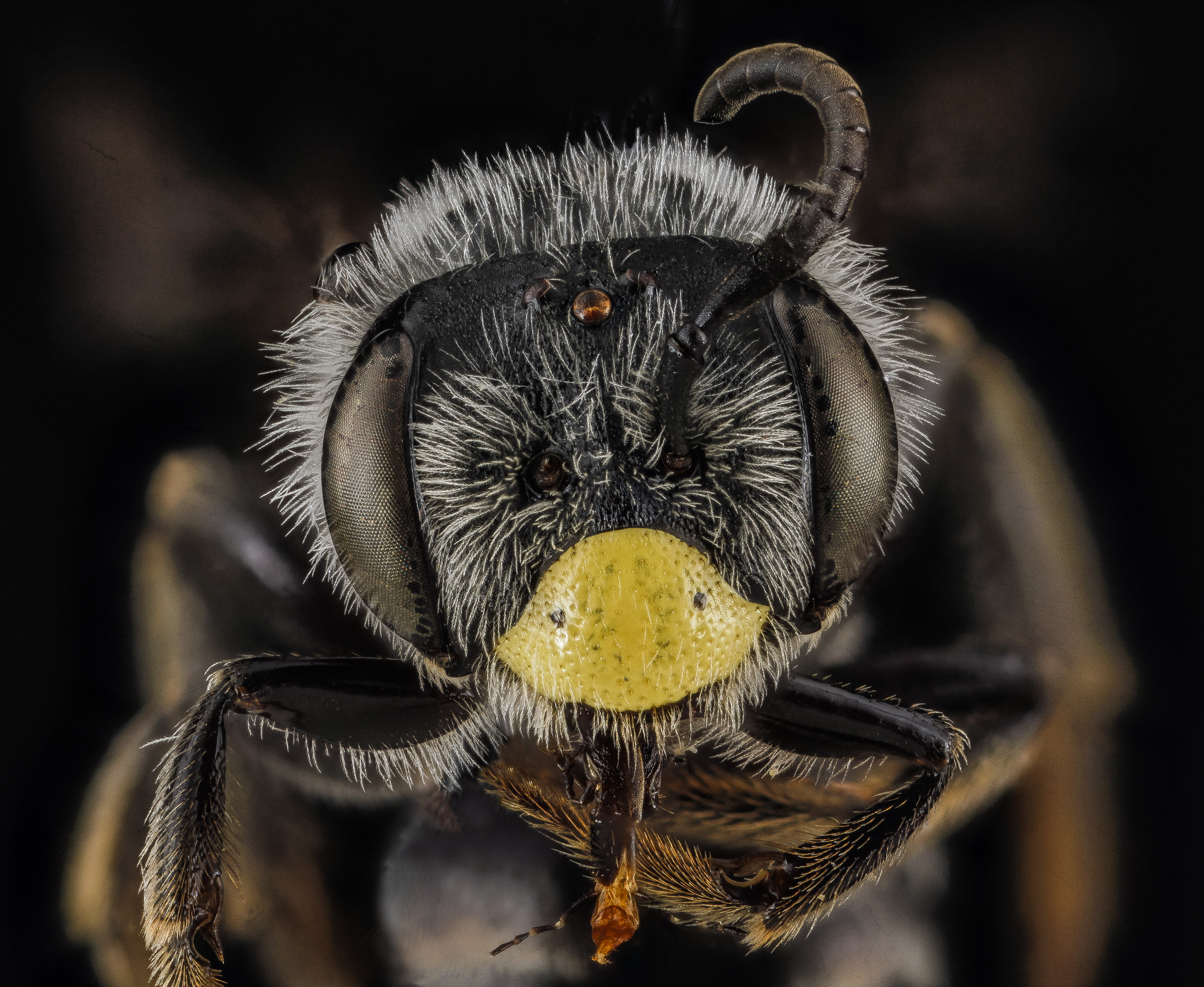
- Male

Scientific classification
- Domain: Eukaryota
- Kingdom: Animalia
- Phylum: Arthropoda
- Class: Insecta
- Order: Hymenoptera
- Family: Andrenidae
- Genus: Andrena
- Subgenus: Andrena (Callandrena)
- Species: A. aliciae

Binomial name
- Andrena aliciae Robertson, 1891

= Andrena aliciae =

Miner bee species in the family Andrenidae

Andrena aliciae, the yellow-faced miner bee, is a species of miner bee in the family Andrenidae. It is native to North America.

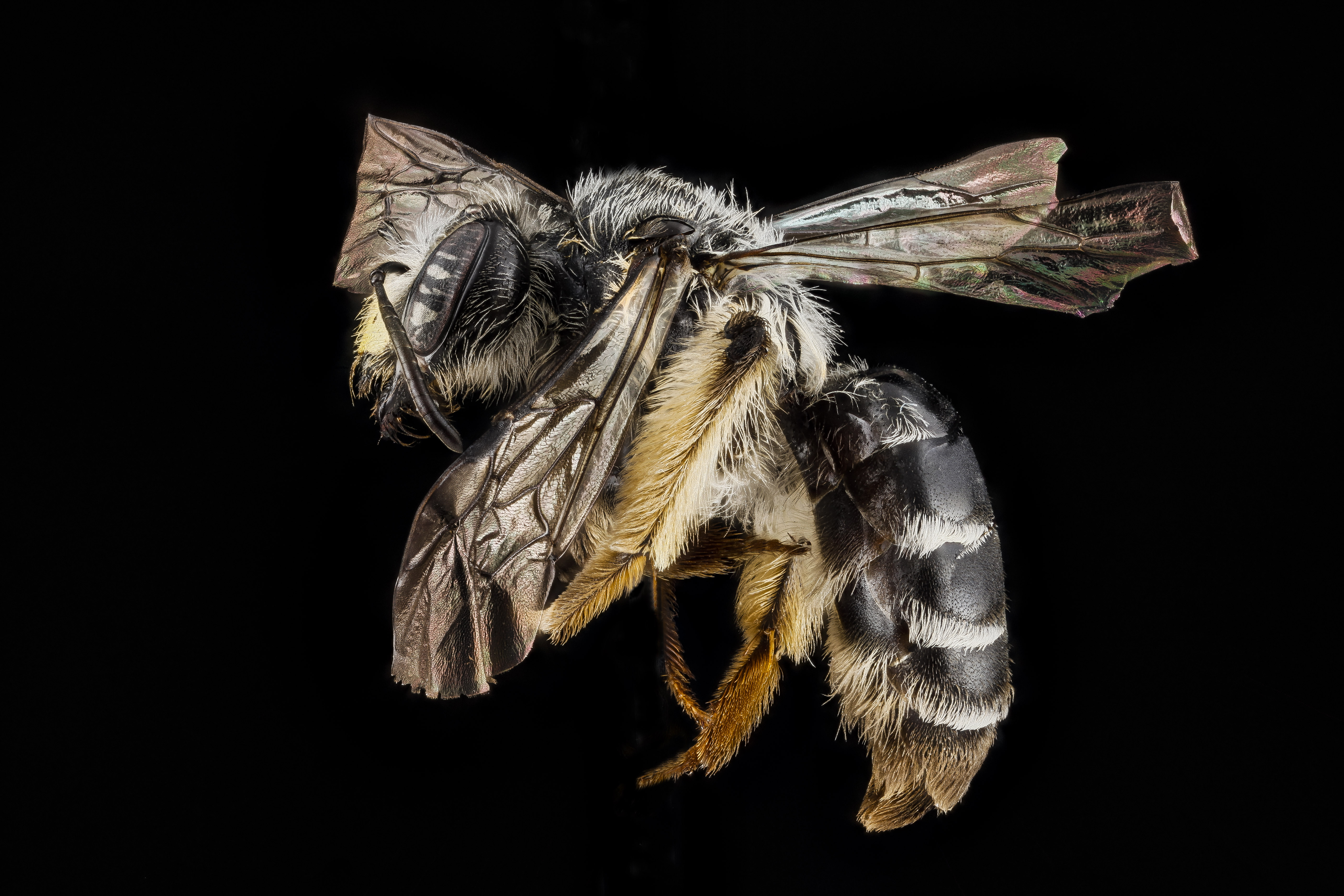
Female

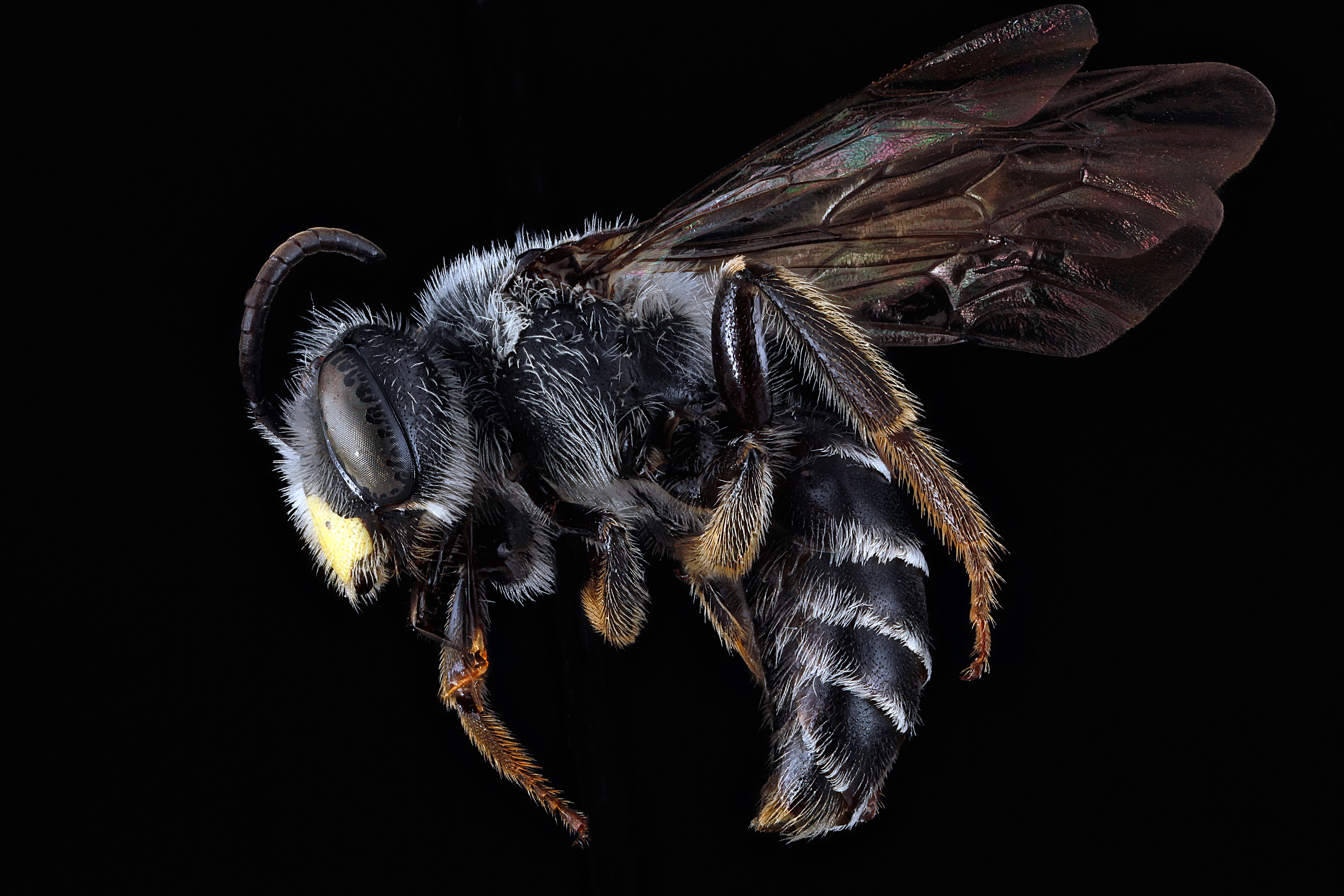
Male

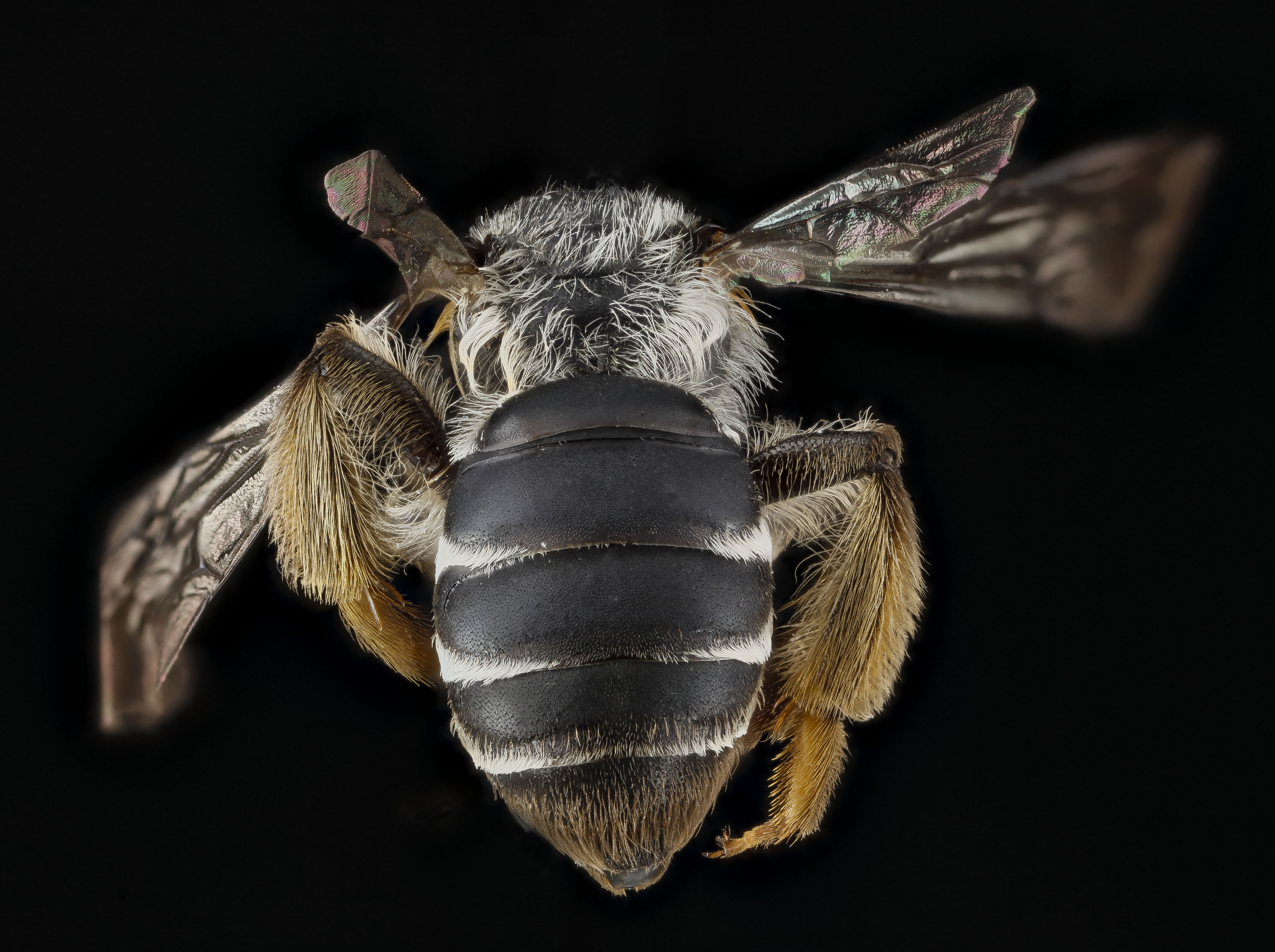
Posterior view of a female
