= A. bradleyi =

A. bradleyi may refer to:

- Andrena bradleyi, a bee
- Anopheles bradleyi, a mosquito of the southeastern United States
- Asplenium bradleyi, a fern of the east-central United States
