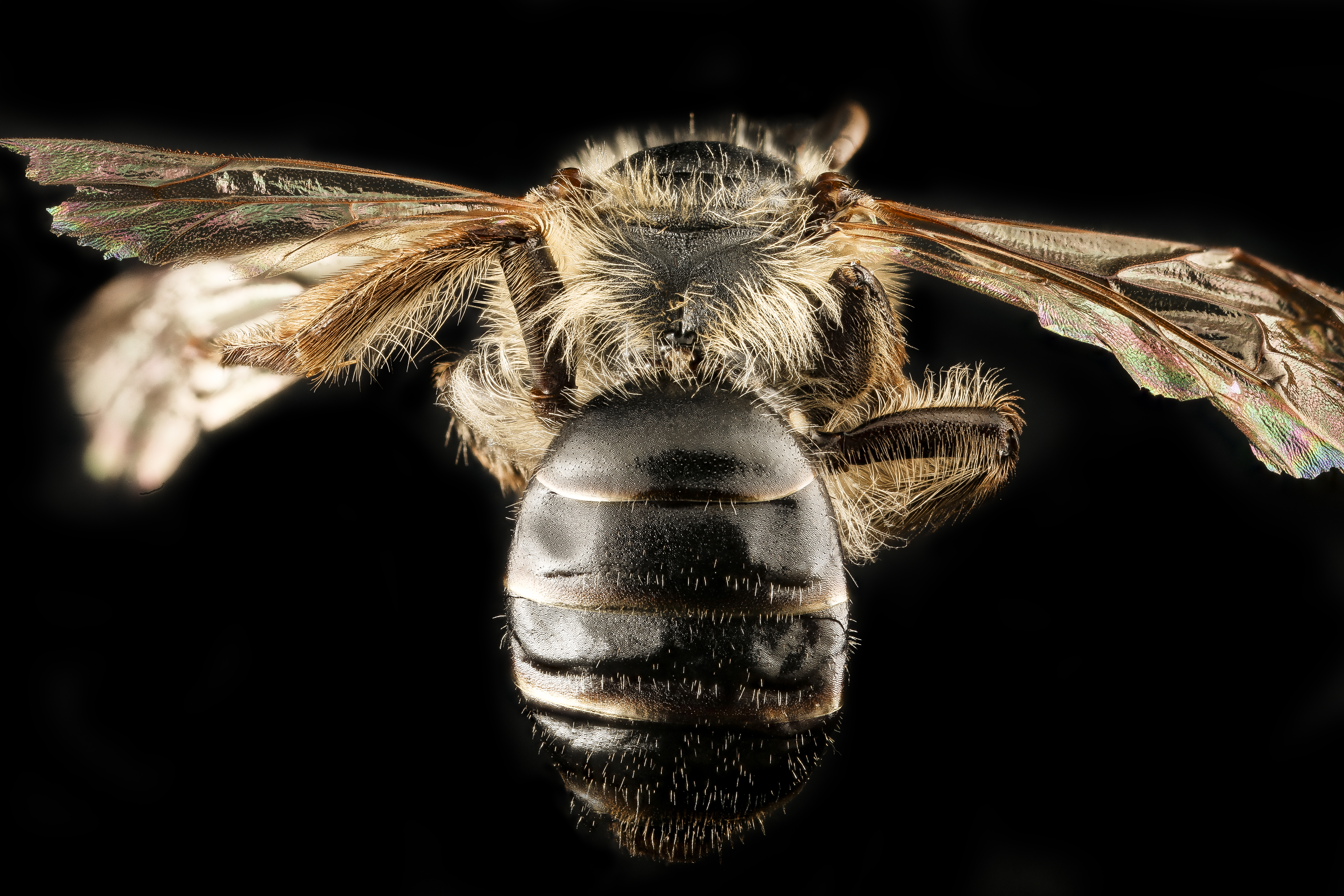

Scientific classification
- Domain: Eukaryota
- Kingdom: Animalia
- Phylum: Arthropoda
- Class: Insecta
- Order: Hymenoptera
- Family: Andrenidae
- Genus: Andrena
- Species: A. bradleyi

Binomial name
- Andrena bradleyi Viereck, 1907

= Andrena bradleyi =

Species of bee

The Bradley's miner bee (Andrena bradleyi) is a species of miner bee in the family Andrenidae. Another common name for this species is Bradley's andrena. It is found in North America.
