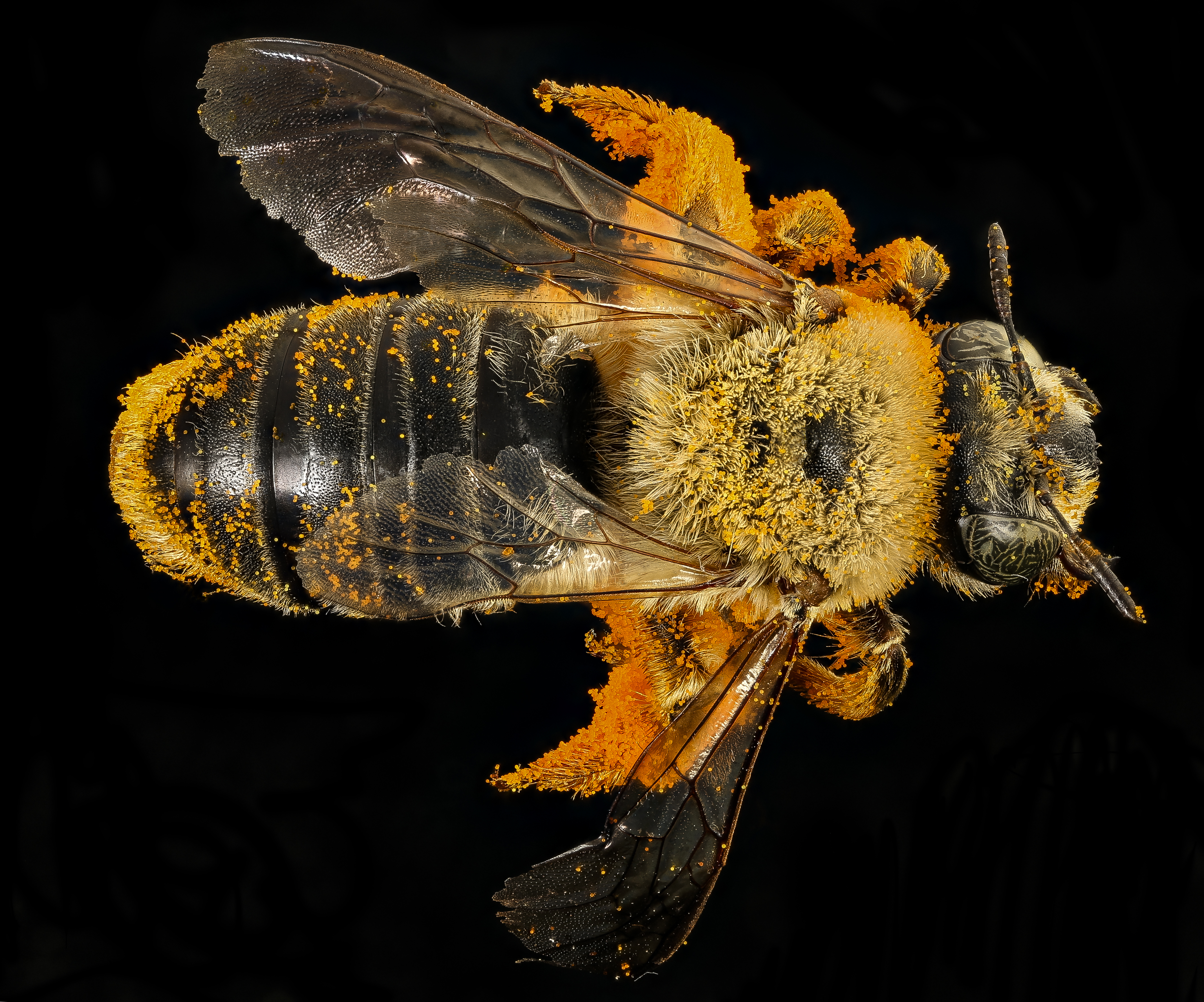

Scientific classification
- Kingdom: Animalia
- Phylum: Arthropoda
- Class: Insecta
- Order: Hymenoptera
- Family: Andrenidae
- Genus: Protoxaea
- Species: P. gloriosa

Binomial name
- Protoxaea gloriosa (Fox, 1893)

= Protoxaea gloriosa =

Species of bee

Protoxaea gloriosa, the glorious protoxaea, is a species of bee in the family Andrenidae. It is found in Central America and North America.
