= List of Crabronidae genera =

This is a list of the 110 extant genera in the Crabronidae, a family in the order Hymenoptera (249 genera were considered in the Crabronidae sensu lato before being split into multiple families).

== Subfamily Crabroninae ==
=== Tribe Bothynostethini ===
==== Subtribe Bothynostethina ====
- Bothynostethus Kohl, 1884^{i c g}
- Sanaviron Vardy, 1987^{i c g}
- Willinkiella Menke, 1968^{i c g}

==== Subtribe Scapheutina ====
- Bohartella Menke, 1968^{i c g}
- Scapheutes Handlirsch, 1887^{i c g}

=== Tribe Crabronini ===
==== Subtribe Anacrabronina ====
- Anacrabro Packard, 1866^{i c g b}
- Encopognathus Kohl, 1897^{i c g}
- Entomocrabro Kohl, 1905^{i c g}
- Entomognathus Dahlbom, 1844^{i c g}

==== Subtribe Crabronina ====
- Alinia Antropov, 1993^{i c g}
- Arnoldita Pate, 1948^{i c g}
- Chimila Pate, 1944^{i c g}
- Chimiloides Leclercq, 1951^{i c g}
- Crabro Fabricius, 1775^{i c g b}
- Crossocerus Lepeletier de Saint Fargeau & Brullé, 1835^{i c g b}
- Dasyproctus Lepeletier de Saint Fargeau and Brullé, 1835^{i c g}
- Echucoides Leclercq, 1957^{i c g}
- Ectemnius Dahlbom, 1845^{i c g b}
- Enoplolindenius Rohwer, 1911^{i c g}
- Eupliloides Pate, 1946^{i c g}
- Foxita Pate, 1942^{i c g}
- Hingstoniola Turner and Waterston, 1926^{i c g}
- Holcorhopalum Cameron, 1904^{i c g}
- Huacrabro Leclercq, 2000^{i c g}
- Huavea Pate, 1948^{i c g}
- Isorhopalum Leclercq, 1963^{i c g}
- Krombeinictus Leclercq, 1996^{i c g}
- Leclercqia Tsuneki, 1968^{i c g}
- Lecrenierus Leclercq, 1977^{i c g}
- Lestica Billberg, 1820^{i c g b}
- Lindenius Lepeletier de Saint Fargeau and Brullé, 1835^{i c g}
- Minicrabro Leclercq, 2003^{i c g}
- Moniaecera Ashmead, 1899^{i c g b}
- Neodasyproctus Arnold, 1926^{i c g}
- Notocrabro Leclercq, 1951^{i c g}
- Odontocrabro Tsuneki, 1971^{i c g}
- Pae Pate, 1944^{i c g}
- Papurus Tsuneki, 1983^{i c g}
- Parataruma Kimsey, 1982^{i c g}
- Pericrabro Leclercq, 1954^{i c g}
- Piyuma Pate, 1944^{i c g}
- Piyumoides Leclercq, 1963^{i c g}
- Podagritoides Leclercq, 1957^{i c g}
- Podagritus Spinola, 1851^{i c g}
- Pseudoturneria Leclercq, 1954^{i c g}
- Quexua Pate, 1942^{i c g}
- Rhopalum Stephens, 1829^{i c g b}
- Tracheliodes A. Morawitz, 1866^{i c g}
- Tsunekiola Antropov, 1986^{i c g}
- Vechtia Pate, 1944^{i c g}
- Williamsita Pate, 1947^{i c g}
- Zutrhopalum Leclercq, 1998^{i c g}

=== Tribe Oxybelini ===
- Belarnoldus Antropov, 2007^{i c g}
- Belokohlus Antropov, 2007^{i c g}
- Belomicrinus Antropov, 2000^{i c g}
- Belomicroides Kohl, 1899^{i c g}
- Belomicrus A. Costa, 1867^{i c g b}
- Brimocelus Arnold, 1927^{i c g}
- Enchemicrum Pate, 1929^{i c g}
- Gessus Antropov, 2001^{i c g}
- Guichardus Antropov, 2007^{i c g}
- Minimicroides Antropov, 2000^{i c g}
- Nototis Arnold, 1927^{i c g}
- Oxybelochardus Hamodee & Shafeeq, 2023
- Oxybelomorpha Brauns, 1897^{i c g}
- Oxybelus Latreille, 1797^{i c g b}
- Pseudomicroides Antropov, 2001^{i c g}
- Wojus Antropov, 1999^{i c g}

=== Tribe Larrini ===
==== Subtribe Gastrosericina ====
- Gastrosericus Spinola, 1839^{i c g}
- Holotachysphex de Beaumont, 1940^{i c g}
- Kohliella Brauns, 1910^{i c g}
- Larropsis Patton, 1892^{i c g b}
- Parapiagetia Kohl, 1897^{i c g}
- Prosopigastra A. Costa, 1867^{i c g}
- Tachysphex Kohl, 1883^{i c g b}
- Tachytella Brauns, 1906^{i c g}
- Tachytes Panzer, 1806^{i c g b}

==== Subtribe Larrina ====
- Dalara Ritsema, 1884^{i c g}
- Dicranorhina Shuckard, 1840^{i c g}
- Larra Fabricius, 1793^{i g b} (mole cricket hunters)
- Liris Fabricius, 1804^{i c g b}
- Megalara Kimsey and Ohl, 2012^{i c g}
- Paraliris Kohl, 1884^{i c g}

=== Tribe Miscophini ===
- Aha Menke, 1977^{i c g}
- Auchenophorus R. Turner, 1907^{i c g}
- Larrissa Pulawski, 2012^{i c g}
- Larrisson Menke, 1967^{i c g}
- Lyroda Say, 1837^{i c g b}
- Miscophoidellus Menke in Bohart and Menke, 1976^{i c g}
- Miscophoides Brauns in Kohl, 1897^{i c g}
- Miscophus Jurine, 1807^{i c g b}
- Namiscophus Lomholdt, 1985^{i c g}
- Nitela Latreille, 1809^{i c g}
- Paranysson Guérin-Méneville, 1844^{i c g}
- Plenoculus W. Fox, 1893^{i c g b}
- Saliostethoides Arnold, 1924^{i c g}
- Saliostethus Brauns in Kohl, 1897^{i c g}
- Sericophorus F. Smith, 1851^{i c g}
- Solierella Spinola, 1851^{i c g b}
- Sphodrotes Kohl, 1889^{i c g}

=== Tribe Palarini ===
- Mesopalarus Brauns, 1899^{i c g}
- Palarus Latreille, 1802^{i c g}

=== Tribe Trypoxylini ===
- Aulacophilinus Lomholdt, 1980^{i c g}
- Aulacophilus F. Smith, 1869^{i c g}
- Entomopison Menke, 1968^{i g}
- Pison Jurine in Spinola, 1808^{i c g b}
- Pisonopsis W. Fox, 1893^{i c g b}
- Pisoxylon Menke, 1968^{i c g}
- Trypoxylon Latreille, 1796^{i c g b}

== Subfamily Dinetinae ==
- Dinetus Panzer, 1806^{i c g}

Data sources: i = ITIS, c = Catalogue of Life, g = GBIF, b = Bugguide.net
