= List of Oxybelus species =

This is a list of 268 species in Oxybelus, a genus of square-headed wasps in the family Crabronidae.

== Oxybelus species ==
- Oxybelus abdominalis C. Baker, 1896^{i c g}
- Oxybelus acutissimus Bischoff, 1912^{i c g}
- Oxybelus adductus Kazenas, 1994^{i c g}
- Oxybelus admissus Kazenas, 1990^{i c g}
- Oxybelus aestuosus Bingham, 1897^{i c g}
- Oxybelus aethiopicus Cameron, 1906^{i c g}
- Oxybelus aganis R. Bohart, 1993^{i c g}
- Oxybelus agilis F. Smith, 1856^{i c g}
- Oxybelus albipes F. Morawitz, 1894^{i c g}
- Oxybelus albofasciatus Kazenas, 2001^{i c g}
- Oxybelus albopictus Radoszkowski, 1877^{i c g}
- Oxybelus alexanderi Kazenas, 2004^{i c g}
- Oxybelus alhumdalilleri Guichard, 1990^{i c g}
- Oxybelus americanus Spinola, 1842^{i c g}
- Oxybelus amoenus Kazenas, 1994^{i c g}
- Oxybelus analis Cresson, 1865^{i c g}
- Oxybelus andinus Brèthes, 1913^{i c g}
- Oxybelus angustus de Saussure, 1892^{i c g}
- Oxybelus antropovi Kazenas, 2004^{i c g}
- Oxybelus arabicus Guichard, 1990^{i c g}
- Oxybelus argentatus Curtis, 1833^{i c g}
- Oxybelus argenteopilosus Cameron, 1891^{i c g}
- Oxybelus argentinus Brèthes, 1913^{i c g}
- Oxybelus argypheus R. Bohart and Schlinger, 1956^{i c g}
- Oxybelus arnoldi Benoit, 1951^{i c g}
- Oxybelus aurantiacus Mocsáry, 1883^{i c g}
- Oxybelus aurifrons F. Smith, 1856^{i c g}
- Oxybelus ayuttayanus Tsuneki, 1974^{i c g}
- Oxybelus aztecus Cameron, 1891^{i c g}
- Oxybelus bareii Radoszkowski, 1893^{i c g}
- Oxybelus bechuanae Arnold, 1936^{i c g}
- Oxybelus bicornutus Arnold, 1929^{i c g}
- Oxybelus bipunctatus Olivier, 1812^{i c g b}
- Oxybelus braunsi Arnold, 1927^{i c g}
- Oxybelus brethesi R. Bohart, 1993^{i c g}
- Oxybelus californicus R. Bohart and Schlinger, 1956^{i c g}
- Oxybelus callani Pate, 1943^{i c g}
- Oxybelus canaliculatus Radoszkowski, 1877^{i c g}
- Oxybelus canalis R. Bohart and Schlinger, 1956^{i c g}
- Oxybelus canescens Cameron, 1890^{i c g}
- Oxybelus carinatus Gussakovskij, 1933^{i c g}
- Oxybelus catamarcensis (Schrottky, 1909)^{i c g}
- Oxybelus caucasicus Radoszkowski, 1893^{i c g}
- Oxybelus chilensis Reed, 1894^{i c g}
- Oxybelus cinemucro R. Bohart, 1993^{i c g}
- Oxybelus citrinulus Gussakovskij, 1952^{i c g}
- Oxybelus citrinus Radoszkowski, 1893^{i c g}
- Oxybelus clandestinus Kohl, 1905^{i c g}
- Oxybelus cocacolae P. Verhoeff, 1968^{i c g}
- Oxybelus cochise Pate, 1943^{i c g}
- Oxybelus cocopa Pate, 1943^{i c g}
- Oxybelus collaris Kohl, 1884^{i c g}
- Oxybelus coloratus R. Bohart, 1993^{i c g}
- Oxybelus concinnus Stephens, 1829^{i c g}
- Oxybelus confusus Alayo Dalmau, 1968^{i c g}
- Oxybelus congophilus Benoit, 1951^{i c g}
- Oxybelus coniferus Arnold, 1951^{i c g}
- Oxybelus continuus Dahlbom, 1845^{i c g}
- Oxybelus cordatus Spinola, 1851^{i c g}
- Oxybelus cordiformis Gussakovskij, 1952^{i c g}
- Oxybelus cornutus C. Robertson, 1889^{i c g}
- Oxybelus crandalli R. Bohart and Schlinger, 1956^{i c g}
- Oxybelus cressonii C. Robertson, 1889^{i c g b}
- Oxybelus cristatus de Saussure, 1892^{i c g}
- Oxybelus curviscutis Arnold, 1927^{i c g}
- Oxybelus cyaneus R. Bohart, 1993^{i c g}
- Oxybelus decoris R. Bohart, 1993^{i c g}
- Oxybelus decorosus (Mickel, 1916)^{i c g}
- Oxybelus diphyllus (A. Costa, 1882)^{i c g}
- Oxybelus dissectus Dahlbom, 1845^{i c g}
- Oxybelus dissimilis Arnold, 1934^{i c g}
- Oxybelus dusmeti Mingo Pérez, 1966^{i c g}
- Oxybelus eburneoguttatus Arnold, 1952^{i c g}
- Oxybelus eburneus Radoszkowski, 1877^{i c g}
- Oxybelus elongatus Radoszkowski, 1877^{i c g}
- Oxybelus emarginatus Say, 1837^{i c g b}
- Oxybelus exclamans Viereck, 1906^{i c g}
- Oxybelus eximius Spinola, 1894^{i c g}
- Oxybelus fedtschenkoi Radoszkowski, 1877^{i c g}
- Oxybelus fischeri Spinola, 1839^{i c g}
- Oxybelus fissus Lepeletier de Saint Fargeau, 1845^{c g}
- Oxybelus flagellifoveolalris X. Li and Q. Li, 2010^{i g}
- Oxybelus flagellifoveolaris X. Li and Q. Li, 2010^{c g}
- Oxybelus flavicornis Arnold, 1927^{i c g}
- Oxybelus flavigaster Kazenas, 2002^{i c g}
- Oxybelus flavipes Cameron, 1890^{i c g}
- Oxybelus flaviventris Arnold, 1927^{i c g}
- Oxybelus fossor Rohwer and Cockerell, 1908^{i c g}
- Oxybelus fraternus R. Bohart, 1993^{i c g}
- Oxybelus fraudulentus Arnold, 1940^{i c g}
- Oxybelus fritzi R. Bohart, 1993^{i c g}
- Oxybelus frontis R. Bohart, 1993^{i c g}
- Oxybelus fulvicaudis Cameron, 1908^{i c g}
- Oxybelus fulvopilosus Cameron, 1890^{i c}
- Oxybelus funereus Krombein, 1982^{i c g}
- Oxybelus furcifer R. Turner, 1917^{i c g}
- Oxybelus furculatus Manikandan, Dey and Farooqi, 1998^{i c g}
- Oxybelus fuscohirtus Gussakovskij, 1930^{i c g}
- Oxybelus fuscus Krombein, 2001^{i c g}
- Oxybelus genisei R. Bohart, 1993^{i c g}
- Oxybelus glasunowi F. Morawitz, 1894^{i c g}
- Oxybelus gobiensis Tsuneki, 1972^{i c g}
- Oxybelus gracilissimus Kazenas, 1990^{i c g}
- Oxybelus guichardi de Beaumont, 1950^{i c g}
- Oxybelus haemorrhoidalis Olivier, 1812^{i c g}
- Oxybelus harraricus Arnold, 1927^{i c g}
- Oxybelus hastatus Fabricius, 1804^{i c g}
- Oxybelus hessei Arnold, 1929^{i c g}
- Oxybelus huae R. Bohart, 1993^{i c g}
- Oxybelus hurdi R. Bohart and Schlinger, 1956^{i c g}
- Oxybelus imperialis Gerstaecker, 1867^{i c g}
- Oxybelus inornatus (C. Robertson, 1901)^{i c g}
- Oxybelus insularis Kohl, 1884^{i c g}
- Oxybelus irwini R. Bohart, 1993^{i c g}
- Oxybelus iwatai Tsuneki, 1976^{i c g}
- Oxybelus jamaicae R. Bohart, 1993^{i c g}
- Oxybelus kirgisicus Radoszkowski, 1893^{i c g}
- Oxybelus kizilkumii Radoszkowski, 1877^{i c g}
- Oxybelus koreanus Tsuneki, 1974^{i c g}
- Oxybelus krombeini R. Bohart and Schlinger, 1956^{i c g}
- Oxybelus laetus Say, 1837^{i c g}
- Oxybelus lamellatus Olivier, 1811^{i c g}
- Oxybelus lanceolatus Gerstaecker, 1867^{i c g}
- Oxybelus latidens Gerstaecker, 1867^{g}
- Oxybelus latifrons Kohl, 1892^{i c g}
- Oxybelus latilineatus Cameron, 1908^{i c g}
- Oxybelus latro Olivier, 1812^{i c g}
- Oxybelus lepturus Arnold, 1927^{i c g}
- Oxybelus lewisi Cameron, 1890^{i c g}
- Oxybelus limatus Arnold, 1927^{i c g}
- Oxybelus lineatus (Fabricius, 1787)^{i c g}
- Oxybelus linguifer R. Turner, 1917^{i c g}
- Oxybelus lingula Gerstaecker, 1867^{i c g}
- Oxybelus linsleyi R. Bohart and Schlinger, 1956^{i c g}
- Oxybelus lubricus de Beaumont, 1950^{i c g}
- Oxybelus macswaini R. Bohart and Schlinger, 1956^{i c g}
- Oxybelus maculipes F. Smith, 1856^{i c g}
- Oxybelus maidlii Kohl, 1924^{i c g}
- Oxybelus major Mickel, 1916^{i c g}
- Oxybelus malaysianus Tsuneki, 1974^{i c g}
- Oxybelus manaliensis Manikandan, Dey and Farooqi, 1999^{i}
- Oxybelus mandibularis Dahlbom, 1845^{i c g}
- Oxybelus maracandicus Radoszkowski, 1877^{i c g}
- Oxybelus marginatus F. Smith, 1856^{i c g}
- Oxybelus marginellus Spinola, 1851^{i c g}
- Oxybelus marginicollis Gussakovskij, 1933^{i c g}
- Oxybelus matabele Arnold, 1927^{i c g}
- Oxybelus melanitus R. Bohart, 1993^{i c g}
- Oxybelus mendozae R. Bohart, 1993^{i c g}
- Oxybelus menoni Manikandan, Dey and Farooqi, 1998^{i c g}
- Oxybelus merwensis Radoszkowski, 1893^{i c g}
- Oxybelus metopias Kohl, 1894^{i c g}
- Oxybelus mexicanus C. Robertson, 1889^{i c g}
- Oxybelus mimeticus R. Bohart, 1992^{i c g}
- Oxybelus minutissimus F. Morawitz, 1892^{i c g}
- Oxybelus moczari Tsuneki, 1972^{i c g}
- Oxybelus morrisoni R. Bohart, 1993^{i c g}
- Oxybelus mucronatus (Fabricius, 1793)^{i c g}
- Oxybelus nanus Bingham, 1897^{i c g}
- Oxybelus napoensis R. Bohart, 1993^{i c g}
- Oxybelus nasutus Bischoff, 1913^{i c g}
- Oxybelus natalensis Arnold, 1927^{i c g}
- Oxybelus neuvillei Magretti, 1908^{i c g}
- Oxybelus niger C. Robertson, 1889^{i c g}
- Oxybelus nigrilamellatus X. Li and Q. Li, 2008^{i c g}
- Oxybelus nigritulus R. Turner, 1917^{i c g}
- Oxybelus nipponicus Tsuneki, 1966^{i c g}
- Oxybelus oasicola Tsuneki, 1972^{i c g}
- Oxybelus occitanicus Marquet, 1896^{i c g}
- Oxybelus osteni R. Bohart, 1993^{i c g}
- Oxybelus packardii C. Robertson, 1889^{i c g}
- Oxybelus paenemarginatus (Viereck, 1906)^{i c g}
- Oxybelus pallens Kazenas, 1990^{i c g}
- Oxybelus pallidus Arnold, 1927^{i c g}
- Oxybelus palmetorum de Beaumont, 1950^{i c g}
- Oxybelus paraagilis Manikandan, Dey and Farooqi, 1999^{i c g}
- Oxybelus paracochise R. Bohart and Schlinger, 1956^{i c g}
- Oxybelus paraguayensis Brèthes, 1909^{i c g}
- Oxybelus paramenoni Manikandan, Dey and Farooqi, 1998^{i c g}
- Oxybelus paratransiens Manikandan, Dey and Farooqi, 1999^{i c g}
- Oxybelus paratridentatus Manikandan, Dey and Farooqi, 1999^{i c g}
- Oxybelus parvus Cresson, 1865^{i c g}
- Oxybelus paucipunctatus Arnold, 1927^{i c g}
- Oxybelus pectoralis F. Morawitz, 1893^{i c g}
- Oxybelus penai R. Bohart, 1992^{i c g}
- Oxybelus peringueyi de Saussure, 1892^{i c g}
- Oxybelus perornatus Arnold, 1945^{i c g}
- Oxybelus peruensis R. Bohart, 1993^{i c g}
- Oxybelus peruvicus R. Bohart, 1993^{i c g}
- Oxybelus philippinensis Pate, 1938^{i c g}
- Oxybelus phyllophorus Kohl, 1898^{i c g}
- Oxybelus pictisentis Cameron, 1908^{i c g}
- Oxybelus pictus Arnold, 1927^{i c g}
- Oxybelus pilosus Arnold, 1927^{i c g}
- Oxybelus pitanta Pate, 1943^{i c g}
- Oxybelus platensis Brèthes, 1901^{i c g}
- Oxybelus plaumanni R. Bohart, 1993^{i c g}
- Oxybelus polyacanthus A. Costa, 1882^{i c g}
- Oxybelus polyceros Pate, 1943^{i c g}
- Oxybelus propodealis R. Bohart, 1993^{i c g}
- Oxybelus pulawskii Tsuneki, 1972^{i c g}
- Oxybelus pygidialis Gussakovskij, 1952^{i c g}
- Oxybelus pyrura (Rohwer, 1914)^{c g}
- Oxybelus pyrurus (Rohwer, 1914)^{i}
- Oxybelus quatuordecimnotatus Jurine, 1807^{i c g}
- Oxybelus rancocas Pate, 1943^{i c g}
- Oxybelus rejectus C. Baker, 1896^{i c g}
- Oxybelus rhodopyga R. Bohart, 1993^{i c g}
- Oxybelus robertsonii C. Baker, 1896^{i c g}
- Oxybelus robustus Cameron, 1890^{i c g}
- Oxybelus romingeri R. Bohart, 1993^{i c g}
- Oxybelus roraimae R. Bohart, 1993^{i c g}
- Oxybelus rubrocaudatus Arnold, 1927^{i c g}
- Oxybelus ruficaudis Cameron, 1905^{i c g}
- Oxybelus ruficornis F. Smith, 1856^{i c}
- Oxybelus rufopictus F. Morawitz, 1892^{i c g}
- Oxybelus sarafschani Radoszkowski, 1877^{i c g}
- Oxybelus schlingeri R. Bohart, 1993^{i c g}
- Oxybelus schusteri R. Bohart, 1993^{i c g}
- Oxybelus scutellatus R. Bohart, 1993^{i c g}
- Oxybelus sericeus C. Robertson, 1889^{i c g}
- Oxybelus similis Cresson, 1865^{i c g}
- Oxybelus slanskyae R. Bohart, 1993^{i c g}
- Oxybelus solitarius Arnold, 1927^{i c g}
- Oxybelus sparideus Cockerell, 1895^{i c g}
- Oxybelus spectabilis Gerstaecker, 1867^{i c g}
- Oxybelus spinulosus Gussakovskij, 1935^{i c g}
- Oxybelus stangei R. Bohart, 1993^{i c g}
- Oxybelus stevensoni Arnold, 1927^{i c g}
- Oxybelus strandi Yasumatsu, 1935^{i c g}
- Oxybelus subcornutus Cockerell, 1895^{i c g}
- Oxybelus subcristatus de Saussure, 1892^{i c g}
- Oxybelus subspinosus Klug in Waltl, 1835^{i c g}
- Oxybelus subtilis Gussakovskij, 1935^{i c g}
- Oxybelus subulatus C. Robertson, 1889^{i c g}
- Oxybelus suluensis Pate, 1938^{i c g}
- Oxybelus taenigaster (Viereck, 1906)^{i c g}
- Oxybelus taprobanensis Pate, 1930^{i c g}
- Oxybelus tarapacae R. Bohart, 1992^{i c g}
- Oxybelus tartagalae R. Bohart, 1993^{i c g}
- Oxybelus taschenbergi Kohl, 1884^{i c g}
- Oxybelus tengu Tsuneki, 1972^{i c g}
- Oxybelus thailanditus Tsuneki, 1974^{i c g}
- Oxybelus timberlakei R. Bohart and Schlinger, 1956^{i c g}
- Oxybelus tinklyi Guichard, 1990^{i c g}
- Oxybelus toroi R. Bohart, 1992^{i c g}
- Oxybelus transcaspicus Radoszkowski, 1888^{i c g}
- Oxybelus transiens R. Turner, 1917^{i c g}
- Oxybelus tricolor Gussakovskij, 1952^{i c g}
- Oxybelus tridentatus F. Smith, 1856^{i c g}
- Oxybelus trispinosus (Fabricius, 1787)^{i c g}
- Oxybelus tshardarensis Kazenas, 1994^{i c g}
- Oxybelus uniglumis (Linnaeus, 1758)^{i c g b}
- Oxybelus uralensis Tsuneki, 1976^{i c g}
- Oxybelus uturoae Cheesman, 1928^{i c g}
- Oxybelus vardyi R. Bohart, 1993^{i c g}
- Oxybelus varians F. Morawitz, 1891^{i c g}
- Oxybelus variegatus Wesmael, 1852^{i c g}
- Oxybelus ventralis W. Fox, 1894^{i c g}
- Oxybelus verhoeffi de Beaumont, 1950^{i c g}
- Oxybelus wasbaueri R. Bohart, 1993^{i c g}
- Oxybelus willinki R. Bohart, 1993^{i c g}
- Oxybelus willowmorensis Arnold, 1927^{i c g}
- Oxybelus woosnami Arnold, 1927^{i c g}
- Oxybelus xanthogaster Pate, 1938^{i c g}
- Oxybelus xerophilus R. Bohart and Schlinger, 1956^{i c g}
- Oxybelus zavattarii Guiglia, 1943^{i c g}
- Oxybelus zohnsteini Kazenas, 2004^{i c g}

Data sources: i = ITIS, c = Catalogue of Life, g = GBIF, b = Bugguide.net
