= List of Liris species =

This is a list of 310 species in the genus Liris.

== Liris species ==
- Liris abbreviatus (R. Turner, 1908)
- Liris abyssinicus (Arnold, 1933)
- Liris aciculatus (Cameron, 1905)
- Liris aedilis (F. Smith, 1858)
- Liris agilis (F. Smith, 1856)
- Liris agitatus (R. Turner, 1908)
- Liris alaris (de Saussure, 1892)
- Liris alberti (Arnold, 1944)
- Liris albopilosus Tsuneki, 1967
- Liris angustiventris (Arnold, 1923)
- Liris antaka (de Saussure, 1890)
- Liris anthracinus Kohl, 1892
- Liris anticus (F. Smith, 1856)
- Liris antilles (Krombein, 1953)
- Liris apicalis (W. Fox, 1896)
- Liris apicipennis (Cameron, 1889)
- Liris appendiculatus (Taschenberg, 1870)
- Liris argentatus (Palisot de Beauvois, 1811)
- Liris argenticauda (Cameron, 1889)
- Liris argentifrons (Cameron, 1889)
- Liris asymphonus Krombein and Shanks Gingras, 1984
- Liris aterrimus (F. Smith, 1856)
- Liris atratus (Spinola, 1805)
- Liris atripennis Tsuneki, 1982
- Liris atropos Gribodo, 1894
- Liris atrox Arnold, 1959
- Liris aurarius Tsuneki, 1983
- Liris aureohirtus Tsuneki, 1982
- Liris aurifrons (F. Smith, 1858)
- Liris aurulentus (Fabricius, 1787)
- Liris australis (de Saussure, 1854)
- Liris avellanipes (de Saussure, 1890)
- Liris baguionis Tsuneki, 1983
- Liris bakeri (F. Williams, 1928)
- Liris banoensis Tsuneki, 1983
- Liris basilissa (R. Turner, 1908)
- Liris beatus (Cameron, 1889)
- Liris bellus (Lepeletier de Saint Fargeau, 1845)
- Liris bembesianus (Bischoff, 1913)
- Liris bengalensis (Cameron, 1903)
- Liris bequaerti (Arnold, 1929)
- Liris bicolor (W.F. Kirby, 1900)
- Liris bidentatus (Arnold, 1923)
- Liris biroi Tsuneki, 1983
- Liris bismarckanus Tsuneki, 1982
- Liris borneanus Tsuneki, 1974
- Liris bradleyi (Maidl, 1925)
- Liris braueri Kohl, 1884
- Liris braunsi (Arnold, 1923)
- Liris bredoi Benoit, 1951
- Liris brunnipennis Arnold, 1945
- Liris caeruleipennis (Maidl, 1925)
- Liris cameroni Tsuneki, 1976
- Liris campestris (F. Smith, 1856)
- Liris carinatus Tsuneki, 1976
- Liris carolinensis Yasumatsu, 1941
- Liris cavicola Tsuneki, 1983
- Liris championi (Cameron, 1889)
- Liris cheesmanae Menke in R. Bohart and Menke, 1976
- Liris chrysobaptus (F. Smith, 1862)
- Liris chrysonotus (F. Smith, 1869)
- Liris ciliatus (F. Smith, 1856)
- Liris claripennis Tsuneki, 1982
- Liris claviformis T. Li, Cai and Q. Li, 2009
- Liris cleopatra de Beaumont, 1961
- Liris clypeatus (F. Smith, 1873)
- Liris clypefoveolatus T. Li, Cai and Q. Li, 2009
- Liris clypeopunctatus Tsuneki, 1974
- Liris commixtus (R. Turner, 1908)
- Liris conjungens (Walker, 1871)
- Liris consobrinus Arnold, 1959
- Liris conspicuus (F. Smith, 1856)
- Liris corniger F. Williams, 1936
- Liris coronalis (F. Smith, 1856)
- Liris cowani (W.F. Kirby, 1883)
- Liris crassicornis (Maidl, 1925)
- Liris crepitans Leclercq, 1967
- Liris croesus (F. Smith, 1856)
- Liris crux Tsuneki, 1982
- Liris cubitalis (de Saussure, 1887)
- Liris cupreohirtus Tsuneki, 1976
- Liris danus Tsuneki, 1982
- Liris davaonis Tsuneki, 1983
- Liris dejectus Arnold, 1945
- Liris deliquus Krombein and Shanks Gingras, 1984
- Liris denticulatus (R. Turner, 1920)
- Liris dentipes (R. Turner, 1917)
- Liris deplanatus (Kohl, 1884)
- Liris diabolicus (F. Smith, 1873)
- Liris difficilis Tsuneki, 1983
- Liris distinguendus (Spinola, 1842)
- Liris dives (Lepeletier de Saint Fargeau, 1845)
- Liris dominganus (Strand, 1911)
- Liris dominicanus Evans, 1972
- Liris ducalis (F. Smith, 1860)
- Liris dyscheirus (de Saussure, 1892)
- Liris elegans (Bingham, 1897)
- Liris erythropus (Cameron, 1890)
- Liris erythropyga (Arnold, 1940)
- Liris erythrotomus (Cameron, 1908)
- Liris esakii Yasumatsu, 1941
- Liris evansi Krombein and Shanks Gingras, 1984
- Liris extensus (Walker, 1860)
- Liris facilis (F. Smith, 1873)
- Liris fasciatus (F. Smith, 1873)
- Liris ferrugineimarginalis T. Li, Cai and Q. Li, 2007
- Liris ferrugineipes (Lepeletier de Saint Fargeau, 1845)
- Liris festinans (F. Smith, 1858)
- Liris flavinervus (Cameron, 1900)
- Liris flavipennis (F. Williams, 1928)
- Liris flavitinctus (Arnold, 1940)
- Liris formosus Amarante, 2002
- Liris foveiscutis (Cameron, 1913)
- Liris fuliginosus (Dahlbom, 1843)
- Liris fulvipes Fabricius, 1804
- Liris fulviventris (Guérin-Méneville, 1844)
- Liris funereus (F. Smith, 1863)
- Liris fuscatus Tsuneki, 1971
- Liris fuscinervus (Cameron, 1905)
- Liris fuscistigma (Cameron, 1903)
- Liris ganahlii (Dalla Torre, 1897)
- Liris gibbosus Kohl, 1892
- Liris gowdeyi (R. Turner, 1913)
- Liris gracilicornis (Arnold, 1923)
- Liris gryllicida Evans, 1972
- Liris haemorrhoidalis (Fabricius, 1804)
- Liris hanedai Tsuneki, 1971
- Liris huonensis Tsuneki, 1983
- Liris inca Amarante, 2002
- Liris incertus Arnold, 1945
- Liris indicus (Cameron, 1903)
- Liris infrunitus Krombein and Shanks Gingras, 1984
- Liris inopinatus de Beaumont, 1961
- Liris insularis (de Saussure, 1867)
- Liris intermedius (Cameron, 1903)
- Liris iridipennis (Maidl, 1925)
- Liris iriomotensis Tsuneki, 1972
- Liris irroratus (F. Smith, 1856)
- Liris ituriensis Benoit, 1951
- Liris jaculator (F. Smith, 1856)
- Liris jucundus Arnold, 1959
- Liris kalilianus Tsuneki, 1982
- Liris karnyi (Maidl, 1927)
- Liris keiseri (Leclercq, 1961)
- Liris khasianus (Cameron, 1905)
- Liris krombeini Menke in R. Bohart and Menke, 1976
- Liris kuchingensis (Cameron, 1909)
- Liris labiatus (Fabricius, 1793)
- Liris laboriosus (F. Smith, 1856)
- Liris larriformis (F. Williams, 1928)
- Liris larroides (F. Williams, 1928)
- Liris laterisetosus (Spinola, 1851)
- Liris lemkamin Tsuneki, 1982
- Liris ligulatus (F. Williams, 1928)
- Liris limpidipennis (F. Smith, 1873)
- Liris liparus Krombein and Shanks Gingras, 1984
- Liris liriformis (F. Williams, 1947)
- Liris litoralis Tsuneki, 1963
- Liris longicornis (Cameron, 1900)
- Liris longitarsis (Cameron, 1900)
- Liris luctuosus (F. Smith, 1856)
- Liris luteipennis (Cresson, 1869)
- Liris lutusator (F. Williams, 1928)
- Liris magnificus Kohl, 1884
- Liris maidli (Arnold, 1929)
- Liris makiling Tsuneki, 1983
- Liris mandibularis Menke in R. Bohart and Menke, 1976
- Liris manusanus Tsuneki, 1982
- Liris melanius R. Turner, 1916
- Liris melanopterus Tsuneki, 1982
- Liris memnonius (F. Smith, 1856)
- Liris menkei Tsuneki, 1976
- Liris mescalero (Pate, 1943)
- Liris mexicanus Krombein and Shanks Gingras, 1984
- Liris mindanaoensis F. Williams, 1928
- Liris minimus (Arnold, 1923)
- Liris miscophoides (Arnold, 1923)
- Liris modestus (F. Smith, 1859)
- Liris molestus Krombein and Shanks Gingras, 1984
- Liris montivagus (Cameron, 1908)
- Liris mordax Kohl, 1892
- Liris morio Kohl, 1892
- Liris morobensis Tsuneki, 1983
- Liris morrae (Strand, 1910)
- Liris muspa (Pate, 1943)
- Liris mussauanus Tsuneki, 1982
- Liris naguilianus Tsuneki, 1983
- Liris nearcticus Krombein and Shanks Gingras, 1984
- Liris neavei (R. Turner, 1917)
- Liris negrosensis (F. Williams, 1928)
- Liris nielseni Tsuneki, 1976
- Liris niger (Fabricius, 1775)
- Liris nigricans (Walker, 1871)
- Liris nigripes (de Saussure, 1867)
- Liris nigrispinus Krombein and Shanks Gingras, 1984
- Liris nitens (Arnold, 1929)
- Liris novaguineanus Tsuneki, 1983
- Liris nugax (Kohl, 1894)
- Liris obliquetruncatus (R. Turner, 1908)
- Liris obtusedentatus (Maidl, 1925)
- Liris odontophorus (Kohl, 1894)
- Liris opalipennis (Kohl, 1898)
- Liris ordinarius (Arnold, 1932)
- Liris ornatitarsis (Cameron, 1911)
- Liris pacificatrix (R. Turner, 1908)
- Liris palawanus Tsuneki, 1976
- Liris panamensis (Cameron, 1889)
- Liris papuanus Tsuneki, 1983
- Liris papuensis Tsuneki, 1983
- Liris partitus Krombein & Shanks Gingras, 1984
- Liris parvulus (Schrottky, 1903)
- Liris parvus (Cameron, 1903)
- Liris peruanus (Brèthes, 1924)
- Liris peterseni Tsuneki, 1976
- Liris picipes (Cameron, 1903)
- Liris pictipennis (Maidl, 1924)
- Liris piliventris (Cameron, 1903)
- Liris pilosa (Cameron, 1903)
- Liris pitamawa (Rohwer, 1919)
- Liris plebejus (Taschenberg, 1870)
- Liris pluto (F. Smith, 1856)
- Liris politicus (Dalla Torre, 1897)
- Liris primanius (Kohl, 1894)
- Liris pruinosus (F. Smith, 1873)
- Liris pulcherrimus (Cameron, 1902)
- Liris punctatus Tsuneki, 1974
- Liris pygidialis Tsuneki, 1982
- Liris pygmaeus (Cameron, 1903)
- Liris quadrifasciatus (F. Smith, 1856)
- Liris radialis (de Saussure, 1887)
- Liris radulinus Evans, 1972
- Liris reconditus (R. Turner, 1916)
- Liris regina (R. Turner, 1908)
- Liris retirugosus T. Li, Cai and Q. Li, 2009
- Liris robustoides (F. Williams, 1928)
- Liris robustus (F. Williams, 1928)
- Liris rohweri (F. Williams, 1928)
- Liris rubellus (F. Smith, 1856)
- Liris rubricatus (F. Smith, 1856)
- Liris rubripes Tsuneki, 1982
- Liris rufipennis Fabricius, 1804
- Liris rufitarsis (Cameron, 1900)
- Liris rufoscapus (Cameron, 1905)
- Liris rufula Simon Thomas, 1995
- Liris rugifer (R. Turner, 1918)
- Liris sabrinus (Leclercq, 1961)
- Liris sabulosus (F. Smith, 1863)
- Liris sagax Kohl, 1892
- Liris samoa Menke in R. Bohart and Menke, 1976
- Liris samoensis F. Williams, 1928
- Liris scabriusculus Arnold, 1945
- Liris semiappendiculatus (Cameron, 1912)
- Liris semicarinatus Tsuneki, 1976
- Liris senegalensis Simon Thomas, 1995
- Liris sepulchralis (Gerstaecker in Peters, 1858)
- Liris serenus (R. Turner, 1908)
- Liris sericosoma (R. Turner, 1913)
- Liris seychellensis (Cameron, 1907)
- Liris silvicola (F. Williams, 1928)
- Liris simbang Tsuneki, 1983
- Liris similis Krombein and Shanks Gingras, 1984
- Liris simulatrix (Arnold, 1923)
- Liris smithi Tsuneki, 1976
- Liris solomonis Tsuneki, 1982
- Liris solstitialis (F. Smith, 1856)
- Liris sophiae Evans, 1972
- Liris spathulifer (R. Turner, 1916)
- Liris splendens (Ashmead, 1900)
- Liris strenuus (Cameron, 1905)
- Liris striaticollis (Cameron, 1903)
- Liris subfasciatus (Walker, 1871)
- Liris subpetiolatus (F. Smith, 1856)
- Liris subtessellatus (F. Smith, 1856)
- Liris sulcifrons (Cameron, 1905)
- Liris sumatrensis (Maidl, 1927)
- Liris surusumi Tsuneki, 1966
- Liris tachytoides Tsuneki, 1963
- Liris tanoi Tsuneki, 1974
- Liris tegularis (Cameron, 1902)
- Liris tenebrosus (F. Smith, 1873)
- Liris testaceicornis (Cameron, 1905)
- Liris thaianus Tsuneki, 1963
- Liris thysanomerus (Kohl, 1894)
- Liris tibicundus Tsuneki, 1982
- Liris tinctipennis (Cameron, 1889)
- Liris tisiphone (F. Smith, 1858)
- Liris townesi (Krombein, 1949)
- Liris transversus Cheesman, 1955
- Liris trifasciatus (F. Smith, 1856)
- Liris tristis (F. Smith, 1856)
- Liris trivittatus (W.F. Kirby, 1900)
- Liris tropicalis Arnold, 1960
- Liris turneri Tsuneki, 1976
- Liris ubatama Tsuneki, 1982
- Liris uelensis Benoit, 1951
- Liris umbripennis (Cameron, 1902)
- Liris utopicus (Leclercq, 1961)
- Liris vagans (Arnold, 1940)
- Liris varipilosus (Cameron, 1903)
- Liris vechti Sudheendrakumar and Narendran, 1985
- Liris vigilans (F. Smith, 1856)
- Liris vincenti Krombein and Shanks Gingras, 1984
- Liris violaceipennis Cameron, 1904
- Liris vivax (Cameron, 1905)
- Liris voeltzkowii (Kohl, 1909)
- Liris vollenhovius (Ritsema, 1874)
- Liris wheeleri Arnold, 1960
- Liris xanthopterus Arnold, 1945
- Liris xavieri Tsuneki, 1976
- Liris yanonis Tsuneki, 1983
