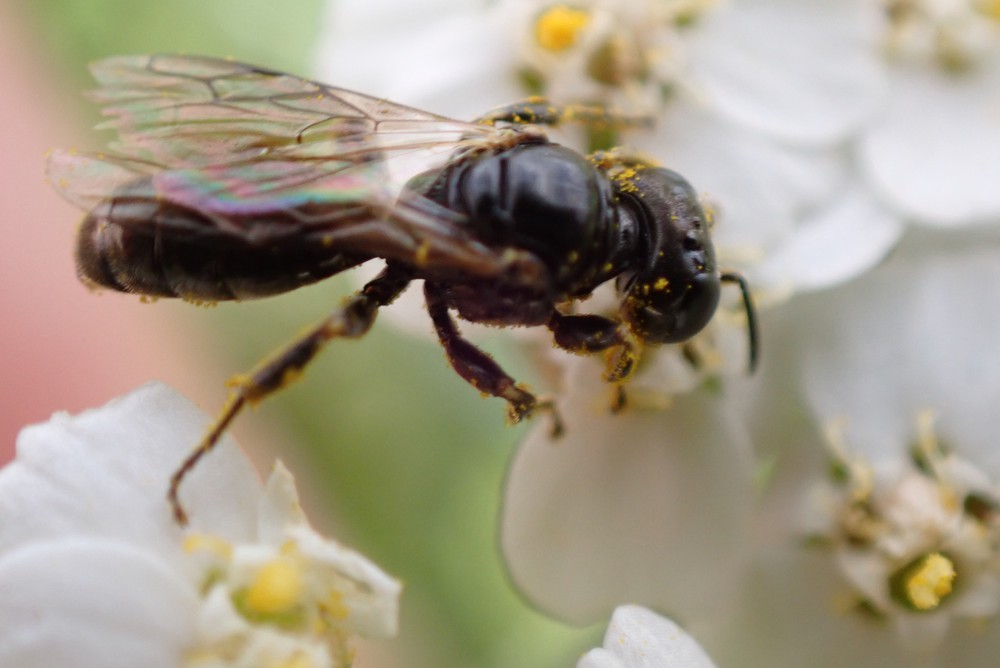

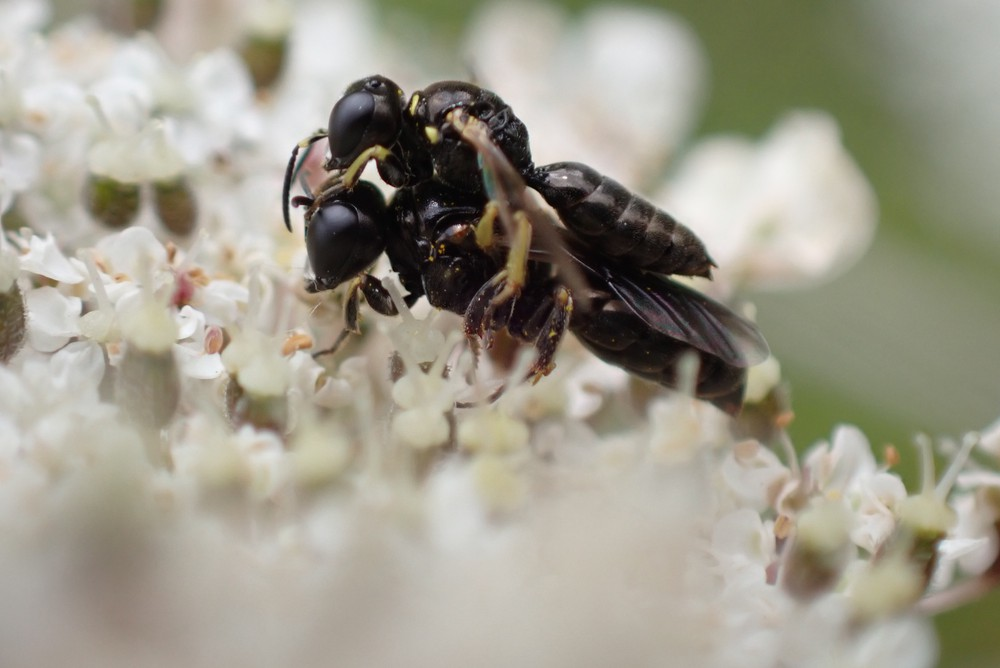
- In copula

Scientific classification
- Domain: Eukaryota
- Kingdom: Animalia
- Phylum: Arthropoda
- Class: Insecta
- Order: Hymenoptera
- Family: Crabronidae
- Tribe: Crabronini
- Subtribe: Crabronina
- Genus: Lindenius
- Species: L. albilabris

Binomial name
- Lindenius albilabris (Fabricius 1793)

= Lindenius albilabris =

Species of wasp

Lindenius albilabris is a Palearctic species of solitary wasp from the Crabronidae.
