= Dinetus =

Dinetus may refer to:

- Dinetus (wasp), a wasp genus in the family Crabronidae
- Dinetus (plant), a plant genus in the family Convolvulaceae
