= Oxybelus cressonii =

Scientific classification
- Domain: Eukaryota
- Kingdom: Animalia
- Phylum: Arthropoda
- Class: Insecta
- Order: Hymenoptera
- Family: Crabronidae
- Tribe: Oxybelini
- Genus: Oxybelus
- Species: O. cressonii

Binomial name
- Oxybelus cressonii C. Robertson, 1889

Species of wasp

Oxybelus cressonii is a species of square-headed wasp in the family Crabronidae. It is found in North America.
