= Leclercqia =

Leclercqia is the scientific name of two genera of organisms and may refer to:

- Leclercqia (plant), a prehistoric genus of lycophytes
- Leclercqia (wasp), a genus of wasps in the family Crabronidae
