= Warrior wasp =

Warrior wasp may refer to:

- Synoeca, a genus of wasps found in South and Central America
- Megalara garuda, a species of wasp found in Indonesia
