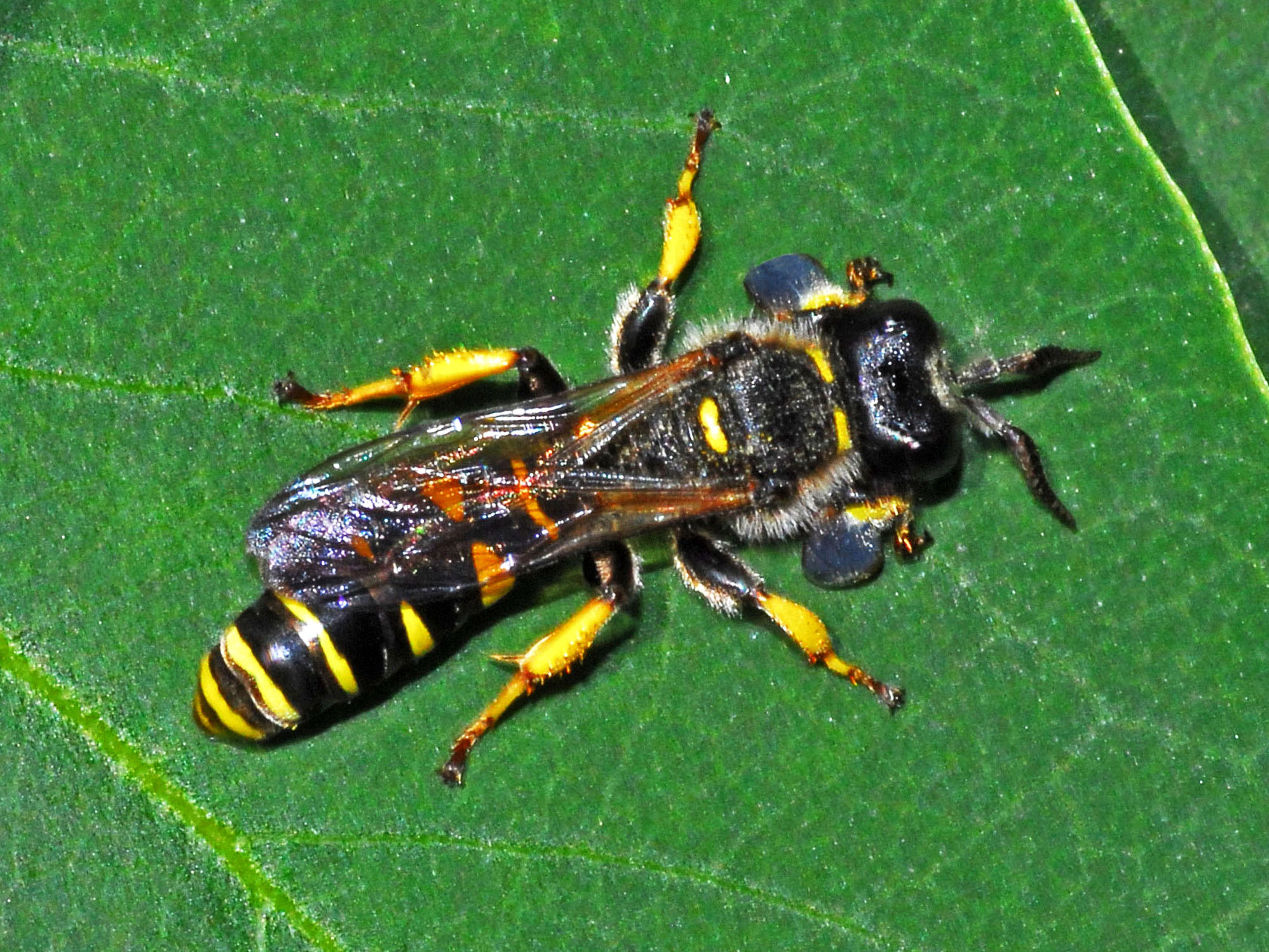
- Crabro cribrarius. Male showing the bluish dilations of fore-tibiae
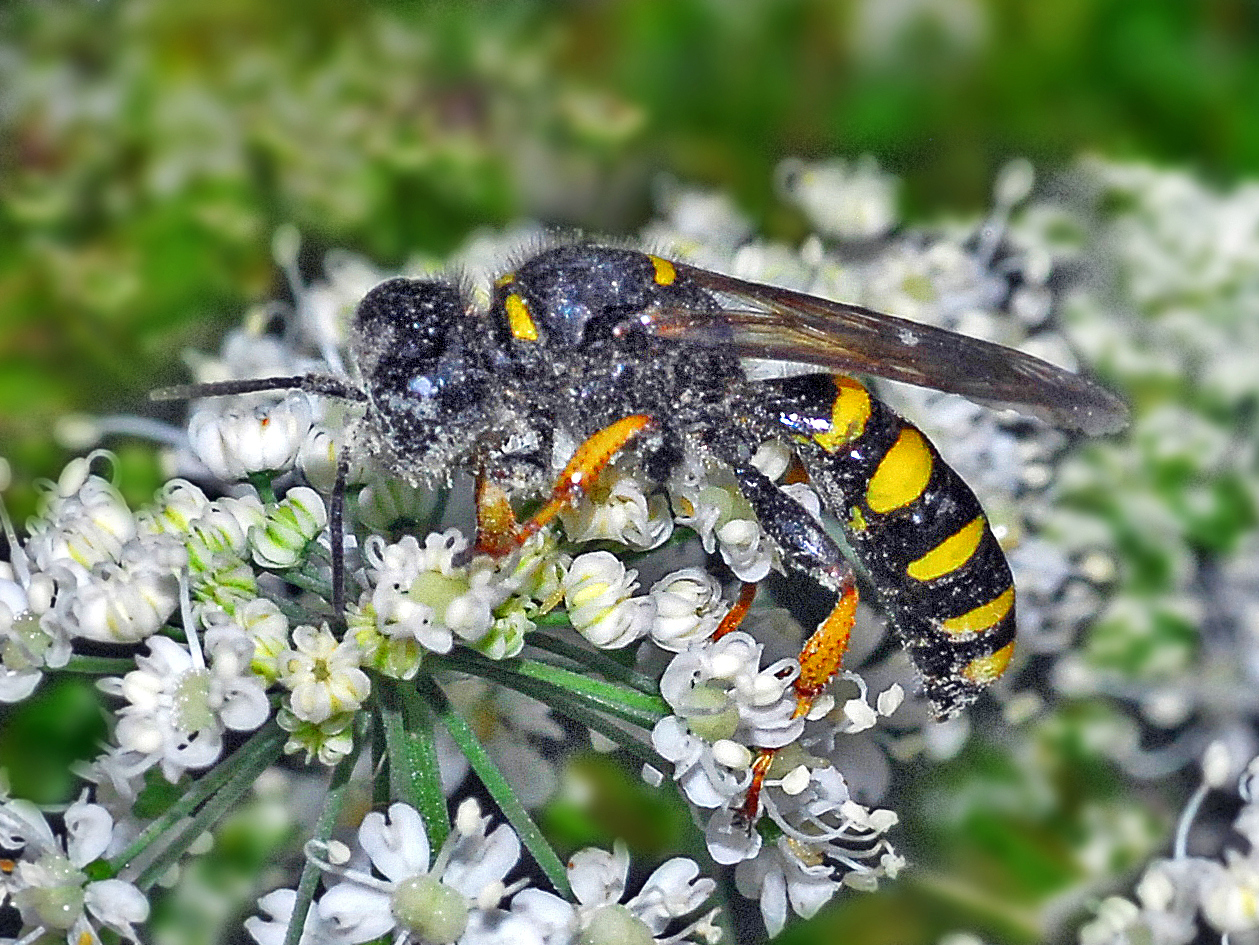
- Crabro cribrarius, female

Scientific classification
- Kingdom: Animalia
- Phylum: Arthropoda
- Class: Insecta
- Order: Hymenoptera
- Family: Crabronidae
- Subfamily: Crabroninae
- Tribe: Crabronini
- Genus: Crabro
- Species: C. cribrarius

Binomial name
- Crabro cribrarius (Linnaeus, 1758)

Synonyms
- Sphex patellarius (Schreber, 1784); Sphex argus (Christ, 1791); Sphex longa (Christ, 1791); Sphex lunatus (Christ, 1791); Crabro palmatus Panzer 1797; Crabro inornatus Mocsary 1901; Crabro hypotheticus Kokujev, 1927

= Crabro cribrarius =

Species of wasp

Crabro cribrarius, common name slender bodied digger wasp, is a species of wasp of the family Crabronidae.

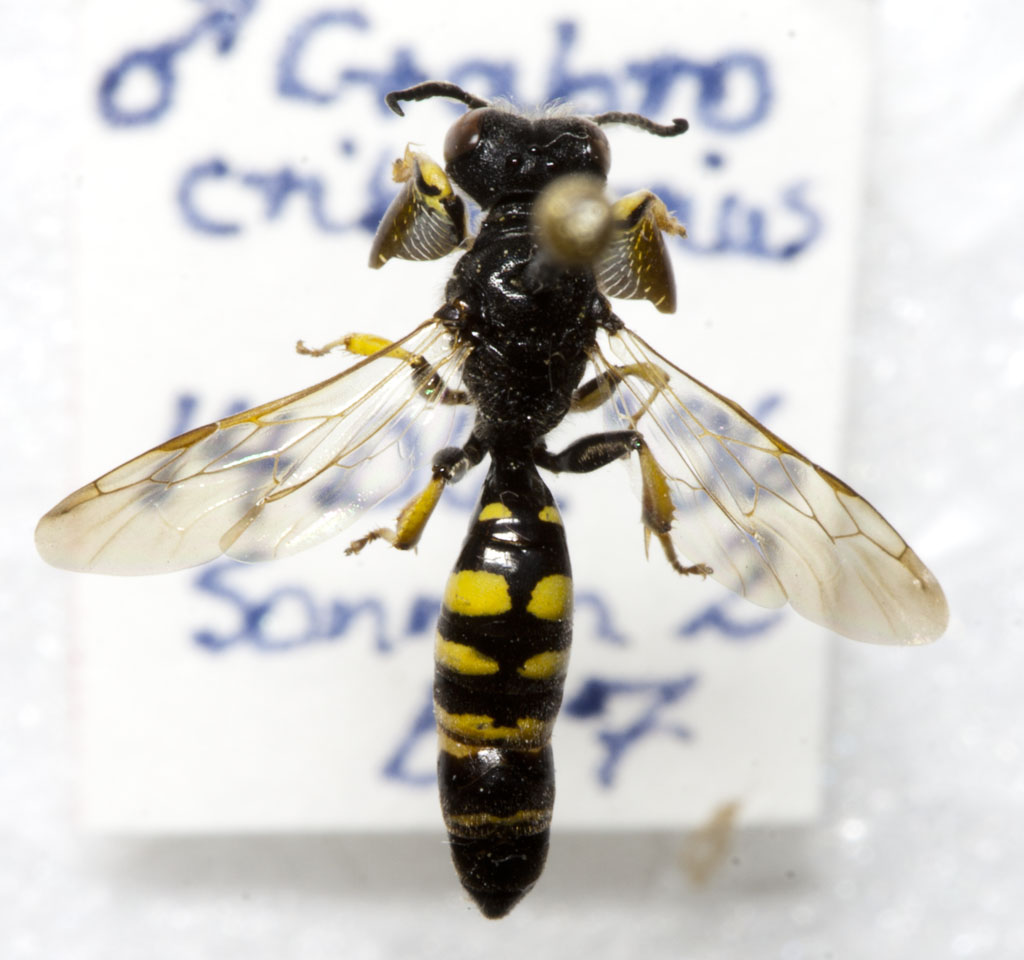
Male of Crabro cribrarius. Mounted specimen

== Description ==
Crabro cribrarius can reach a body length of 11–18 millimetres (0.43–0.71 in) (females) or 9–17 millimetres (0.35–0.67 in) (males). These wasps have a black and yellow body. Males are characterized by conspicuous trowel-like dilatations or fore-tibial shield-like structures used in burrow excavation. The antennae are filiform, with expanded central articles. Tibiae are yellowish-brown and lightly mottled.

== Biology ==
The adults of these solitary wasps feed on nectar of various of umbellifers (Apiaceae), mainly on Angelica sylvestris, Pastinaca sativa, Heracleum and Daucus carota. They also visit Cirsium arvense. These wasps apparently are single-brooded and fly from early June to early September. They build their nests 15 to 20 centimeters deep in sandy or loamy soil, sometimes in rotten wood. At the end of the burrow they construct one-three cells. Each cell is supplied with five to eight medium preys. Females provisions her larvae with paralysed Pyralis and Diptera of various families (Anthomyiidae, Therevidae, Asilidae, Calliphoridae, Empididae, Syrphidae, Tabanidae).

== Distribution ==
This species is present in most of Europe and east across the Palearctic to Korea.

== Habitat ==
These digger wasps colonize dry sandy areas, lowland heaths and coastal dunes, but the can also be found in urban areas, in spruce forest edges, chalk grassland and open woodlands.

== Bibliography ==
- Rolf Witt: Wespen. Beobachten, Bestimmen. Naturbuch-Verlag, Augsburg 1998, ISBN 3-89440-243-1.
