= Liris argentatus =

Scientific classification
- Domain: Eukaryota
- Kingdom: Animalia
- Phylum: Arthropoda
- Class: Insecta
- Order: Hymenoptera
- Family: Crabronidae
- Genus: Liris
- Species: L. argentatus

Binomial name
- Liris argentatus (Palisot de Beauvois, 1811)

Synonyms
- Larra argentata Palisot de Beauvois, 1811; Larra murina (Dahlbom, 1843); Larra nuda (Taschenberg, 1870); Larra pensylvanica Palisot de Beauvois, 1811; Larrada nuda Taschenberg, 1870; Larrada pensylvanica (Palisot de Beauvois, 1811); Notogonia murina (Dahlbom, 1843); Tachytes murinus Dahlbom, 1843

Species of wasp

Liris argentatus is a species of square-headed wasp in the family Crabronidae. It is found in the Caribbean, Central America, North America, and Oceania. Females overwinter as adults.
