= Crabro villosus =

Scientific classification
- Domain: Eukaryota
- Kingdom: Animalia
- Phylum: Arthropoda
- Class: Insecta
- Order: Hymenoptera
- Family: Crabronidae
- Genus: Crabro
- Species: C. villosus

Binomial name
- Crabro villosus W Fox, 1895

Species of wasp

Crabro villosus is a species in the order Hymenoptera ("ants, bees, wasps and sawflies"), in the class Insecta ("insects"). It is found in North America.
