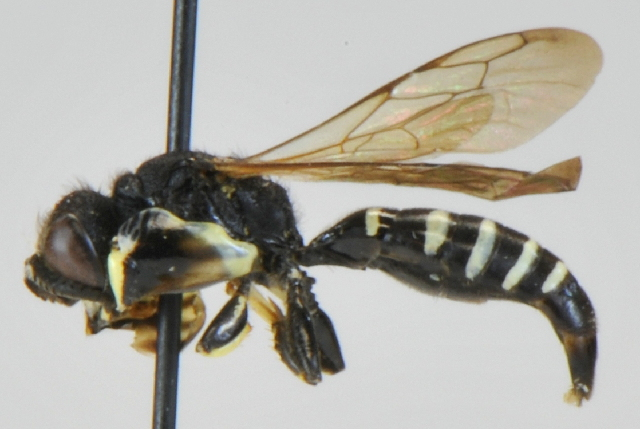

Scientific classification
- Domain: Eukaryota
- Kingdom: Animalia
- Phylum: Arthropoda
- Class: Insecta
- Order: Hymenoptera
- Family: Crabronidae
- Genus: Crabro
- Species: C. latipes

Binomial name
- Crabro latipes F. Smith, 1856

Synonyms
- Crabro elongatus Provancher, 1888; Crabro pratus Carter, 1925; Crabro vicinus Cresson, 1865; Thyreopus coloradensis Packard, 1867; Thyreopus vicinus (Cresson, 1865)

= Crabro latipes =

Species of wasp

Crabro latipes is a species of square-headed wasp in the family Crabronidae. It is found in Central America and North America.
