= Crabro cingulatus =

Scientific classification
- Domain: Eukaryota
- Kingdom: Animalia
- Phylum: Arthropoda
- Class: Insecta
- Order: Hymenoptera
- Family: Crabronidae
- Tribe: Crabronini
- Genus: Crabro
- Species: C. cingulatus

Binomial name
- Crabro cingulatus (Packard, 1867)

Synonyms
- Crabro clarconis Packard, 1867; Thyreopus cingulatus Viereck, 1906

Species of wasp

Crabro cingulatus is a species of square-headed wasp in the family Crabronidae. It is found in Central America and North America.
