= Oxybelus emarginatus =

Scientific classification
- Domain: Eukaryota
- Kingdom: Animalia
- Phylum: Arthropoda
- Class: Insecta
- Order: Hymenoptera
- Family: Crabronidae
- Genus: Oxybelus
- Species: O. emarginatus

Binomial name
- Oxybelus emarginatus Say, 1837

Synonyms
- Notoglossa americana C. Robertson, 1901; Notoglossa dilutus (C. Baker, 1896); Notoglossa minor Mickel, 1916; Notoglossa pacifica Rohwer, 1909; Notoglossa trifidus (Cockerell and C. Baker, 1896); Oxybelus americanus (C. Robertson, 1901); Oxybelus dilutus C. Baker, 1896; Oxybelus minor (Mickel, 1916); Oxybelus pacificus (Rohwer, 1909); Oxybelus trifidus Cockerell and C. Baker, 1896

Species of wasp

Oxybelus emarginatus is a species of square-headed wasp in the family Crabronidae. It is found in North America.
