= Larropsis distincta =

Scientific classification
- Domain: Eukaryota
- Kingdom: Animalia
- Phylum: Arthropoda
- Class: Insecta
- Order: Hymenoptera
- Family: Crabronidae
- Subtribe: Gastrosericina
- Genus: Larropsis
- Species: L. distincta

Binomial name
- Larropsis distincta (F. Smith, 1856)

Synonyms
- Larrada distincta F. Smith, 1856; Larropsis distincta semirufa Banks, 1921

Species of wasp

Larropsis distincta is a species of square-headed wasp in the family Crabronidae. It is found in North America.
