= Liris partitus =

Scientific classification
- Domain: Eukaryota
- Kingdom: Animalia
- Phylum: Arthropoda
- Class: Insecta
- Order: Hymenoptera
- Family: Crabronidae
- Genus: Liris
- Species: L. partitus

Binomial name
- Liris partitus Krombein & Shanks Gingras, 1984

Species of wasp

Liris partitus is a species of square-headed wasp in the family Crabronidae. It is found in Central America and North America.
