= Crabro tumidus =

Scientific classification
- Domain: Eukaryota
- Kingdom: Animalia
- Phylum: Arthropoda
- Class: Insecta
- Order: Hymenoptera
- Family: Crabronidae
- Genus: Crabro
- Species: C. tumidus

Binomial name
- Crabro tumidus (Packard, 1867)

Synonyms
- Thyreopus tumidus Packard, 1867

Species of wasp

Crabro tumidus is a species of square-headed wasp in the family Crabronidae. It is found in North America.
