= Lestica confluenta =

Scientific classification
- Domain: Eukaryota
- Kingdom: Animalia
- Phylum: Arthropoda
- Class: Insecta
- Order: Hymenoptera
- Family: Crabronidae
- Genus: Lestica
- Species: L. confluenta

Binomial name
- Lestica confluenta (Say, 1837)

Synonyms
- Crabro atrifrons Cresson, 1865; Crabro bellus Cresson, 1865; Crabro cinctibellus Viereck, 1908; Crabro confluentus Say, 1837; Crabro dubius F. Smith, 1856; Crabro eburneus Taschenberg, 1875; Crabro opwana Rohwer, 1908; Crabro planaris Mickel, 1916; Crabro townsendi Rohwer, 1911; Lestica cinctibella (Viereck, 1908); Lestica eburnea (Taschenberg, 1875); Lestica interrupta bellus (Cresson, 1865); Lestica planaris (Mickel, 1916); Solenius bellus (Cresson, 1865); Solenius planaris (Mickel, 1916); Solenius seamansi W. Carter, 1925

Species of wasp

Lestica confluenta is a species of square-headed wasp in the family Crabronidae. It is found in North America.
