= Anacrabro ocellatus =

Scientific classification
- Kingdom: Animalia
- Phylum: Arthropoda
- Clade: Pancrustacea
- Class: Insecta
- Order: Hymenoptera
- Family: Crabronidae
- Genus: Anacrabro
- Species: A. ocellatus

Binomial name
- Anacrabro ocellatus Packard, 1866

Synonyms
- Anacrabro ocellatus robertsoni Rohwer, 1920; Anacrabro robertsoni Rohwer, 1920; Crabro rugosopunctatus (Provancher, 1883); Thyreopus rugosopunctatus Provancher, 1883

Species of wasp

Anacrabro ocellatus is a species of square-headed wasp in the family Crabronidae. It is found in Central America and North America.

== Subspecies ==
These three subspecies belong to the species Anacrabro ocellatus:

- Anacrabro ocellatus boerhaviae Cockerell, 1895
- Anacrabro ocellatus micheneri Leclercq, 1973
- Anacrabro ocellatus ocellatus Packard, 1866
