= Crabro argusinus =

Scientific classification
- Domain: Eukaryota
- Kingdom: Animalia
- Phylum: Arthropoda
- Class: Insecta
- Order: Hymenoptera
- Family: Crabronidae
- Tribe: Crabronini
- Genus: Crabro
- Species: C. argusinus

Binomial name
- Crabro argusinus R. Bohart in R. Bohart & Menke, 1976

Species of wasp

Crabro argusinus is a species of square-headed wasp in the family Crabronidae. It is found in North America.
