= Dalara =

Scientific classification
- Kingdom: Animalia
- Phylum: Arthropoda
- Clade: Pancrustacea
- Class: Insecta
- Order: Hymenoptera
- Family: Crabronidae
- Subfamily: Crabroninae
- Tribe: Larrini
- Subtribe: Larrina
- Genus: Dalara; Ritsema, 1884

Synonyms
- Darala Ritsema, 1884; Hyoliris F. Williams, 1919

Genus of wasps

Dalara is a genus of wasp in the family Crabronidae, tribe Larrini.

== Species ==
The genus Dalara contains 2 extant species:

- Dalara mandibularis F. Williams, 1919
- Dalara schlegelii (Ritsema, 1884)

== See also ==
- Dalara garuda
