= Lestica producticollis =

Scientific classification
- Domain: Eukaryota
- Kingdom: Animalia
- Phylum: Arthropoda
- Class: Insecta
- Order: Hymenoptera
- Family: Crabronidae
- Genus: Lestica
- Species: L. producticollis

Binomial name
- Lestica producticollis (Packard, 1866)

Synonyms
- Crabro producticollis Packard, 1866; Crabro quadrimaculatus Provancher, 1882

Species of wasp

Lestica producticollis is a species of square-headed wasp in the family Crabronidae. It is found in North America.
