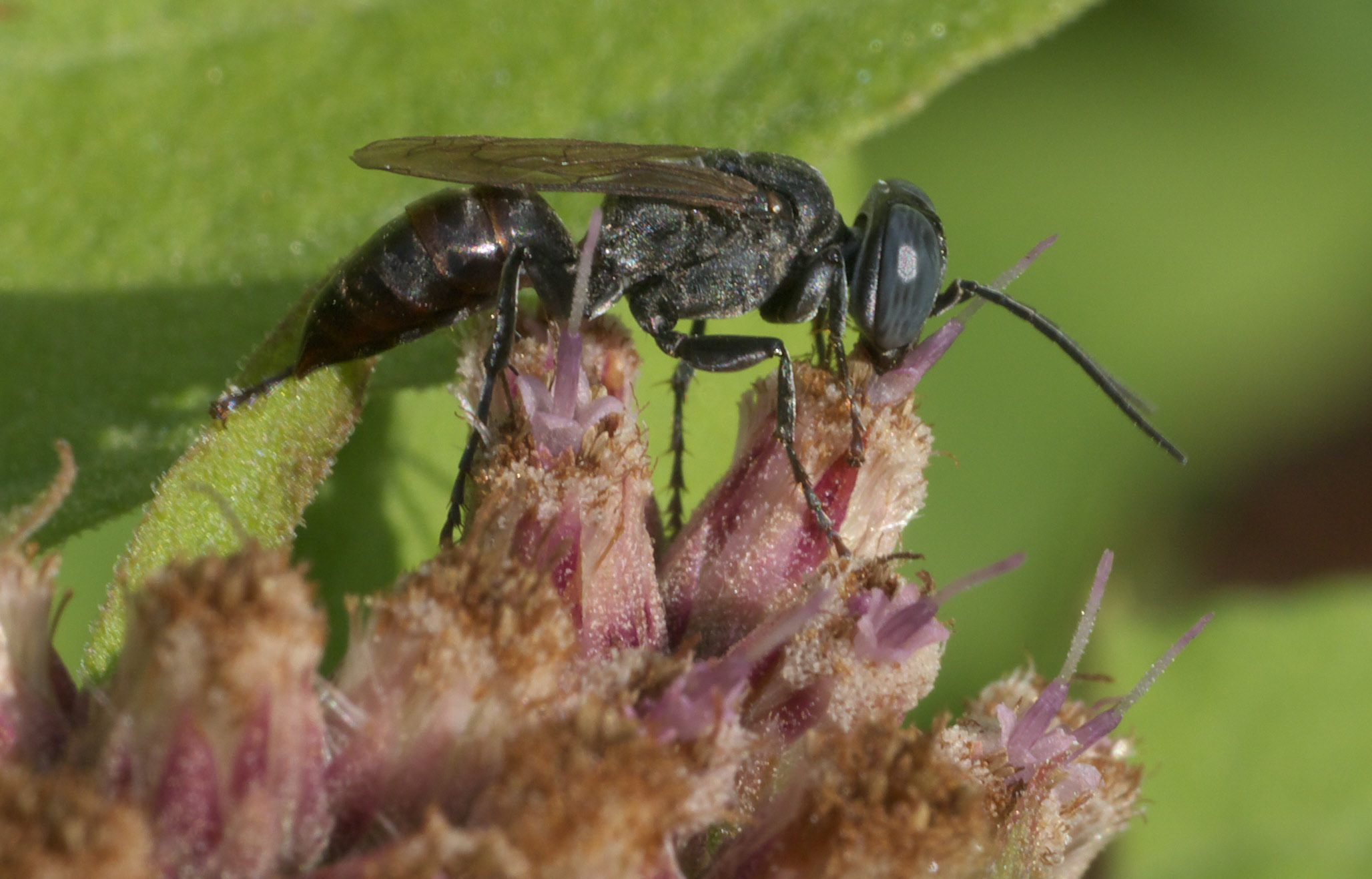
- Gastrosericina

Scientific classification
- Kingdom: Animalia
- Phylum: Arthropoda
- Class: Insecta
- Order: Hymenoptera
- Family: Crabronidae
- Subfamily: Crabroninae
- Tribe: Larrini; Latreille, 1810

= Larrini =

Tribe of wasps

Larrini is a tribe of square-headed wasps in the family Crabronidae. About 15 genera and more than 1,300 described species are placed in the Larrini.

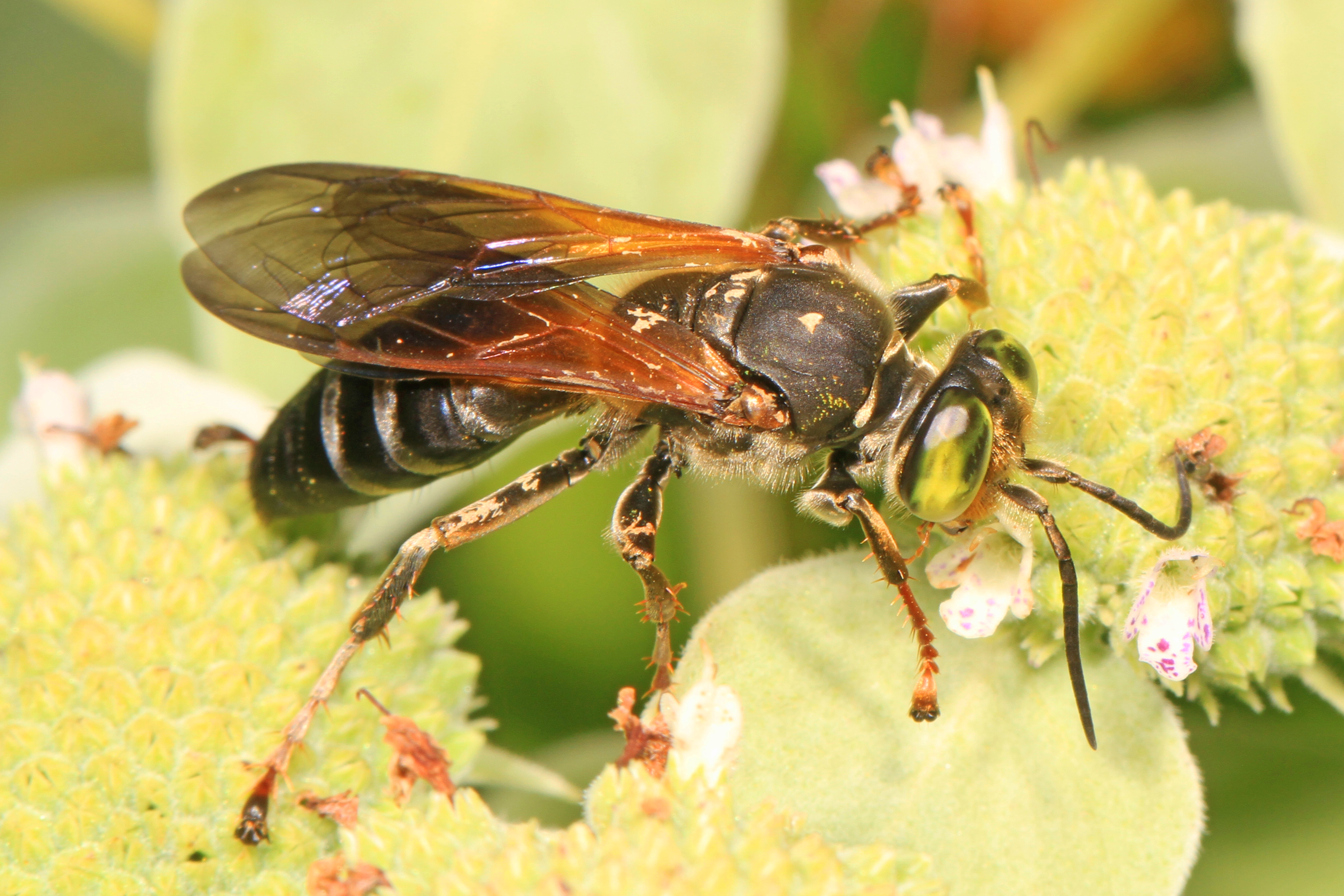
Tachytes guatemalensis

== Genera ==
These 15 genera belong to the tribe Larrini:

- Dalara Ritsema, 1884
- Dicranorhina Shuckard, 1840
- Gastrosericus Spinola, 1839
- Holotachysphex de Beaumont, 1940
- Kohliella Brauns, 1910
- Larra Fabricius, 1793 (mole cricket hunters)
- Larropsis Patton, 1892
- Liris Fabricius, 1804
- Megalara Kimsey and Ohl, 2012
- Paraliris Kohl, 1884
- Parapiagetia Kohl, 1897
- Prosopigastra A. Costa, 1867
- Tachysphex Kohl, 1883
- Tachytella Brauns, 1906
- Tachytes Panzer, 1806
