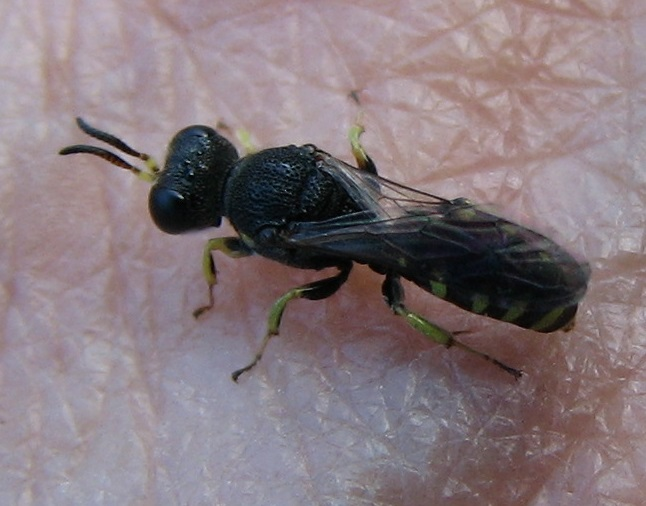
- Lestica male

Scientific classification
- Kingdom: Animalia
- Phylum: Arthropoda
- Class: Insecta
- Order: Hymenoptera
- Family: Crabronidae
- Subfamily: Crabroninae
- Tribe: Crabronini
- Subtribe: Crabronina; Latreille, 1802

= Crabronina =

Subtribe of wasps

Crabronina is a subtribe of square-headed wasps in the family Crabronidae. There are at least 1,300 described species in Crabronina.

== Genera ==
- Alinia Antropov, 1993
- Arnoldita Pate, 1948
- Chimila Pate, 1944
- Chimiloides Leclercq, 1951
- Crabro Fabricius, 1775
- Crorhopalum Tsuneki, 1984
- Crossocerus Lepeletier de Saint Fargeau & Brullé, 1835
- Dasyproctus Lepeletier de Saint Fargeau and Brullé, 1835
- Echucoides Leclercq, 1957
- Ectemnius Dahlbom, 1845
- Enoplolindenius Rohwer, 1911
- Eupliloides Pate, 1946
- Foxita Pate, 1942
- Hingstoniola Turner and Waterston, 1926
- Holcorhopalum Cameron, 1904
- Huacrabro Leclercq, 2000
- Huavea Pate, 1948
- Isorhopalum Leclercq, 1963
- Krombeinictus Leclercq, 1996
- Leclercqia Tsuneki, 1968
- Lecrenierus Leclercq, 1977
- Lestica Billberg, 1820
- Lindenius Lepeletier de Saint Fargeau and Brullé, 1835
- Minicrabro Leclercq, 2003
- Moniaecera Ashmead, 1899
- Neodasyproctus Arnold, 1926
- Notocrabro Leclercq, 1951
- Odontocrabro Tsuneki, 1971
- Pae Pate, 1944
- Papurus Tsuneki, 1983
- Parataruma Kimsey, 1982
- Pericrabro Leclercq, 1954
- Piyuma Pate, 1944
- Piyumoides Leclercq, 1963
- Podagritoides Leclercq, 1957
- Podagritus Spinola, 1851
- Pseudoturneria Leclercq, 1954
- Quexua Pate, 1942
- Rhopalum Stephens, 1829
- Tracheliodes A. Morawitz, 1866
- Tsunekiola Antropov, 1986
- Vechtia Pate, 1944
- Williamsita Pate, 1947
- Zutrhopalum Leclercq, 1998
