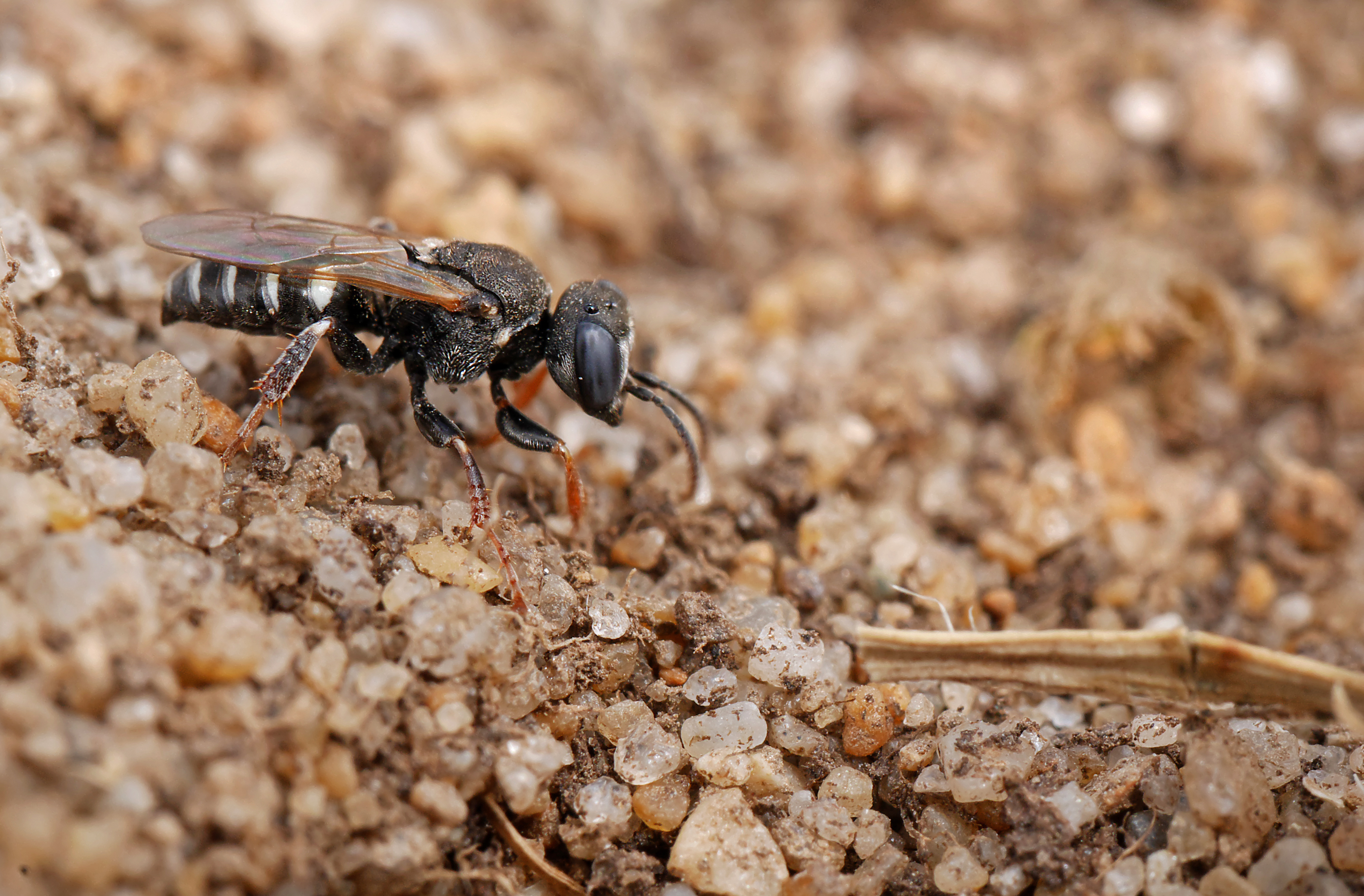
- Oxybelus uniglumis

Scientific classification
- Kingdom: Animalia
- Phylum: Arthropoda
- Class: Insecta
- Order: Hymenoptera
- Family: Crabronidae
- Genus: Oxybelus
- Species: O. uniglumis

Binomial name
- Oxybelus uniglumis (Linnaeus, 1758)

Synonyms
- Crabro tridens Linnaeus, 1758; Nomada punctata Fabricius, 1793; Oxybelus brodiei Fabricius, 1798; Oxybelus fallax (Fabricius, 1798); Oxybelus hispanicus Olivier, 1812; Oxybelus impatiens Say, 1824; Oxybelus interruptus F. Smith, 1856; Oxybelus pygmaeus Cresson, 1865; Oxybelus quadrinotatus Gerstaecker, 1867; Oxybelus quadrinotatus montanus Provancher, 1883; Oxybelus tridens Giner Marí, 1943; Oxybelus uniglumis quadrinotatus Say, 1824; Vespa uniglumis C. Robertson, 1889

= Oxybelus uniglumis =

Species of wasp

Oxybelus uniglumis is a species of square-headed wasp in the family Crabronidae. It is found in Europe, Northern Asia (excluding China), and Southern Asia.
