= Palarini =

Scientific classification
- Domain: Eukaryota
- Kingdom: Animalia
- Phylum: Arthropoda
- Class: Insecta
- Order: Hymenoptera
- Family: Crabronidae
- Subfamily: Crabroninae
- Tribe: Palarini; Schrottky, 1909

Tribe of wasps

Palarini is a tribe of square-headed wasps in the family Crabronidae. There are at least 2 genera and more than 30 described species in Palarini.

== Genera ==
These two genera belong to the tribe Palarini:

- Mesopalarus Brauns, 1899
- Palarus Latreille, 1802
