= Belomicrus =

Scientific classification
- Domain: Eukaryota
- Kingdom: Animalia
- Phylum: Arthropoda
- Class: Insecta
- Order: Hymenoptera
- Family: Crabronidae
- Tribe: Oxybelini
- Genus: Belomicrus; Costa, 1871

Genus of insects

Belomicrus is a genus of insects belonging to the family Crabronidae.

The species of this genus are found in Europe, Africa and Northern America.

Species:

- Belomicrus affinis Gussakovskij, 1952
- Belomicrus albosectus Kazenas & Antropov, 1994
