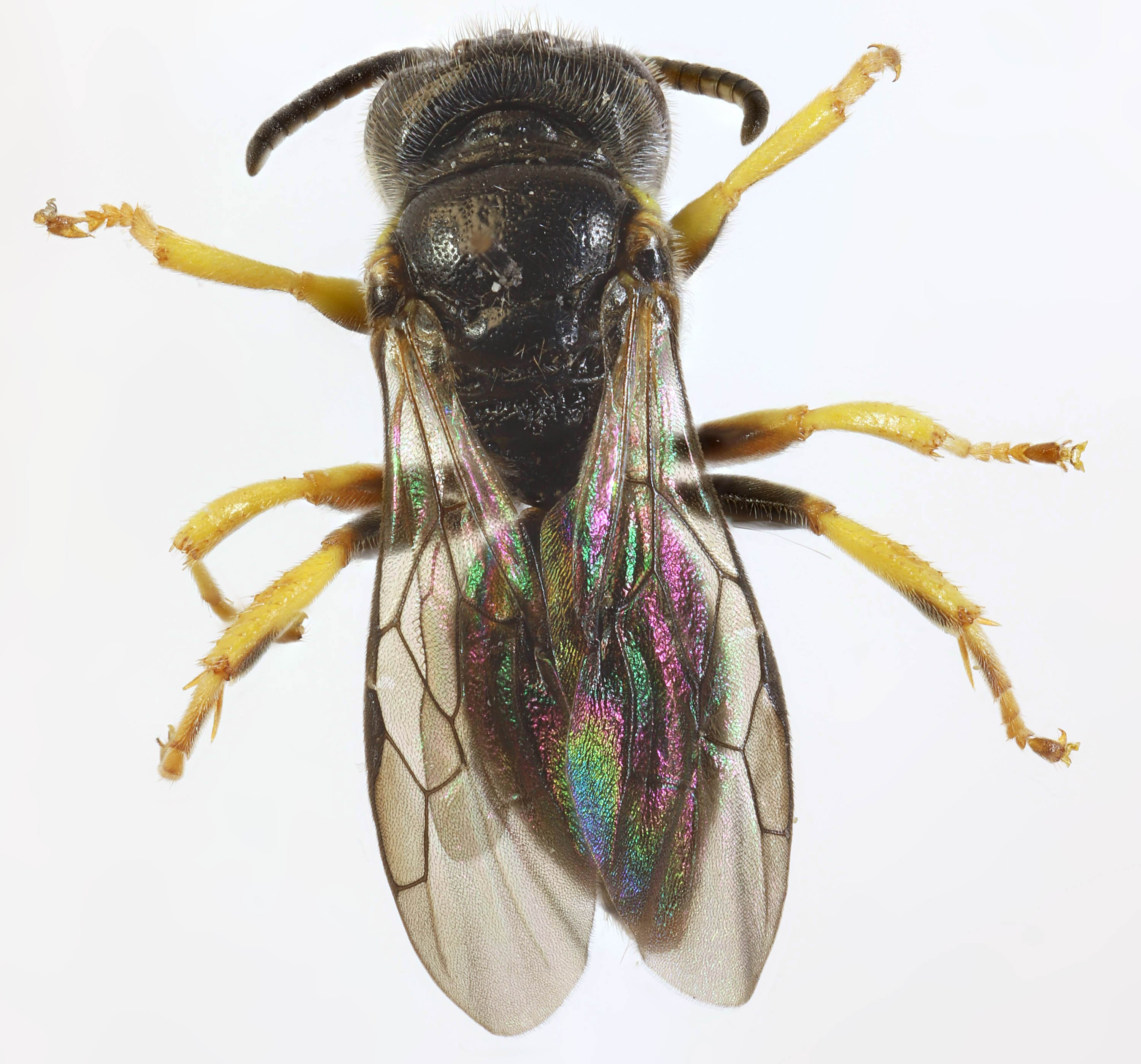

Scientific classification
- Domain: Eukaryota
- Kingdom: Animalia
- Phylum: Arthropoda
- Class: Insecta
- Order: Hymenoptera
- Family: Crabronidae
- Subtribe: Anacrabronina
- Genus: Entomognathus; Dahlbom, 1844

= Entomognathus =

Genus of wasps

Entomognathus is a genus of wasps belonging to the family Crabronidae.

The species of this genus are found in Europe, Southern Africa, Southern Asia and North America.

Species:

- Entomognathus alaris Bohart, 1995
