= Anacrabro =

Scientific classification
- Kingdom: Animalia
- Phylum: Arthropoda
- Class: Insecta
- Order: Hymenoptera
- Family: Crabronidae
- Tribe: Crabronini
- Subtribe: Anacrabronina
- Genus: Anacrabro; Packard, 1866

Genus of wasps

Anacrabro is a genus of square-headed wasps in the family Crabronidae. There are about 15 described species in Anacrabro.

== Species ==
These 15 species belong to the genus Anacrabro:

- Anacrabro argentinus Brèthes, 1913
- Anacrabro benoistianus Leclercq, 1951
- Anacrabro boerhaviae Cockerell, 1895
- Anacrabro cimiciraptor F. Williams, 1928
- Anacrabro cordobae Leclercq, 1996
- Anacrabro corriens Leclercq, 1996
- Anacrabro coruleter Pate, 1947
- Anacrabro eganus Leclercq, 1954
- Anacrabro fritzi Leclercq, 1973
- Anacrabro golbachi Leclercq, 1973
- Anacrabro guayasensis Leclercq, 2007
- Anacrabro meridionalis Ducke, 1908
- Anacrabro mocanus Leclercq, 1973
- Anacrabro ocellatus Packard, 1866
- Anacrabro salvadorius Leclercq, 1973
