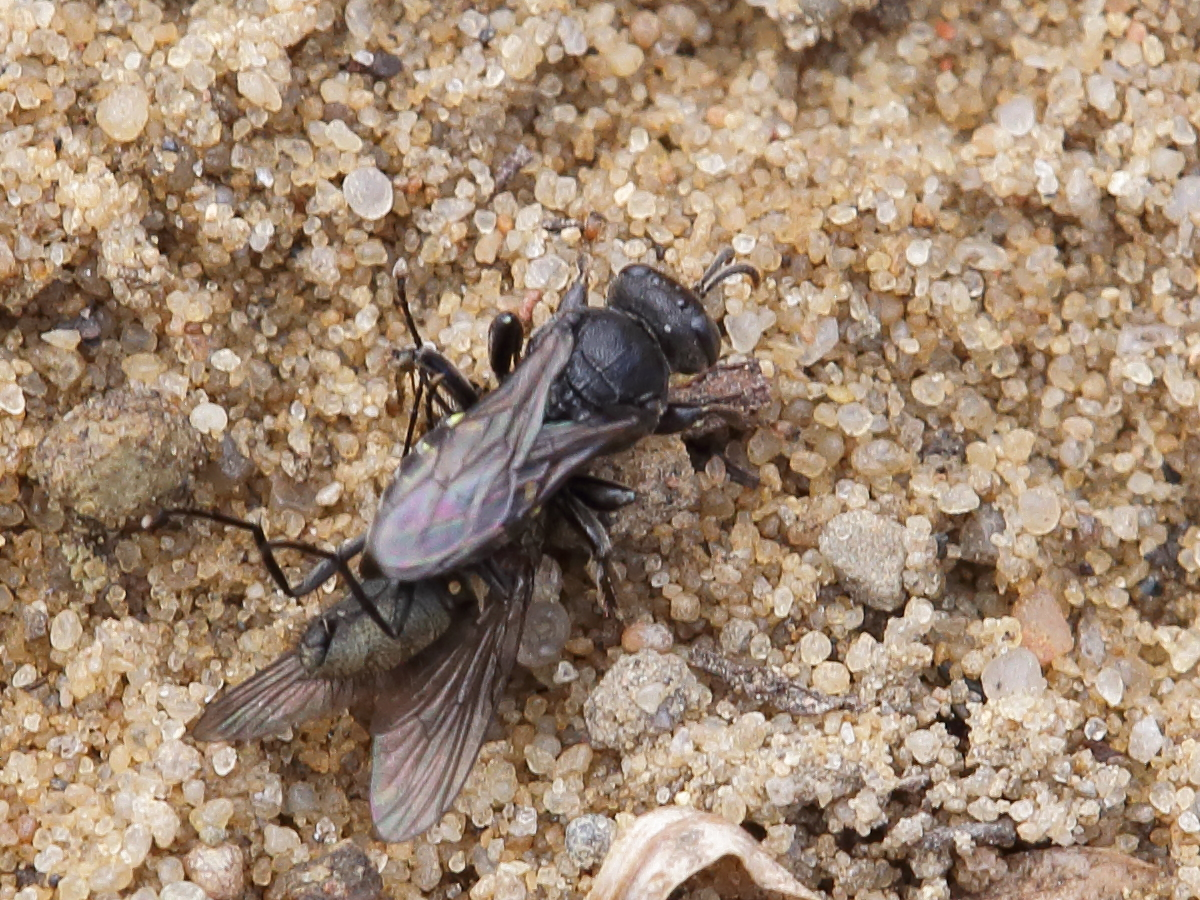
- Oxybelus bipunctatus carrying fly prey to be buried

Scientific classification
- Domain: Eukaryota
- Kingdom: Animalia
- Phylum: Arthropoda
- Class: Insecta
- Order: Hymenoptera
- Family: Crabronidae
- Genus: Oxybelus
- Species: O. bipunctatus

Binomial name
- Oxybelus bipunctatus Olivier, 1812

Synonyms
- Oxybelus laevigatus Schilling, 1848; Oxybelus nigroaeneus Shuckard, 1837

= Oxybelus bipunctatus =

Species of wasp

Oxybelus bipunctatus is a species of square-headed wasp in the family Crabronidae. It is found in Africa, Europe and Northern Asia (excluding China), and North America.

== Subspecies ==
These two subspecies belong to the species Oxybelus bipunctatus:

- Oxybelus bipunctatus bipunctatus Olivier, 1812
- Oxybelus bipunctatus thermophilus de Beaumont, 1950
