= Chimila (wasp) =

Scientific classification
- Domain: Eukaryota
- Kingdom: Animalia
- Phylum: Arthropoda
- Class: Insecta
- Order: Hymenoptera
- Family: Crabronidae
- Subtribe: Crabronina
- Genus: Chimila; Pate, 1944

Genus of wasps

Chimila is a genus of square-headed wasps in the family Crabronidae. There are about six described species in Chimila.

== Species ==
These six species belong to the genus Chimila:

- Chimila cerdai Leclercq, 2005^{i c g}
- Chimila cooperiana Leclercq, 1980^{i c g}
- Chimila hondurana Leclercq, 2005^{i c g}
- Chimila mocoana Leclercq, 1980^{i c g}
- Chimila pae Pate, 1944^{i c g}
- Chimila tinguana Leclercq, 1980^{i c g}

Data sources: i = ITIS, c = Catalogue of Life, g = GBIF, b = Bugguide.net
