= Larropsis =

Scientific classification
- Domain: Eukaryota
- Kingdom: Animalia
- Phylum: Arthropoda
- Class: Insecta
- Order: Hymenoptera
- Family: Crabronidae
- Tribe: Larrini
- Subtribe: Gastrosericina
- Genus: Larropsis; Patton, 1892

Subgenera
- Larropsis (Ancistromma) W. Fox, 1893; Larropsis (Larropsis) Patton, 1892

Synonyms
- Ancistromma W. Fox, 1893

Genus of wasps

Larropsis is a genus of square-headed wasps in the family Crabronidae. There are more than 40 described species in Larropsis.

== Species ==
These 42 species belong to the genus Larropsis:

- Larropsis arizonensis G.Bohart & R.Bohart, 1966
- Larropsis asiatica (Gussakovskij, 1935)
- Larropsis atra F.Williams, 1914
- Larropsis aurantia (W.Fox, 1891)
- Larropsis bradleyi G.Bohart & R.Bohart, 1962
- Larropsis capax (W.Fox, 1894)
- Larropsis chilopsidis (Cockerell, 1897)
- Larropsis conferta (W.Fox, 1894)
- Larropsis consimilis (W. Fox, 1894)
- Larropsis corrugata G.Bohart & R.Bohart, 1962
- Larropsis deserta G.Bohart & R.Bohart, 1966
- Larropsis discreta (W.Fox, 1894)
- Larropsis distincta (F. Smith, 1856)
- Larropsis divisa (Patton, 1879)
- Larropsis elegans G.Bohart & R.Bohart, 1966
- Larropsis europaea (Mercet, 1910)
- Larropsis europaeae (Mercet, 1910)
- Larropsis filicornis Rohwer, 1911
- Larropsis granulosa G.Bohart & R.Bohart, 1962
- Larropsis greenei Rohwer, 1917
- Larropsis hurdi G.Bohart & R.Bohart, 1962
- Larropsis interoculans G.E.Bohart & R.Bohart, 1966
- Larropsis interocularis G.Bohart & R.Bohart, 1966
- Larropsis lucida G.Bohart & R.Bohart, 1966
- Larropsis obliqua (F.Smith, 1856)
- Larropsis platynota G.Bohart & R.Bohart, 1962
- Larropsis portiana (Rohwer, 1911)
- Larropsis punctulata (Kohl, 1884)
- Larropsis rugosa (W.Fox, 1894)
- Larropsis sericea G.Bohart & R.Bohart, 1966
- Larropsis sericifrons (H.Smith, 1906)
- Larropsis shappirioi G.Bohart & R.Bohart, 1962
- Larropsis snowi G.Bohart & R.Bohart, 1966
- Larropsis sonora G.Bohart & R.Bohart, 1966
- Larropsis sparsa G.Bohart & R.Bohart, 1966
- Larropsis striata G.Bohart & R.Bohart, 1966
- Larropsis tenuicornis (F.Smith, 1856)
- Larropsis testacea G.Bohart & R.Bohart, 1966
- Larropsis texensis G.Bohart & R.Bohart, 1966
- Larropsis uniformis G.Bohart & R.Bohart, 1966
- Larropsis vegeta (W.Fox, 1894)
- Larropsis washoensis G.Bohart & R.Bohart, 1966
