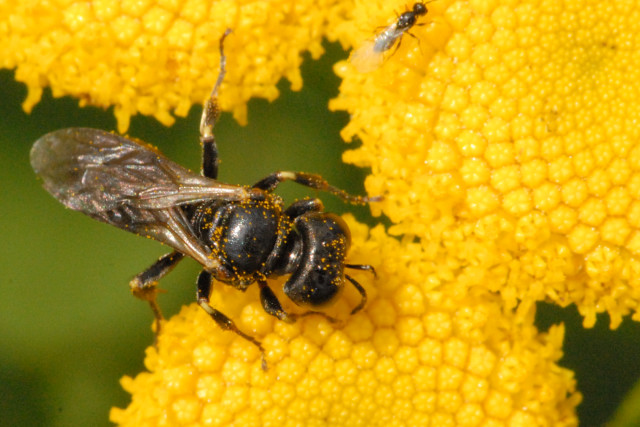
- Lindenius albilabris

Scientific classification
- Domain: Eukaryota
- Kingdom: Animalia
- Phylum: Arthropoda
- Class: Insecta
- Order: Hymenoptera
- Family: Crabronidae
- Subtribe: Crabronina
- Genus: Lindenius; Lepeletier & Brulle, 1835

Type species
- Lindenius albilabris (Fabricius, 1793)

= Lindenius =

Genus of insects

Lindenius is a genus of wasps in the family Crabronidae. Most species are found in the Palearctic; a few are Nearctic. 63 species are known
