= Alinia (wasp) =

Scientific classification
- Domain: Eukaryota
- Kingdom: Animalia
- Phylum: Arthropoda
- Class: Insecta
- Order: Hymenoptera
- Family: Crabronidae
- Subtribe: Crabronina
- Genus: Alinia; Antropov, 1993

Genus of wasps

Alinia is a genus of square-headed wasps in the family Crabronidae. There are at least four described species in Alinia.

== Species ==
These four species belong to the genus Alinia:

- Alinia alinae Leclercq, 1993^{i c g}
- Alinia altivaga Leclercq, 1993^{i c g}
- Alinia carinata Antropov, 1993^{i c g}
- Alinia mogina Leclercq, 2005^{i c g}

Data sources: i = ITIS, c = Catalogue of Life, g = GBIF, b = Bugguide.net
