= Pae (wasp) =

Scientific classification
- Domain: Eukaryota
- Kingdom: Animalia
- Phylum: Arthropoda
- Class: Insecta
- Order: Hymenoptera
- Family: Crabronidae
- Subtribe: Crabronina
- Genus: Pae; Pate, 1944

Genus of wasps

Pae is a genus of square-headed wasps in the family Crabronidae. There are about eight described species in Pae.

== Species ==
These eight species belong to the genus Pae:

- Pae amaripa Pate, 1944^{i c g}
- Pae beniae Leclercq, 1995^{i c g}
- Pae macasae Leclercq, 1995^{i c g}
- Pae manausae Leclercq, 2005^{i c g}
- Pae napoensis Leclercq, 1995^{i c g}
- Pae nasicornis (F. Smith, 1873)^{i c g}
- Pae paniquita Pate, 1944^{i c g}
- Pae surinamensis Leclercq, 1995^{i c g}

Data sources: i = ITIS, c = Catalogue of Life, g = GBIF, b = Bugguide.net
