= Tracheliodes =

Scientific classification
- Domain: Eukaryota
- Kingdom: Animalia
- Phylum: Arthropoda
- Class: Insecta
- Order: Hymenoptera
- Family: Crabronidae
- Subfamily: Crabroninae
- Tribe: Crabronini
- Subtribe: Crabronina
- Genus: Tracheliodes; Morawitz, 1866

Genus of wasps

Tracheliodes is a genus of wasps belonging to the family Crabronidae.

The species of this genus are found in Europe, Africa and Northern America.

Species:

- Crabro succinalis (Cockerell, 1909)
- Crabro tornquisti (Cockerell, 1909)
