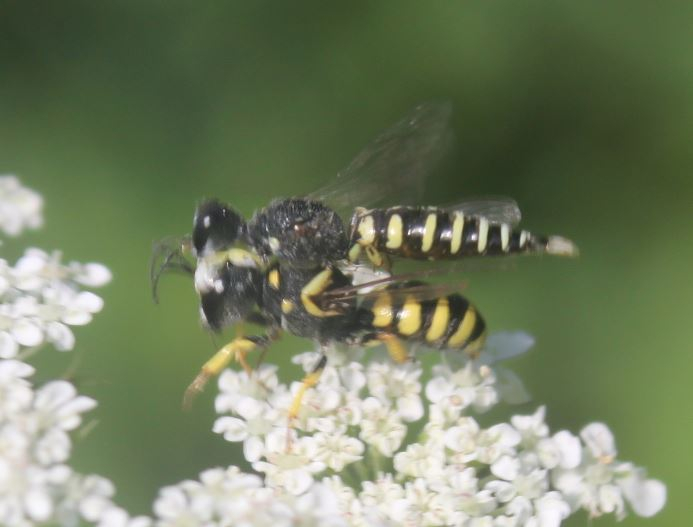
- Lestica clypeata

Scientific classification
- Domain: Eukaryota
- Kingdom: Animalia
- Phylum: Arthropoda
- Class: Insecta
- Order: Hymenoptera
- Family: Crabronidae
- Subtribe: Crabronina
- Genus: Lestica; Billberg, 1820

Synonyms
- Ceratocolus Lepeletier de Saint Fargeau and Brullé, 1835; Clypeocrabro Richards, 1935; Hypothyreus Ashmead, 1899; Ptyx Pate, 1947; Thyreus Lepeletier de Saint Fargeau and Brullé, 1835

= Lestica =

Genus of wasps

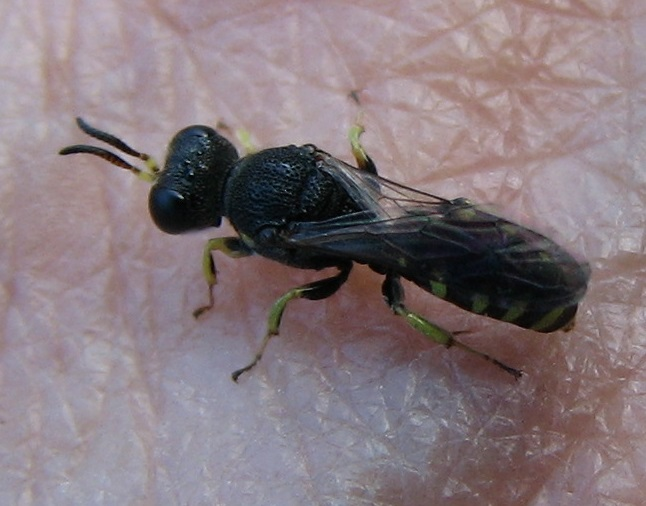
Lestica sp. male

Lestica is a genus of square-headed wasps in the family Crabronidae. There are at least 40 described species in Lestica.

== Species ==
These 46 species belong to the genus Lestica:

- Lestica alaceris (Bingham, 1896)^{g}
- Lestica alacris (Bingham, 1896)^{i c g}
- Lestica alata (Panzer, 1797)^{i c g}
- Lestica aurantiaca (Kohl, 1915)^{i c g}
- Lestica bibundica Leclercq, 1972^{i c g}
- Lestica biroi Tsuneki, 1977^{i c g}
- Lestica camelus (Eversmann, 1849)^{i c g}
- Lestica cinctella (W. Fox, 1895)^{i c g}
- Lestica clypeata (Schreber, 1759)^{i c g}
- Lestica collaris (Matsumura, 1912)^{i c g}
- Lestica combinata Leclercq, 1963^{i c g}
- Lestica compacta (Kohl, 1915)^{i c g}
- Lestica confluenta (Say, 1837)^{i c g b}
- Lestica consolator Leclercq, 1963^{i c g}
- Lestica constricta Krombein, 1949^{i c g}
- Lestica cubensis (Cresson, 1865)^{i c g}
- Lestica dasymera Pate, 1948^{i c g}
- Lestica eurypus (Kohl, 1898)^{c g}
- Lestica eyurypus (Kohl, 1898)^{i}
- Lestica florkini Leclercq, 1956^{i c g}
- Lestica formosana Tsuneki, 1977^{i c g}
- Lestica fulvipes Tsuneki, 1977^{i c g}
- Lestica hentona Tsuneki, 1990^{i c g}
- Lestica heros (Kohl, 1915)^{i c g}
- Lestica indonesica Leclercq, 1958^{i c g}
- Lestica joseana Leclercq, 2006^{i c g}
- Lestica krombeinii Tsuneki, 1983^{i c g}
- Lestica lieftincki Leclercq, 1958^{i c g}
- Lestica luzonia Leclercq, 1963^{i c g}
- Lestica molucca Leclercq, 1956^{i c g}
- Lestica okinawana Tsuneki, 1990^{i c g}
- Lestica plumata Leclercq, 1963^{i c g}
- Lestica pluschtschevskyi (F. Morawitz, 1891)^{i c g}
- Lestica primitiva Leclercq, 1958^{i c g}
- Lestica producticollis (Packard, 1866)^{i c g b}
- Lestica pygidialis (Pérez, 1905)^{i c g}
- Lestica quadriceps (Bingham, 1897)^{i c g}
- Lestica reiteri (Kohl, 1915)^{i c g}
- Lestica relicta Leclercq, 1951^{i c g}
- Lestica rufigaster Tsuneki, 1984^{i c g}
- Lestica sculpturata (F. Smith, 1873)^{i c g}
- Lestica siblina Leclercq, 1972^{i c g}
- Lestica subterranea (Fabricius, 1775)^{i c g}
- Lestica sylvatica (Arnold, 1932)^{i c g}
- Lestica tobleri Tsuneki, 1977^{i c g}
- Lestica wollmanni (Kohl, 1915)^{i c g}

Data sources: i = ITIS, c = Catalogue of Life, g = GBIF, b = Bugguide.net
