= Palarus =

- Palarus pentheri

Scientific classification
- Kingdom: Animalia
- Phylum: Arthropoda
- Clade: Pancrustacea
- Class: Insecta
- Order: Hymenoptera
- Family: Crabronidae
- Subfamily: Crabroninae
- Tribe: Palarini
- Genus: Palarus; Latreille, 1802

Synonyms
- Gonius Panzer, 1806

Genus of insects

Palarus is a genus of crabronid wasps, with 32 species. They typically prey on other wasps and bees which they use to provision their nests.

== Distribution ==
Africa and Eurasia.

== Species ==
- Palarus ambustus Klug, 1845
- Palarus arabicus Pulawski in Pulawski and Prentice, 2008
- Palarus bernardi de Beaumont, 1949
- Palarus bisignatus F. Morawitz, 1890
- Palarus comberi R. Turner, 1911
- Palarus confusus R. Turner, 1911
- Palarus dongalensis Klug, 1845
- Palarus fulviventris Latreille, 1812
- Palarus funerarius F. Morawitz, 1889
- Palarus furtivus Pulawski in Pulawski and Prentice, 2008
- Palarus gao Pulawski and Prentice, 2008
- Palarus gynaecotrichus Pulawski and Prentice, 2008
- Palarus hastatifrons R. Turner, 1919
- Palarus histrio Spinola, 1839
- Palarus inexspectatus Pulawski in Pulawski and S. Gess, 2016
- Palarus interruptus (Fabricius, 1787)
- Palarus jaxartes Pulawski and Prentice, 2008
- Palarus klugi Menke in Bohart and Menke, 1976
- Palarus laetus Klug, 1845
- Palarus latifrons Kohl, 1884
- Palarus maculatus Dahlbom, 1845
- Palarus nama Pulawski and Prentice, 2008
- Palarus obesus Arnold, 1951
- Palarus occidentalis Arnold, 1929
- Palarus oneili Brauns, 1899
- Palarus parvulus de Beaumont, 1949
- Palarus pentheri Brauns, 1899
- Palarus pictiventris F. Morawitz, 1890
- Palarus rufipes Latreille, 1812
- Palarus saundersi Morice, 1897
- Palarus turneri Brauns, 1912
- Palarus variegatus (Fabricius, 1781)
