= Anacrabronina =

Scientific classification
- Domain: Eukaryota
- Kingdom: Animalia
- Phylum: Arthropoda
- Class: Insecta
- Order: Hymenoptera
- Family: Crabronidae
- Tribe: Crabronini
- Subtribe: Anacrabronina; Ashmead, 1899

Subtribe of wasps

Anacrabronina is a subtribe of square-headed wasps in the family Crabronidae. There are at least 4 genera and 120 described species in Anacrabronina.

== Genera ==
These four genera belong to the subtribe Anacrabronina:

- Anacrabro Packard, 1866^{i c g b}
- Encopognathus Kohl, 1897^{i c g}
- Entomocrabro Kohl, 1905^{i c g}
- Entomognathus Dahlbom, 1844^{i c g}

Data sources: i = ITIS, c = Catalogue of Life, g = GBIF, b = Bugguide.net
