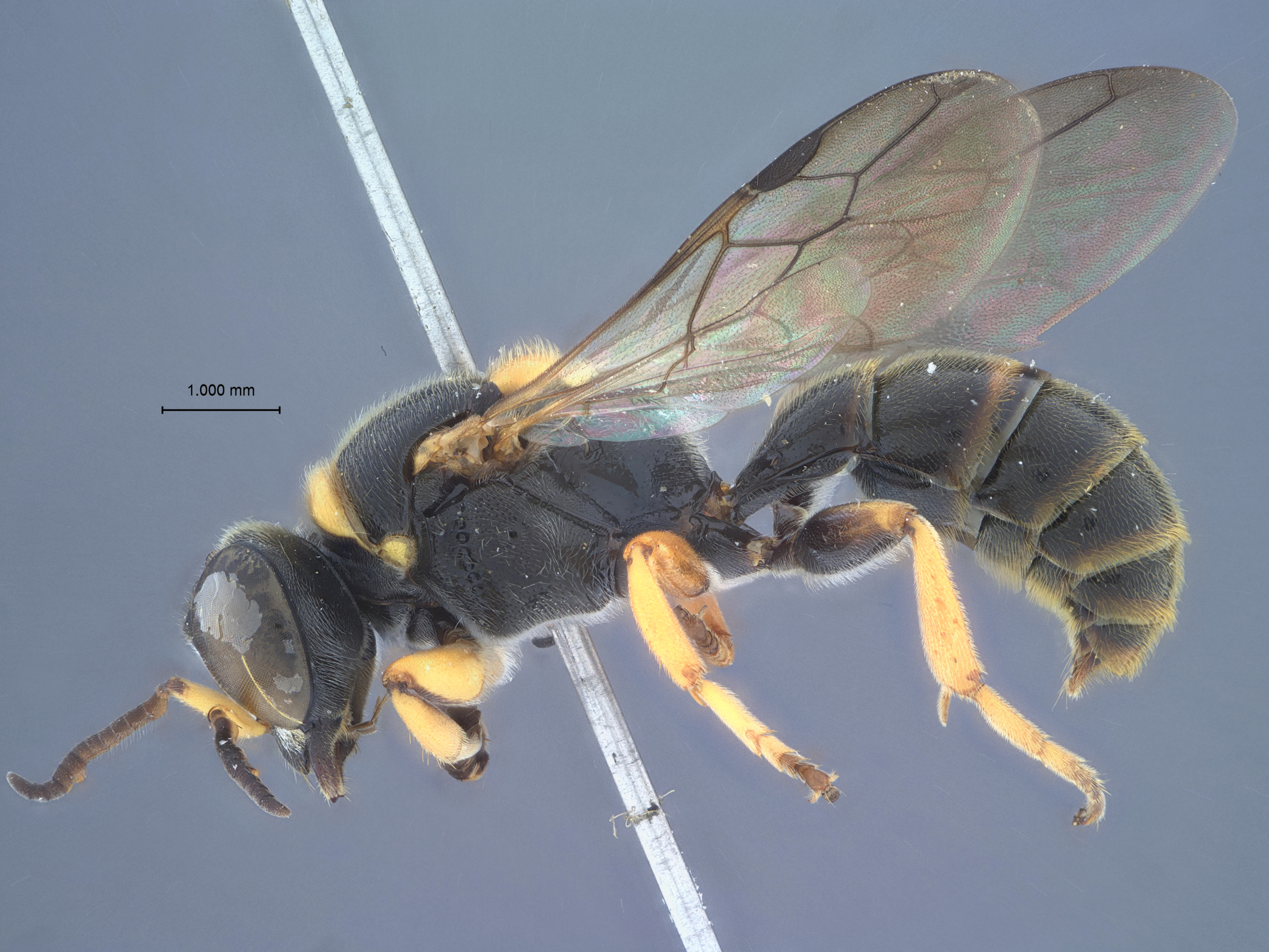

Scientific classification
- Domain: Eukaryota
- Kingdom: Animalia
- Phylum: Arthropoda
- Class: Insecta
- Order: Hymenoptera
- Family: Crabronidae
- Subfamily: Crabroninae
- Tribe: Crabronini
- Subtribe: Crabronina
- Genus: Leclercqia; Tsuneki, 1968
- Species: L. formosana

Binomial name
- Leclercqia formosana Tsuneki, 1968

= Leclercqia formosana =

Species of wasp

Leclercqia is a genus of square-headed wasps in the family Crabronidae, containing only one described species, Leclercqia formosana.
