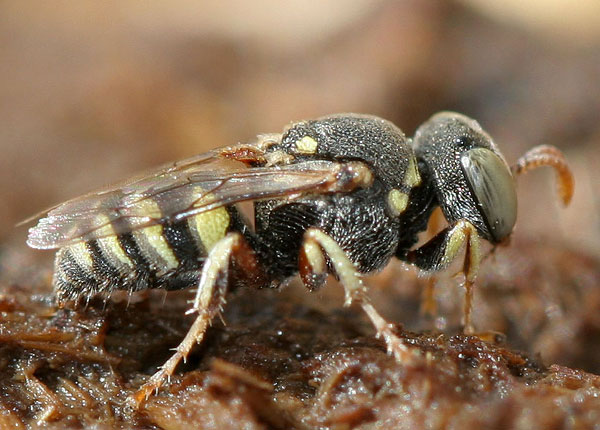
- Oxybelus uniglumis

Scientific classification
- Domain: Eukaryota
- Kingdom: Animalia
- Phylum: Arthropoda
- Class: Insecta
- Order: Hymenoptera
- Family: Crabronidae
- Subfamily: Crabroninae
- Tribe: Oxybelini; Leach, 1815

= Oxybelini =

Tribe of wasps

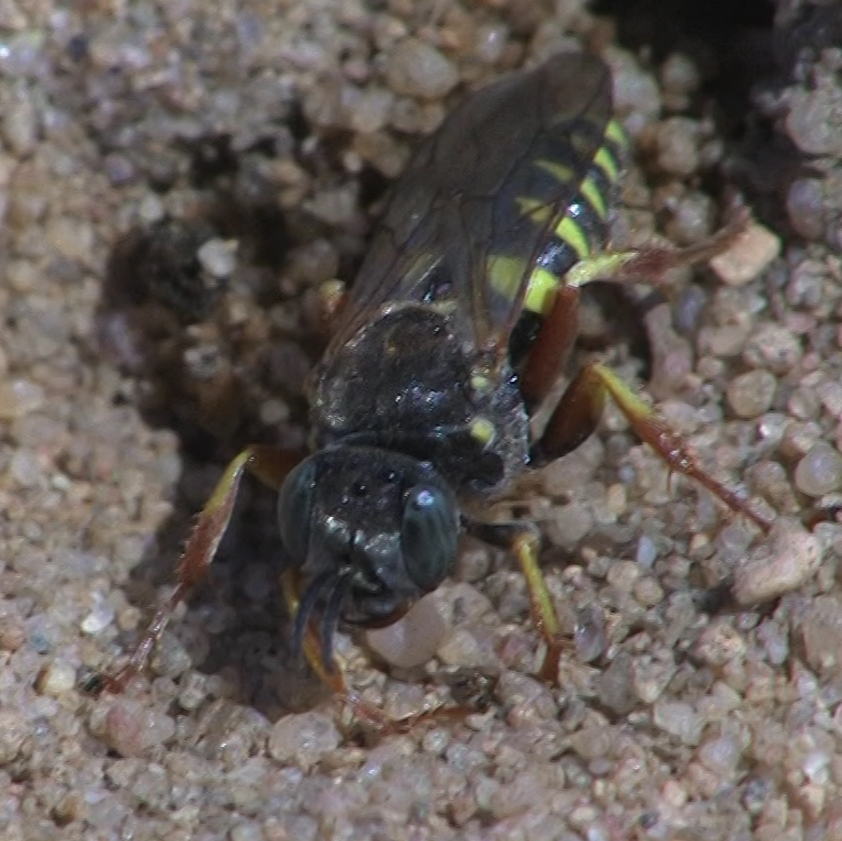
Oxybelus argentatus

Oxybelini is a tribe of square-headed wasps in the family Crabronidae. There are about 15 genera and more than 440 described species in Oxybelini.

== Genera ==
These 15 genera belong to the tribe Oxybelini:

- Belarnoldus Antropov, 2007
- Belokohlus Antropov, 2007
- Belomicrinus Antropov, 2000
- Belomicroides Kohl, 1899
- Belomicrus A. Costa, 1867
- Brimocelus Arnold, 1927
- Enchemicrum Pate, 1929
- Gessus Antropov, 2001
- Guichardus Antropov, 2007
- Minimicroides Antropov, 2000
- Nototis Arnold, 1927
- Oxybelomorpha Brauns, 1897
- Oxybelus Latreille, 1797
- Pseudomicroides Antropov, 2001
- Wojus Antropov, 1999
