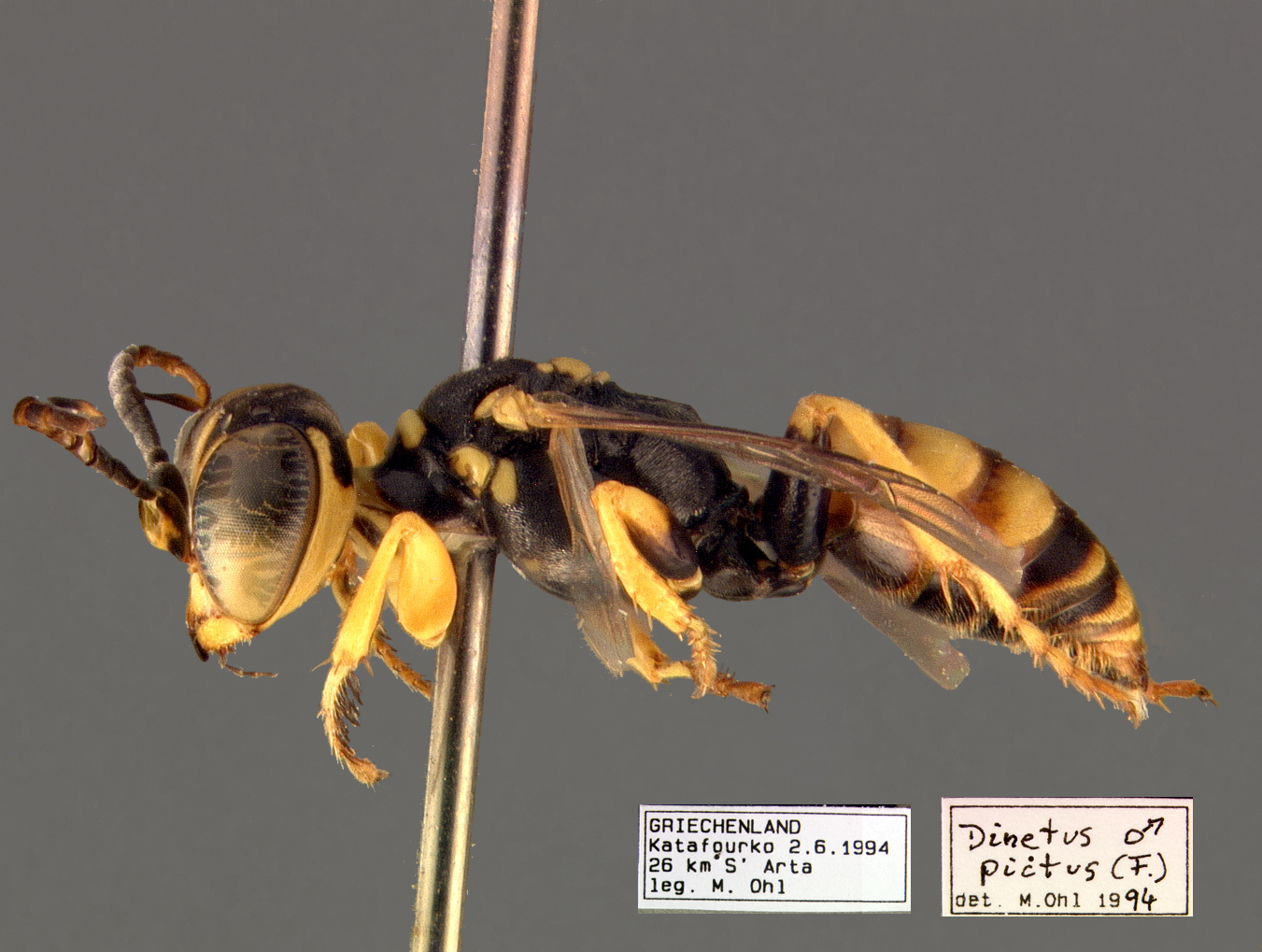
- Dinetus pictus

Scientific classification
- Domain: Eukaryota
- Kingdom: Animalia
- Phylum: Arthropoda
- Class: Insecta
- Order: Hymenoptera
- Family: Crabronidae
- Subfamily: Dinetinae; W. Fox, 1895
- Genus: Dinetus; Panzer, 1806

= Dinetus (wasp) =

Genus of insects

Dinetus is a genus of predatory wasps belonging to the family Crabronidae. It is the only genus in the subfamily Dinetinae.

== Species ==
- Dinetus arabicus H. Jacobs, 2021
- Dinetus arenarius Kazenas, 1973
- Dinetus cereolus Morice, 1897
- Dinetus dentipes E. Saunders, 1910
- Dinetus deserticus H. Jacobs, 2021
- Dinetus hameri Notton, 2020
- Dinetus jordanicus H. Jacobs, 2021
- Dinetus nabataeus de Beaumont, 1960
- Dinetus pictus (Fabricius, 1793)
- Dinetus politus Turner, 1917
- Dinetus porcellaneus Guichard, 1980
- Dinetus psammophilus Kazenas, 1977
- Dinetus pulawskii de Beaumont, 1960
- Dinetus rakhimovi Mokrousov & Khedher, 2020
- Dinetus schmideggeri H. Jacobs, 2021
- Dinetus simplicipes E. Saunders, 1910
- Dinetus tunisiensis Khedher & Mokrousov, 2020
- Dinetus turanicus Kazenas, 1993
- Dinetus vanharteni H. Jacobs, 2021
- Dinetus venustus de Beaumont, 1957
- Dinetus wojciechi Kazenas, 1998
