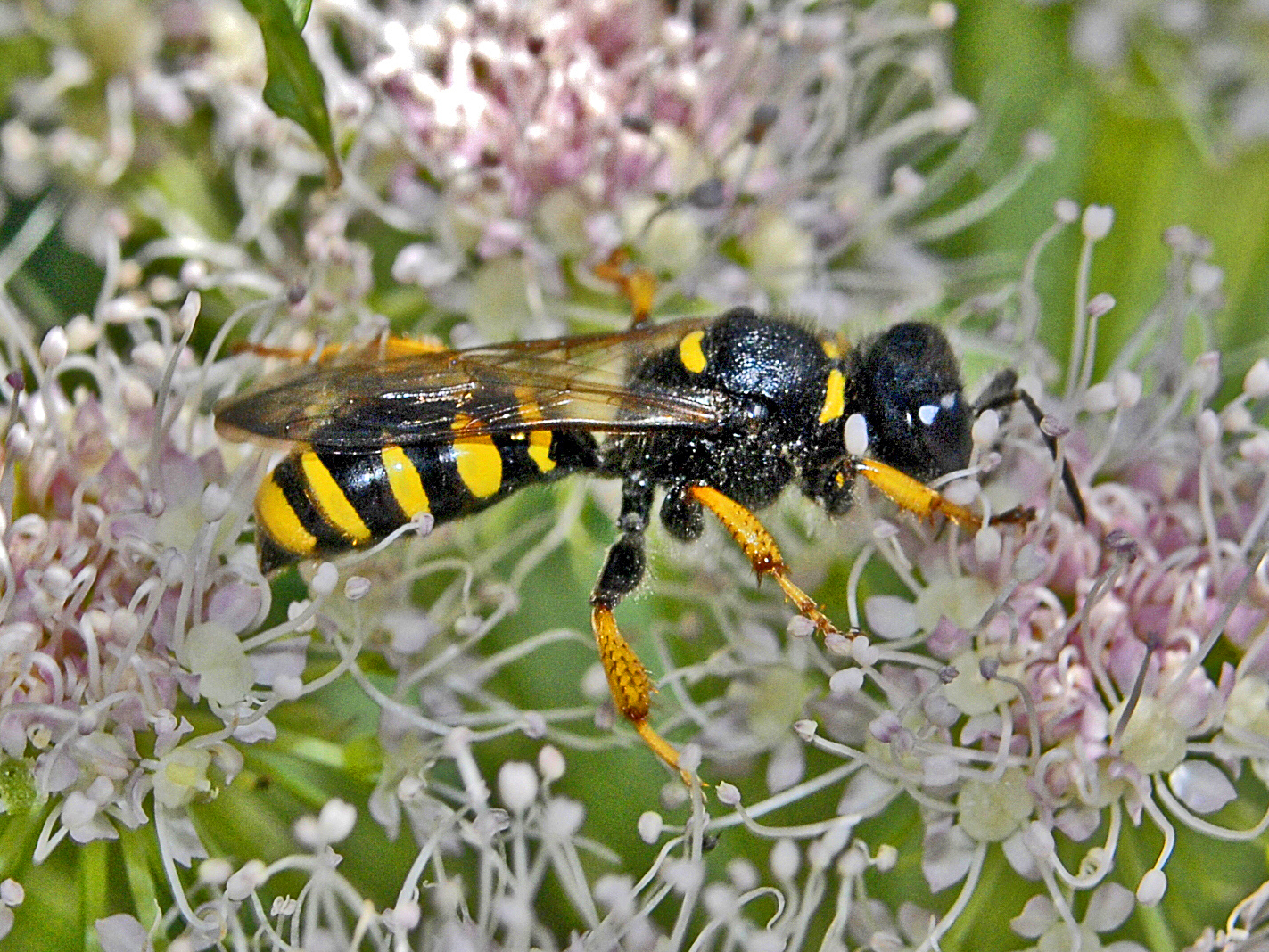
- Crabro cribrarius

Scientific classification
- Domain: Eukaryota
- Kingdom: Animalia
- Phylum: Arthropoda
- Class: Insecta
- Order: Hymenoptera
- Family: Crabronidae
- Tribe: Crabronini
- Genus: Crabro; Fabricius, 1775

Type species
- Crabro cribrarius (Linnaeus, 1758)

= Crabro =

Genus of wasps

Crabro is a genus of square-headed wasps belonging to the family Crabronidae. There are at least 80 described species in Crabro, found in the Nearctic and Palaearctic (Holarctic).

== Species ==
- Crabro advena F. Smith, 1856
- Crabro aequalis W. Fox, 1895
- Crabro alashanicus Marshakov, 1976
- Crabro alpestris Cameron, 1891
- Crabro alpinus Imhoff, 1863
- Crabro altaicus F. Morawitz, 1892
- Crabro alticola Cameron, 1891
- Crabro altigena Dalla Torre, 1897
- Crabro arcadiensis R. Miller, 1976
- Crabro argusinus R. Bohart in R. Bohart & Menke, 1976
- Crabro atlanticus R. Miller, 1976
- Crabro bruneri (Mickel, 1916)
- Crabro canningsi Finnamore, 1988
- Crabro carabili Nesterov, 1994
- Crabro caspicus (F. Morawitz, 1888)
- Crabro chalybeus Kohl, 1915
- Crabro cingulatus (Packard, 1867)
- Crabro cognatus W. Fox, 1895
- Crabro comberi Leclercq, 1950
- Crabro comosiceps R. Bohart, 1976
- Crabro conspicuus Cresson, 1865
- Crabro costaricensis Cameron, 1891
- Crabro cribrarius (Linnaeus, 1758)
- Crabro cribrellifer (Packard, 1867)
- Crabro denningi R. Bohart, 1976
- Crabro deserticola R. Bohart, 1976
- Crabro dietrichi R. Bohart, 1976
- Crabro digitatus R. Bohart, 1976
- Crabro femoralis F. Morawitz, 1892
- Crabro filiformis Radoszkowski, 1877
- Crabro flavicrus R. Bohart, 1976
- Crabro flavinubis R. Bohart, 1976
- Crabro flavoniger Dutt, 1921
- Crabro florissantensis Rohwer, 1909
- Crabro fratellus Kohl, 1915
- Crabro funestus Kohl, 1915
- Crabro grisselli R. Bohart, 1976
- Crabro helvocrinus R. Bohart, 1976
- Crabro henrici Krombein in Muesebeck et al., 1951
- Crabro hilaris F. Smith, 1856
- Crabro hispidus W. Fox, 1895
- Crabro ingricus (F. Morawitz, 1888)
- Crabro jordanicus Guichard, 1991
- Crabro korbi (Kohl, 1883)
- Crabro lacteipennis Rohwer, 1909
- Crabro lapponicus Zetterstedt, 1838
- Crabro largior W. Fox, 1895
- Crabro latipes F. Smith, 1856
- Crabro leopardus R. Bohart, 1976
- Crabro loewi Dahlbom, 1845
- Crabro maeklini A. Morawitz, 1866
- Crabro malyshevi L. Ahrens, 1933
- Crabro marshakovi Kazenas, 1984
- Crabro mocsaryi Kohl, 1915
- Crabro mongolicus Tsuneki, 1959
- Crabro monticola (Packard, 1867)
- Crabro nigriceps R. Bohart, 1976
- Crabro nigrostriatus R. Bohart, 1976
- Crabro nomgoni Marshakov, 1980
- Crabro occultus Fabricius, 1804
- Crabro opalescens R. Bohart, 1976
- Crabro pallidus W. Fox, 1895
- Crabro parmatulus R. Bohart, 1976
- Crabro peltarius (Schreber, 1784)
- Crabro peltatus Fabricius, 1793
- Crabro peltista Kohl, 1888
- Crabro pleuralis W. Fox, 1895
- Crabro pubens Marshakov, 1976
- Crabro pugillator A. Costa, 1867
- Crabro rufibasis (Banks, 1921)
- Crabro scutellatus (von Scheven, 1781)
- Crabro sibiricus A. Morawitz, 1866
- Crabro signaticrus F. Morawitz, 1893
- Crabro snowii W. Fox, 1896
- Crabro spinuliferus R. Bohart, 1976
- Crabro tenuiglossa (Packard, 1866)
- Crabro tenuis W. Fox, 1895
- Crabro thyreophorus Kohl, 1888
- Crabro tuberculiger Kohl, 1915
- Crabro tumidus (Packard, 1867)
- Crabro uljanini Radoszkowski, 1877
- Crabro ussuriensis Gussakovskij, 1932
- Crabro velitaris R. Bohart, 1976
- Crabro venator (Rohwer, 1911)
- Crabro vernalis (Packard, 1867)
- Crabro villosus W. Fox, 1895
- Crabro virgatus W. Fox, 1895
- Crabro werestschagini Gussakovskij, 1932
