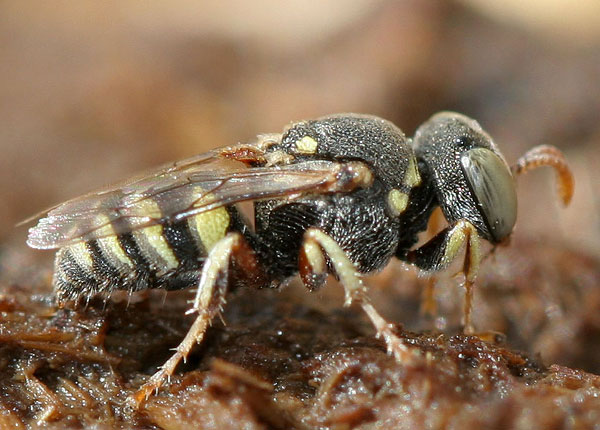
- Oxybelus lamellatus

Scientific classification
- Kingdom: Animalia
- Phylum: Arthropoda
- Class: Insecta
- Order: Hymenoptera
- Family: Crabronidae
- Tribe: Oxybelini
- Genus: Oxybelus; Latreille, 1797

= Oxybelus =

Genus of wasps

Oxybelus argentatus carrying a stiletto fly (Thereva sp.) into her nest.

Oxybelus is a genus of wasps in the family Crabronidae, commonly known as "spiny digger wasps". The species are found worldwide except in the Australasian realm. They are especially represented in the Palearctic. Oxybelus is the largest genus in Crabronidae, with 264 species known.

== Species (Europe) ==
- Oxybelus argentatus Curtis 1833
- Oxybelus aurantiacus Mocsary 1883
- Oxybelus bipunctatus Olivier 1812
- Oxybelus cocacolae P. Verhoeff 1968
- Oxybelus diphyllus (A. Costa 1882)
- Oxybelus dissectus Dahlbom 1845
- Oxybelus dusmeti Mingo Perez 1966
- Oxybelus fischeri Spinola 1839
- Oxybelus haemorrhoidalis Olivier 1812
- Oxybelus hastatus Fabricius 1804
- Oxybelus lamellatus Olivier 1811
- Oxybelus latidens Gerstaecker 1867
- Oxybelus latro Olivier 1812
- Oxybelus lineatus (Fabricius 1787)
- Oxybelus maculipes F. Smith 1856
- Oxybelus mandibularis Dahlbom 1845
- Oxybelus mucronatus (Fabricius 1793)
- Oxybelus occitanicus Marquet 1896
- Oxybelus polyacanthus A. Costa 1882
- Oxybelus quatuordecimnotatus Jurine 1807
- Oxybelus spectabilis Gerstaecker 1867
- Oxybelus subspinosus Klug 1835
- Oxybelus trispinosus (Fabricius 1787)
- Oxybelus uniglumis (Linnaeus 1758)
- Oxybelus variegatus Wesmael 1852

== See also ==
- List of Oxybelus species
