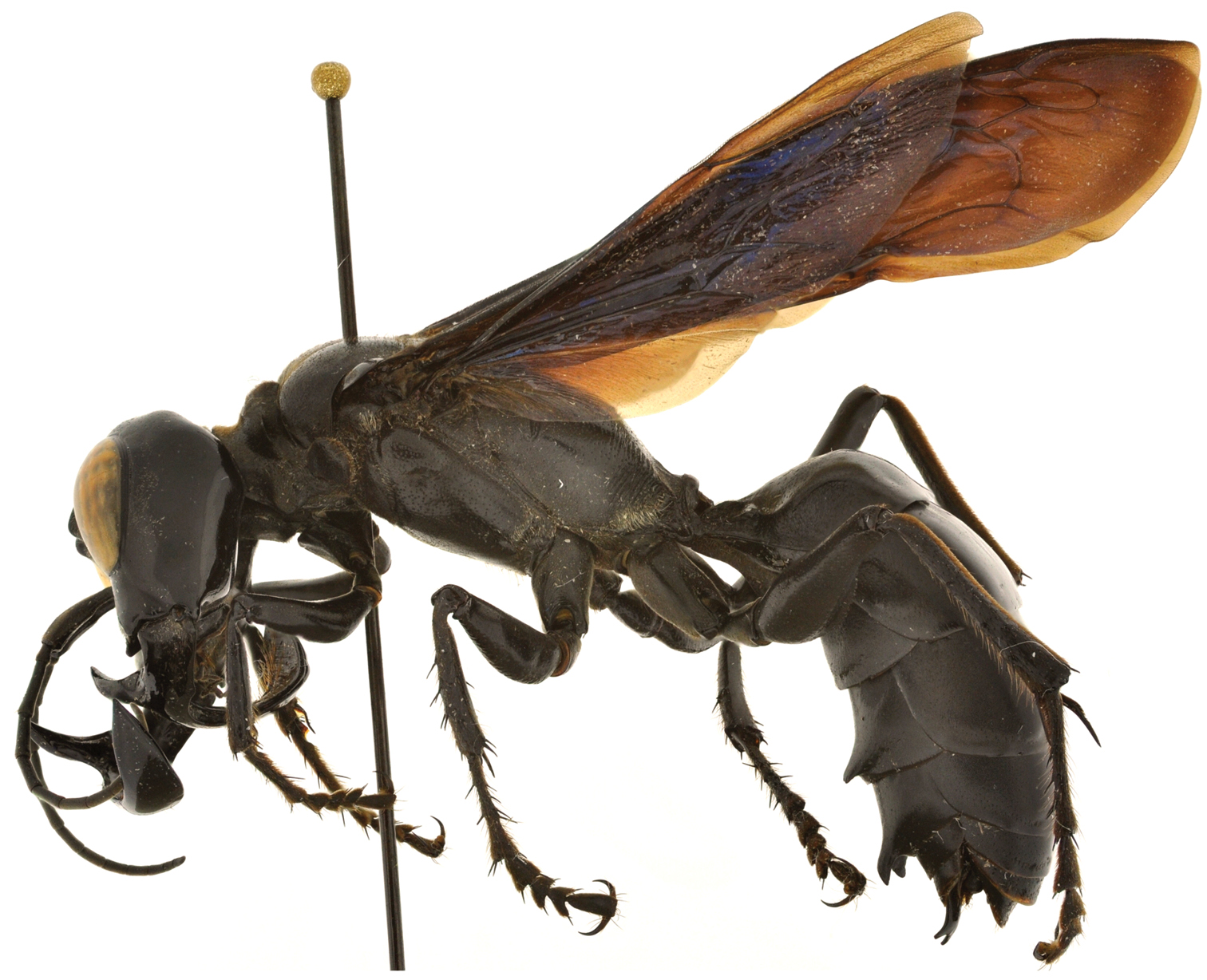
- Male (large morph)
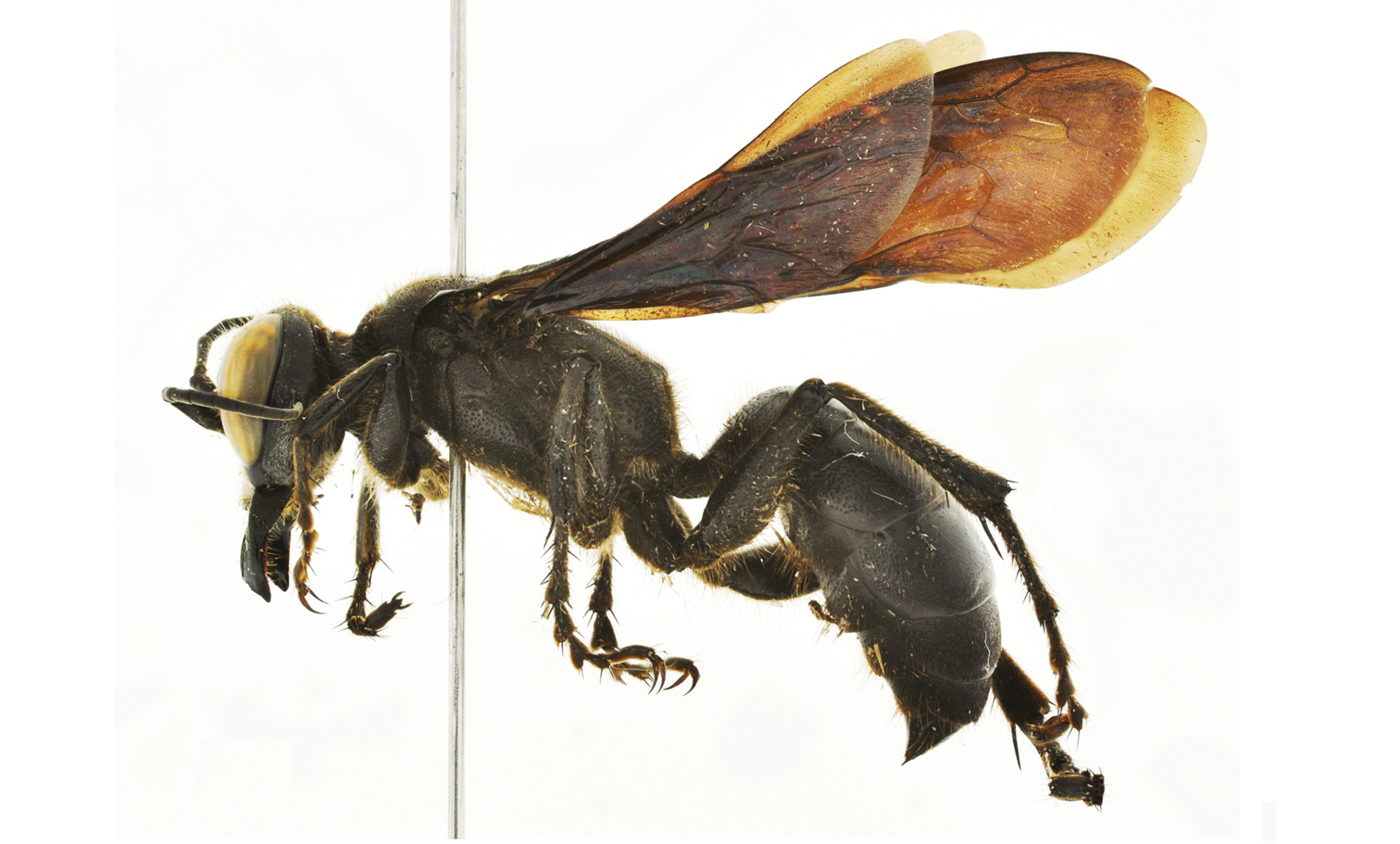
- Female

Scientific classification
- Kingdom: Animalia
- Phylum: Arthropoda
- Clade: Pancrustacea
- Class: Insecta
- Order: Hymenoptera
- Family: Crabronidae
- Subfamily: Crabroninae
- Tribe: Larrini
- Subtribe: Larrina
- Genus: Megalara; Kimsey, Ohl, & Ubaidillah 2012
- Species: M. garuda

Binomial name
- Megalara garuda Kimsey, Ohl, & Ubaidillah 2012

= Megalara =

Megalara garuda

Genus of wasps

Megalara garuda, colloquially referred to as the king of wasps or Garuda wasp, is a large wasp and the only species in the genus Megalara, family Crabronidae, tribe Larrini. The wasp is only known from the Mekongga Mountains in the southeastern part of the Indonesian island of Sulawesi. It was described in 2012 by Lynn Kimsey, director of the Bohart Museum of Entomology and professor of entomology at the University of California, Davis, and Michael Ohl, curator and head of entomology at the Museum für Naturkunde, Berlin. Rosichon Ubaidillah from the Indonesian Institute of Sciences also contributed the discovery.

In March 2012, the full species description was published. The species is named after the Garuda bird, the National Symbol of Indonesia. This species of wasp has never been observed alive or in flight.

== Description ==
Males of one morph are about 3.3 cm (1.3 in) long, with very large jaws. Their elongated mandibles are almost as long as their forelegs. Males of the other morph and all females have proportionally smaller jaws and are overall smaller at about 2.0–2.5 cm (0.8–1.0 in), but still larger than other species in the subfamily. Both sexes are shiny black with black wings. It is a solitary predator of other insect species. Very little is known about the sting of Megalara.
