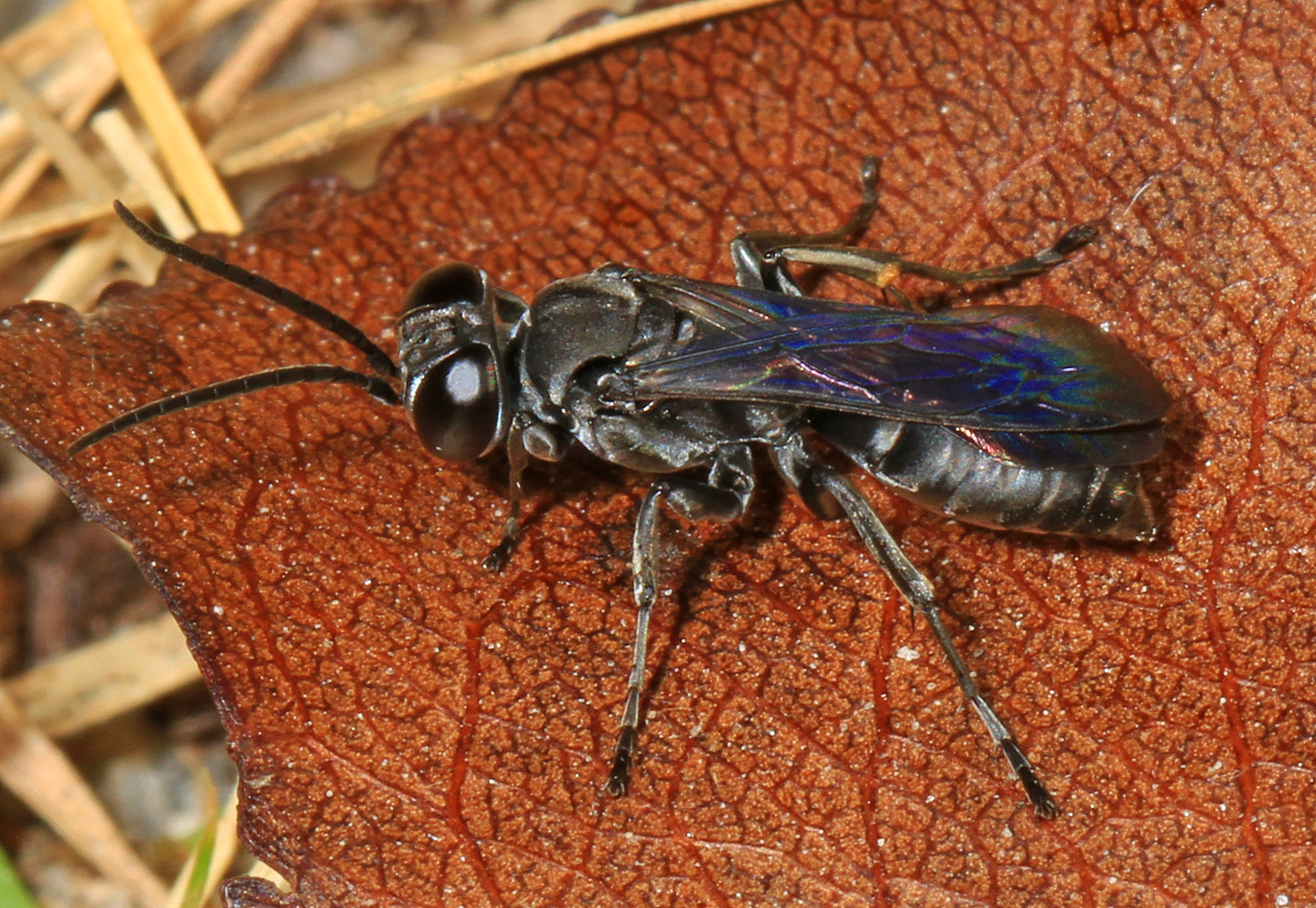
- Liris sp. in Woodbridge, Virginia

Scientific classification
- Kingdom: Animalia
- Phylum: Arthropoda
- Class: Insecta
- Order: Hymenoptera
- Family: Crabronidae
- Subtribe: Larrina
- Genus: Liris; Fabricius, 1804

Subgenera
- Liris (Leptolarra); Liris (Motes)

Synonyms
- Lirisis Rafinesque, 1804; Notogonia A. Costa, 1867; Motes Kohl, 1897; Caenolarra Cameron, 1900; Leptolarra Cameron, 1900; Spanolarra Cameron, 1900; Notogonius Howard, 1901; Chrysolarra Cameron, 1901; Notogonidea Rohwer, 1911; Dociliris Tsuneki, 1967; Nigliris Tsuneki, 1967; Colloliris Tsuneki, 1974; Pitaliris Tsuneki, 1982

= Liris (wasp) =

Genus of insects

Liris is a genus of solitary, ground-nesting, predaceous wasps, containing over 300 species. Two of its three subgenera, Leptolarra and Motes, are found in North America, with 23 species representing Leptolarra and a single species representing Motes. Liris wasps typically prey on crickets, which they use to provision their nests.

== Subgenera ==
- Liris (Leptolarra)
- Liris (Liris)
- Liris (Motes)

== See also ==
- List of Liris species
