= List of Crossocerus species =

This is a list of 252 species in Crossocerus, a genus of square-headed wasps in the family Crabronidae.

== Crossocerus species ==
- Crossocerus acanthophorus (Kohl, 1892)^{i c g}
- Crossocerus acephalus Leclercq, 1958^{i c g}
- Crossocerus adhaesus (Kohl, 1915)^{i c g}
- Crossocerus aeta Pate, 1944^{i c g}
- Crossocerus alticola Tsuneki, 1968^{i c g}
- Crossocerus amurensis (Kohl, 1892)^{i c g}
- Crossocerus angelicus (Kincaid, 1900)^{i c g}
- Crossocerus angolae Leclercq, 2008^{i c g}
- Crossocerus angulifemur Leclercq and Miller in Leclerq, 2000^{i c g}
- Crossocerus annandali (Bingham, 1908)^{i c g}
- Crossocerus annulipes (Lepeletier de Saint Fargeau and Brullé, 1835)^{i c g}
- Crossocerus antropovi Schmid-Egger, 2011^{i c g}
- Crossocerus aponis Tsuneki, 1984^{i c g}
- Crossocerus aposanus Tsuneki, 1984^{i c g}
- Crossocerus arcorum Leclercq^{c g}
- Crossocerus ardens (Cameron, 1890)^{i c g}
- Crossocerus ariminensis Terayama and Murota, 2016^{i g}
- Crossocerus arnoldi Leclercq and Miller in Leclerq, 2000^{i c g}
- Crossocerus assamensis (Cameron, 1902)^{i c g}
- Crossocerus assimilis (F. Smith, 1856)^{i c g}
- Crossocerus aswad (Nurse, 1902)^{i c g}
- Crossocerus bajaensis Leclercq and Miller in Leclerq, 2000^{i c g}
- Crossocerus barbipes (Dahlbom, 1845)^{i c g}
- Crossocerus binicarinalis Li and Wu, 2003^{i c g}
- Crossocerus binotatus Lepeletier de Saint Fargeau and Brullé, 1835^{i c g}
- Crossocerus bispinosus de Beaumont, 1967^{i c g}
- Crossocerus bnun Tsuneki, 1971^{i c g}
- Crossocerus boharti Leclercq and Miller in Leclerq, 2000^{i c g}
- Crossocerus brahmanus Leclercq, 1956^{i c g}
- Crossocerus breviclypeatus Tsuneki, 1977^{i c g}
- Crossocerus brooksi Leclercq and Miller in Leclerq, 2000^{i c g}
- Crossocerus brunniventris (Arnold, 1932)^{i c g}
- Crossocerus bukavu Leclercq, 2008^{i c g}
- Crossocerus bulawayoensis (Arnold, 1932)^{i c g}
- Crossocerus burungaensis (Arnold, 1934)^{i c g}
- Crossocerus callani Pate, 1941^{i c g}
- Crossocerus cameroni Leclercq and Miller in Leclerq, 2000^{i c g}
- Crossocerus capax Leclercq, 2008^{i c g}
- Crossocerus capitalis Leclercq, 1958^{i c g}
- Crossocerus capitosus (Shuckard, 1837)^{i c g}
- Crossocerus carinicollaris Li and Wu, 2006^{i c g}
- Crossocerus cetratus (Shuckard, 1837)^{i c g}
- Crossocerus chiapensis Leclercq and Miller in Leclerq, 2000^{i c g}
- Crossocerus chromatipus Pate, 1944^{i c g}
- Crossocerus cinxius (Dahlbom, 1839)^{i c g}
- Crossocerus congener (Dahlbom, 1844)^{i c g}
- Crossocerus decorosus Leclercq and Miller in Leclerq, 2000^{i c g}
- Crossocerus decorus (W. Fox, 1895)^{i c g}
- Crossocerus denticoxa (Bischoff, 1932)^{i c g}
- Crossocerus denticrus Herrich-Schaeffer, 1841^{i c g}
- Crossocerus dimidiatus (Fabricius, 1781)^{i c g}
- Crossocerus distinguendus (A. Morawitz, 1866)^{i c g}
- Crossocerus distortus Leclercq, 1955^{i c g}
- Crossocerus domicola Tsuneki, 1971^{i c g}
- Crossocerus elongatulus (Vander Linden, 1829)^{i c g}
- Crossocerus emarginatus (Kohl, 1899)^{i c g}
- Crossocerus emirorum Leclercq, 1998^{i c g}
- Crossocerus epiri Leclercq, 2007^{i c g}
- Crossocerus eques (Nurse, 1902)^{i c g}
- Crossocerus eriogoni (Rohwer, 1908)^{i c g}
- Crossocerus esau de Beaumont, 1967^{i c g}
- Crossocerus evansi Leclercq and Miller in Leclerq, 2000^{i c g}
- Crossocerus exdentatus Li and L.F. Yang, 2002^{i c g}
- Crossocerus exiguus (Vander Linden, 1829)^{i c g}
- Crossocerus fabreorum Leclercq and Terzo, 2007^{i c g}
- Crossocerus federationis Leclercq, 1961^{i c g}
- Crossocerus fergusoni Pate, 1944^{i c g}
- Crossocerus flavissimus Leclercq, 1973^{i c g}
- Crossocerus flavitarsus (Tsuneki, 1947)^{i c g}
- Crossocerus flavomaculatus Li and He, 2005^{i c g}
- Crossocerus flavopictus (F. Smith, 1856)^{i c g}
- Crossocerus floresus Leclercq, 1978^{i c g}
- Crossocerus fossuleus Leclercq, 1958^{i c g}
- Crossocerus foxi Leclercq and Miller in Leclerq, 2000^{i c g}
- Crossocerus fukuiensis Tsuneki, 1970^{i c g}
- Crossocerus gaboni Leclercq, 2008^{i c g}
- Crossocerus gemblacensis Leclercq, 1968^{i c g}
- Crossocerus gerardi Leclercq, 1956^{i c g}
- Crossocerus glabricornis (Arnold, 1926)^{i c g}
- Crossocerus guerrerensis (Cameron, 1891)^{i c g}
- Crossocerus guichardi Leclercq, 1972^{i c g}
- Crossocerus hakusanus Tsuneki, 1954^{i c g}
- Crossocerus harringtonii (W. Fox, 1895)^{i c g}
- Crossocerus hasalakae Leclercq, 1986^{i c g}
- Crossocerus heinrichi Leclercq, 1974^{i c g}
- Crossocerus hewitti (Cameron, 1908)^{c g}
- Crossocerus heydeni Kohl, 1880^{i c g}
- Crossocerus hingstoni Leclercq, 1950^{i c g}
- Crossocerus hirashimai Tsuneki, 1966^{i c g}
- Crossocerus hirtitibia (Arnold, 1945)^{i c g}
- Crossocerus hiurai Tsuneki, 1966^{i c g}
- Crossocerus hospitalis Leclercq, 1961^{i c g}
- Crossocerus impressifrons (F. Smith, 1856)^{i c g b}
- Crossocerus indonesiae Leclercq, 1961^{i c g}
- Crossocerus insolens (W. Fox, 1895)^{i c g}
- Crossocerus inundatiflavus Li and He, 2004^{i c g}
- Crossocerus italicus de Beaumont, 1959^{i c g}
- Crossocerus jason (Cameron, 1891)^{i c g}
- Crossocerus jasonoides Leclercq, 2000^{i c g}
- Crossocerus jubilans (Kohl, 1915)^{i c g}
- Crossocerus kamateensis Tsuneki, 1971^{i c g}
- Crossocerus klapperichi de Beaumont, 1963^{i c g}
- Crossocerus kockensis Leclercq, 1950^{i c g}
- Crossocerus kohli (Bischoff, 1921)^{i c g}
- Crossocerus krombeini Leclercq and Miller in Leclerq, 2000^{i c g}
- Crossocerus kurczewskii Leclercq and Miller in Leclerq, 2000^{i c g}
- Crossocerus larutae Leclercq, 1961^{i c g}
- Crossocerus lentus (W. Fox, 1895)^{i c g}
- Crossocerus leucostoma (Linnaeus, 1758)^{i c g}
- Crossocerus lindbergi (de Beaumont, 1954)^{i c g}
- Crossocerus lipatus Leclercq, 1961^{i c g}
- Crossocerus lippensi Leclercq, 1958^{i c g}
- Crossocerus liqiangi Leclercq, 2009^{c g}
- Crossocerus liquiangi Leclercq, 2009^{i c g}
- Crossocerus lokojae Leclercq, 2008^{i c g}
- Crossocerus lundbladi (Kjellander, 1954)^{i c g}
- Crossocerus maculiclypeus (W. Fox, 1895)^{i c g}
- Crossocerus maculipennis (F. Smith, 1856)^{i c g}
- Crossocerus maculitarsis (Cameron, 1891)^{i c g}
- Crossocerus magniceps Tsuneki, 1977^{i c g}
- Crossocerus malaisei (Gussakovskij, 1932)^{i c g}
- Crossocerus medidentatus Li and Wu, 2003^{i c g}
- Crossocerus megacephalus (Rossi, 1790)^{i c g}
- Crossocerus melanius (Rohwer, 1911)^{i c g}
- Crossocerus melanochilos Pate, 1944^{i c g}
- Crossocerus mexicanus Leclercq and Miller in Leclerq, 2000^{i c g}
- Crossocerus micemarginatus Li and He, 2004^{i c g}
- Crossocerus microcollaris (Li and He, 2001)^{i c g}
- Crossocerus micromegas (de Saussure, 1892)^{i c g}
- Crossocerus miellati Leclercq, 1961^{i c g}
- Crossocerus minamikawai Tsuneki, 1966^{i c g}
- Crossocerus mindanaonis Tsuneki, 1984^{i c g}
- Crossocerus minimus (Packard, 1867)^{i c g}
- Crossocerus minor Tsuneki, 1990^{i c g}
- Crossocerus minotaurus Leclercq, 2009^{i c g}
- Crossocerus minutulus (Arnold, 1944)^{i c g}
- Crossocerus morawitzi (Gussakovskij, 1952)^{i c g}
- Crossocerus mukalanae Leclercq, 1986^{i c g}
- Crossocerus neimongolensis Li and L.F. Yang, 2002^{i c g}
- Crossocerus nemeci Ríha, 2008^{i c g}
- Crossocerus nigritus (Lepeletier de Saint Fargeau and Brullé, 1835)^{i c g}
- Crossocerus nikkoensis Tsuneki and Tanaka, 1955^{i c g}
- Crossocerus nitidicorpus Tsuneki, 1968^{i c g}
- Crossocerus nitidiventris (W. Fox, 1892)^{i c g b}
- Crossocerus noonadanus Tsuneki, 1976^{i c g}
- Crossocerus odontochilus Li and Yang, 1995^{i c g}
- Crossocerus onoi (Yasumatsu, 1939)^{i c g}
- Crossocerus opacifrons (Tsuneki, 1947)^{i c g}
- Crossocerus ornatipes (R. Turner, 1918)^{i c g}
- Crossocerus ovalis Lepeletier de Saint Fargeau and Brullé, 1835^{i c g}
- Crossocerus ovchinnikovi Kazenas, 2007^{i c g}
- Crossocerus pakistanus Leclercq, 2009^{i c g}
- Crossocerus palmipes (Linnaeus, 1767)^{i c g}
- Crossocerus parcorum Leclercq, 1958^{i c g}
- Crossocerus patei Leclercq and Miller in Leclerq, 2000^{i c g}
- Crossocerus pazensis Leclercq, 2000^{i c g}
- Crossocerus peckorum Leclercq, 2000^{i c g}
- Crossocerus perpolitus Leclercq, 1978^{i c g}
- Crossocerus perpusillus (Walker, 1871)^{i c g}
- Crossocerus phaeochilos Pate, 1944^{i c g}
- Crossocerus pignatus Leclercq, 1968^{i c g}
- Crossocerus planifemur Krombein, 1952^{i c g}
- Crossocerus pleuracutus Leclercq, 1973^{i c g}
- Crossocerus pleuralis Leclercq and Miller in Leclerq, 2000^{i c g}
- Crossocerus pleuralituberculi Li and He, 2004^{i c g}
- Crossocerus podagricus (Vander Linden, 1829)^{i c g}
- Crossocerus porexus Leclercq, 1968^{i c g}
- Crossocerus pseudochromatipus Leclercq and Miller in Leclerq, 2000^{i c g}
- Crossocerus pseudomexicanus Leclercq and Miller in Leclerq, 2000^{i c g}
- Crossocerus pseudopalmarius (Gussakovskij, 1932)^{i c g}
- Crossocerus pueblensis Leclercq, 2000^{i c g}
- Crossocerus puertagarnicae Leclercq and Miller in Leclerq, 2000^{i c g}
- Crossocerus pullulus (A. Morawitz, 1866)^{i c g}
- Crossocerus punctivertex Leclercq and Miller in Leclerq, 2000^{i c g}
- Crossocerus pusanoides Leclercq, 1963^{i c g}
- Crossocerus pusanus Leclercq, 1956^{i c g}
- Crossocerus pyrrhus Leclercq, 1956^{i c g}
- Crossocerus quadrimaculatus (Fabricius, 1793)^{i c g}
- Crossocerus quinlani Leclercq, 1989^{i c g}
- Crossocerus quinquedentatus Tsuneki, 1971^{i c g}
- Crossocerus rasnitsyni Kazenas, 2011^{i c g}
- Crossocerus raui Rohwer, 1923^{i c g}
- Crossocerus rectangularis (Gussakovskij, 1952)^{i c g}
- Crossocerus repositus (Arnold, 1944)^{i c g}
- Crossocerus rimatus Leclercq, 1963^{i c g}
- Crossocerus riparius (Arnold, 1926)^{i c g}
- Crossocerus ruandensis (Arnold, 1932)^{i c g}
- Crossocerus rubromaculatus Tsuneki, 1982^{i c g}
- Crossocerus rudipunctatus Li and Wu, 2006^{i c g}
- Crossocerus rufiventris Tsuneki, 1968^{i c g}
- Crossocerus rugosilateralis Li and Yang, 2003^{i c g}
- Crossocerus ruwenzoriensis (Arnold, 1926)^{i c g}
- Crossocerus sabahensis Leclercq, 1974^{i c g}
- Crossocerus sauteri Tsuneki, 1977^{i c g}
- Crossocerus sciaphillus Leclercq, 1961^{i c g}
- Crossocerus segregatus Leclercq, 1958^{i c g}
- Crossocerus senonus Leclercq, 1961^{i c g}
- Crossocerus shibuyai (Iwata, 1934)^{i c g}
- Crossocerus shirakii Tsuneki, 1986^{i c g}
- Crossocerus similis (W. Fox, 1895)^{i c g}
- Crossocerus simlaensis (Nurse, 1902)^{i c g}
- Crossocerus sinicus Leclercq, 1954^{i c g}
- Crossocerus slimmatus Leclercq, 1963^{i c g}
- Crossocerus sotirus Leclercq, 1963^{i c g}
- Crossocerus spinigeroides Leclercq and Miller in Leclerq, 2000^{i c g}
- Crossocerus spinigerus (Cameron, 1904)^{i c g}
- Crossocerus stangei Leclercq, 2000^{i c g}
- Crossocerus stictochilos Pate, 1944^{i c g}
- Crossocerus strangulatus (Bischoff, 1930)^{i c g}
- Crossocerus stricklandi Pate, 1944^{i c g}
- Crossocerus styrius (Kohl, 1892)^{i c g}
- Crossocerus subulatus (Dahlbom, 1845)^{i c g}
- Crossocerus sulcatus Li and Fang, 2003^{i c g}
- Crossocerus surusumi Tsuneki, 1971^{i c g}
- Crossocerus suzukii (Matsumura, 1912)^{i c g}
- Crossocerus taiwanus Tsuneki, 1968^{i c g}
- Crossocerus takasago Tsuneki, 1966^{i c g}
- Crossocerus takeuchii Tsuneki and Tanaka, 1955^{i c g}
- Crossocerus tanakai Tsuneki, 1954^{i c g}
- Crossocerus tanoi Tsuneki, 1968^{i c g}
- Crossocerus tarsalis (W. Fox, 1895)^{i c g}
- Crossocerus tarsatus (Shuckard, 1837)^{i c g}
- Crossocerus taru de Beaumont, 1967^{i c g}
- Crossocerus taxus Leclercq, 1956^{i c g}
- Crossocerus toledensis Leclercq, 1971^{i c g}
- Crossocerus tolucae Leclercq, 2000^{i c g}
- Crossocerus topilego Leclercq and Miller in Leclerq, 2000^{i c g}
- Crossocerus traductor (Nurse, 1902)^{i c g}
- Crossocerus tropicalis (Arnold, 1947)^{i c g}
- Crossocerus trucidus Leclercq, 1974^{i c g}
- Crossocerus tsuifengensis Tsuneki, 1968^{i c g}
- Crossocerus tsunekii Leclercq and Miller in Leclerq, 2000^{i c g}
- Crossocerus turneri (Arnold, 1927)^{i c g}
- Crossocerus tyuzendzianus Tsuneki, 1954^{i c g}
- Crossocerus uchidai (Tsuneki, 1947)^{i c g}
- Crossocerus unicus (Patton, 1879)^{i c g}
- Crossocerus unidentatus Li and L. Yang, 2001^{i c g}
- Crossocerus upembae Leclercq, 2008^{i c g}
- Crossocerus ursidus Leclercq, 1956^{i c g}
- Crossocerus vagabundus (Panzer, 1798)^{i c g}
- Crossocerus varus Lepeletier de Saint Fargeau and Brullé, 1835^{i c g}
- Crossocerus vepectineus Li and He, 2004^{i c g}
- Crossocerus viennensis Leclercq, 1968^{i c g}
- Crossocerus walkeri (Shuckard, 1837)^{i c g}
- Crossocerus weeratungei Leclercq, 1986^{i c g}
- Crossocerus wesmaeli (Vander Linden, 1829)^{i c g}
- Crossocerus xanthochilos Pate, 1944^{i c g}
- Crossocerus xanthognathus (Rohwer, 1911)^{i c g}
- Crossocerus xizangensis Li and L. Yang, 2001^{i c g}
- Crossocerus yanoi (Tsuneki, 1947)^{i c g}
- Crossocerus yasumatsui (Tsuneki, 1947)^{i c g}
- Crossocerus yerburii (Cameron, 1898)^{i c g}

Data sources: i = ITIS, c = Catalogue of Life, g = GBIF, b = Bugguide.net
