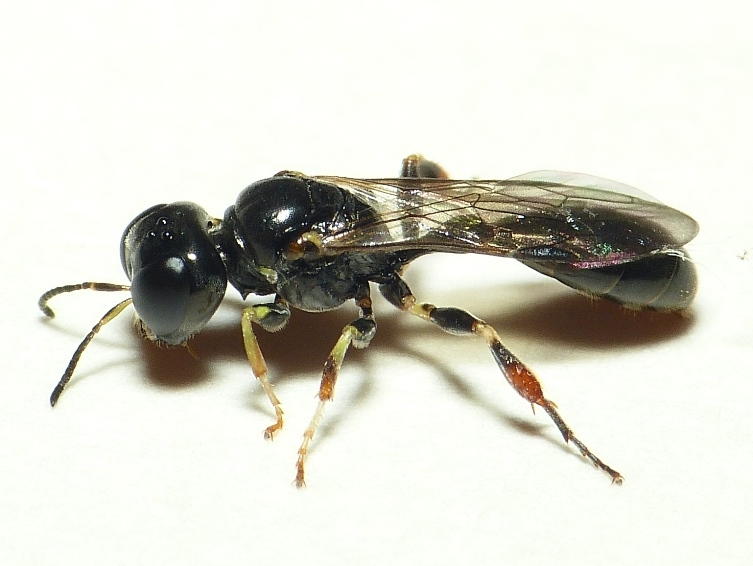
- Rhopalum coarctatum Rhenen the Netherlands

Scientific classification
- Domain: Eukaryota
- Kingdom: Animalia
- Phylum: Arthropoda
- Class: Insecta
- Order: Hymenoptera
- Family: Crabronidae
- Subfamily: Crabroninae
- Tribe: Crabronini
- Genus: Rhopalum
- Species: R. coarctatum

Binomial name
- Rhopalum coarctatum (Scopoli 1763)

= Rhopalum coarctatum =

Species of wasp

Rhopalum coarctatum is a Palearctic species of solitary wasp.
