= Crossocerus capitosus =

Scientific classification
- Domain: Eukaryota
- Kingdom: Animalia
- Phylum: Arthropoda
- Class: Insecta
- Order: Hymenoptera
- Family: Crabronidae
- Subfamily: Crabroninae
- Tribe: Crabronini
- Genus: Crossocerus
- Species: C. capitosus

Binomial name
- Crossocerus capitosus (Shuckard, 1837)

Species of wasp

Crossocerus capitosus is a Palearctic species of solitary wasp.
