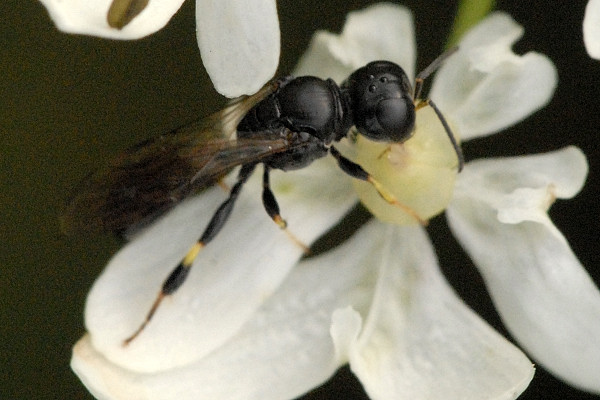
- Crossocerus.elongatulus Ardennes

Scientific classification
- Kingdom: Animalia
- Phylum: Arthropoda
- Clade: Pancrustacea
- Class: Insecta
- Order: Hymenoptera
- Family: Crabronidae
- Subfamily: Crabroninae
- Tribe: Crabronini
- Genus: Crossocerus
- Species: C. elongatulus

Binomial name
- Crossocerus elongatulus (Vander Linden 1829)

= Crossocerus elongatulus =

Species of wasp

Crossocerus elongatulus is a Palearctic species of solitary wasp.
