= Great Shuttlesfield Down =

UK Site of Special Scientific Interest

Coordinates: 51.126°N 1.108°E

- Site of Special Scientific Interest
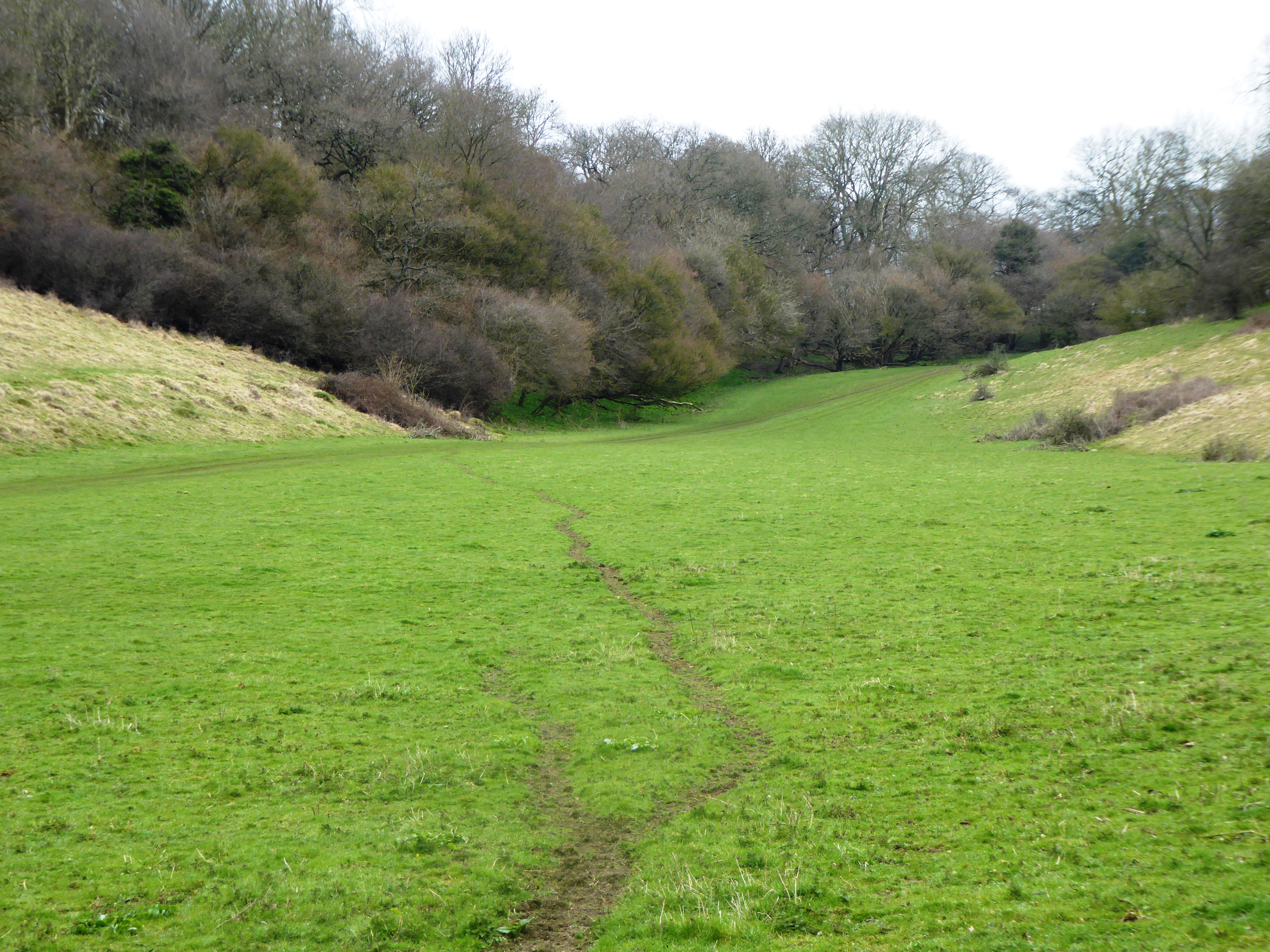
- Location of Great Shuttlesfield Down.
- Area of search: Kent
- Grid reference: TR 176 409
- Interest: Biological
- Area: 21.8 hectares (54 acres)
- Notification date: 1985
- Location map: Magic Map

Great Shuttlesfield Down is a 21.8-hectare (54-acre) biological Site of Special Scientific Interest north of Folkestone in Kent.

This unimproved grassland is dominated by Sheep's fescue, upright brome and tor-grass, and it is grazed by sheep and cattle. Notable invertebrates are the rare adonis blue butterfly and two solitary wasps, Crossocerus cetratus and Crossocerus styrius.

The site is private land but a public footpath from Lyminge crosses the northern end. All land within Great Shuttlesfield Down SSSI is owned by the Ministry of Defence.
