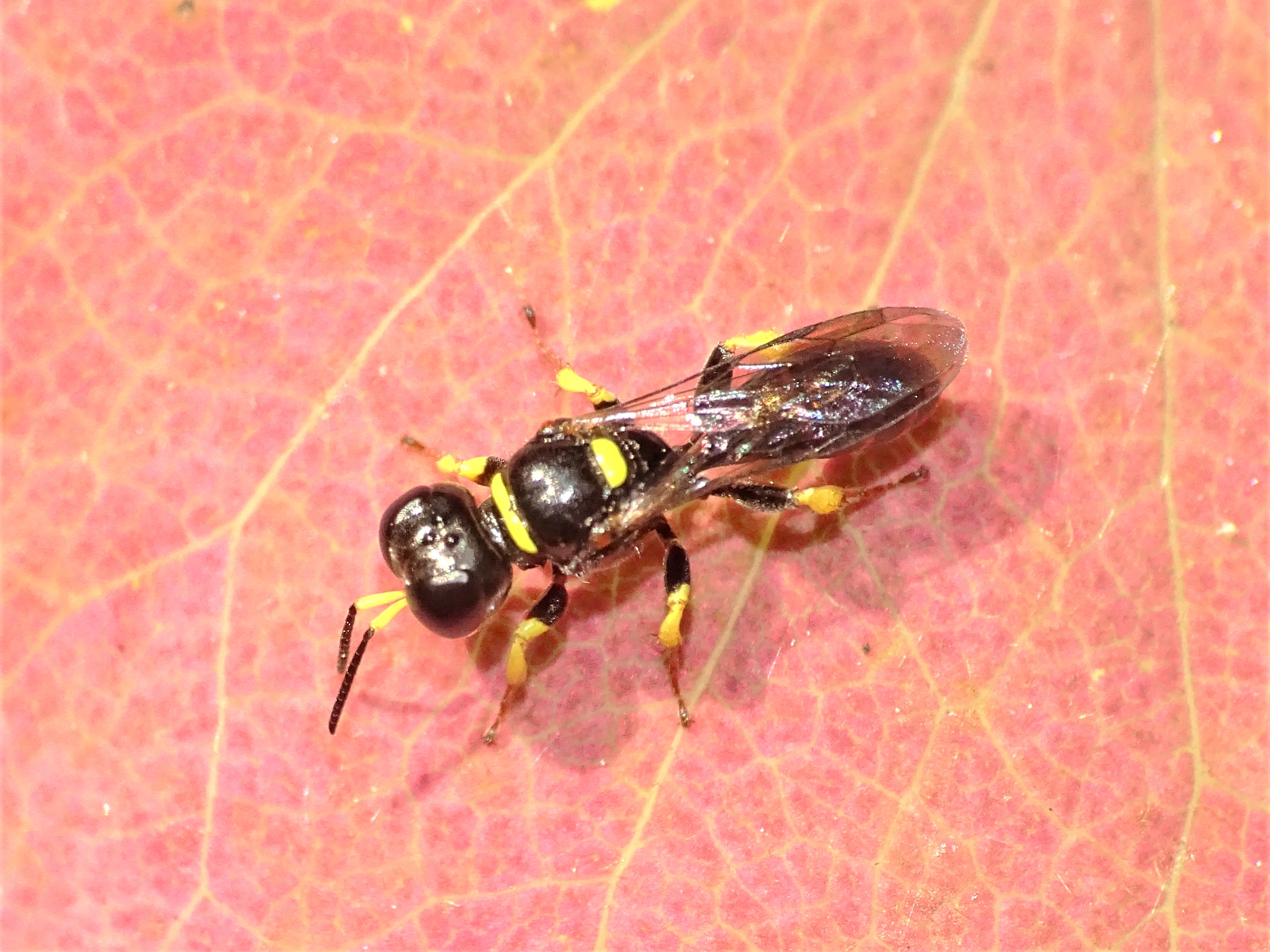

Scientific classification
- Domain: Eukaryota
- Kingdom: Animalia
- Phylum: Arthropoda
- Class: Insecta
- Order: Hymenoptera
- Family: Crabronidae
- Tribe: Crabronini
- Genus: Crossocerus
- Species: C. impressifrons

Binomial name
- Crossocerus impressifrons (F. Smith, 1856)

Synonyms
- Blepharipus harrisi Packard, 1867; Crabro harrisi (Packard, 1867); Crabro impressifrons F. Smith, 1856; Crabro tridentatus Rohwer, 1909; Crossocerus harrisi (Packard, 1867)

= Crossocerus impressifrons =

Species of wasp

Crossocerus impressifrons is a species of square-headed wasp in the family Crabronidae. It is found in North America.
