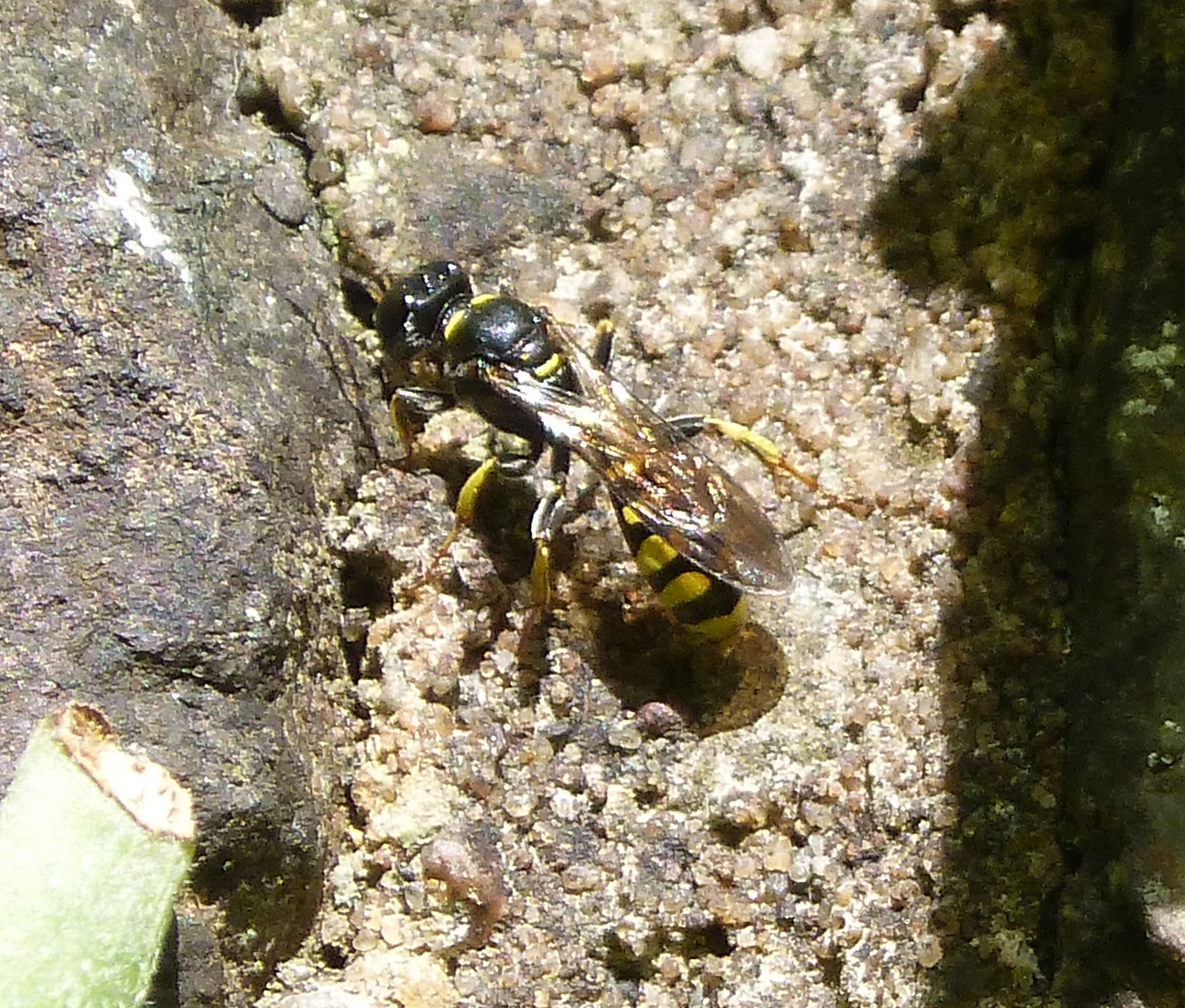
- Crossocerus quadrimaculatus England

Scientific classification
- Kingdom: Animalia
- Phylum: Arthropoda
- Clade: Pancrustacea
- Class: Insecta
- Order: Hymenoptera
- Family: Crabronidae
- Subfamily: Crabroninae
- Tribe: Crabronini
- Genus: Crossocerus
- Species: C. quadrimaculatus

Binomial name
- Crossocerus quadrimaculatus (Fabricius, 1793)

= Crossocerus quadrimaculatus =

Species of wasp

Crossocerus quadrimaculatus is a Palearctic species of solitary wasp.

== Characteristics ==
The animals reach a body length of 7 to 10.5 millimeters (females) and 6 to 8.5 millimeters (males). Their body is black-yellow colored, which is rare within the genus. Melanistic forms also occur. The terminal ridge on the edge of the occipital crest has a tooth-like projection underneath. Males usually have four yellow spots on the upper side of the abdomen. The species name quadrimaculatus is derived from Latin and means "four-spotted".

== Occurrence ==
The species is found from Europe to Siberia and in Mongolia. It inhabits warm, sandy habitats. The animals fly from the beginning of June to the middle of October. The species is widespread in Central Europe.
