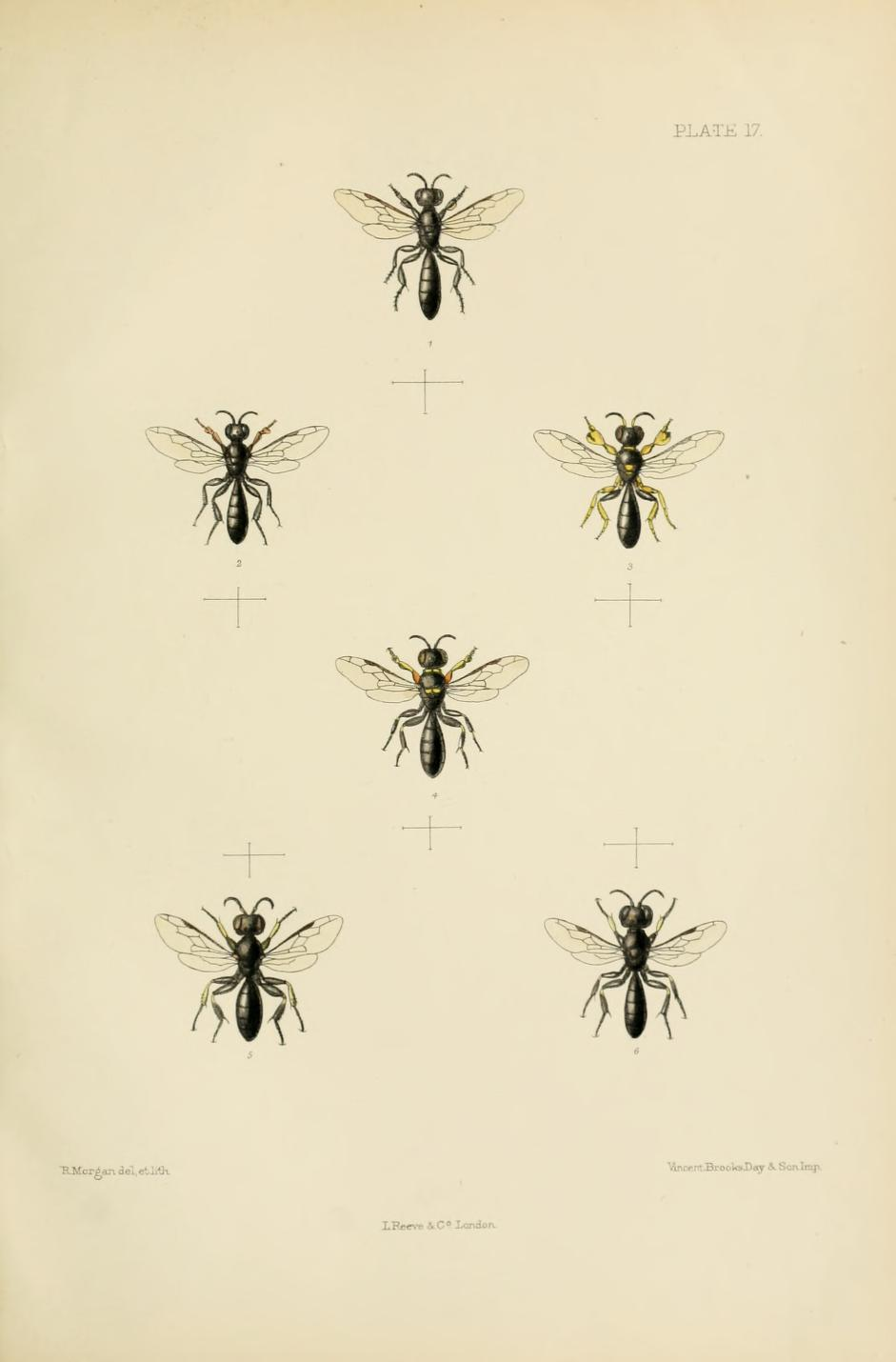
- Crossocerus cetratus in The Hymenoptera Aculeata of the British Isles (figure 1)

Scientific classification
- Domain: Eukaryota
- Kingdom: Animalia
- Phylum: Arthropoda
- Class: Insecta
- Order: Hymenoptera
- Family: Crabronidae
- Subfamily: Crabroninae
- Tribe: Crabronini
- Genus: Crossocerus
- Species: C. cetratus

Binomial name
- Crossocerus cetratus (Shuckard, 1837)

= Crossocerus cetratus =

Species of wasp

Crossocerus cetratus is a Palearctic species of wasp.
