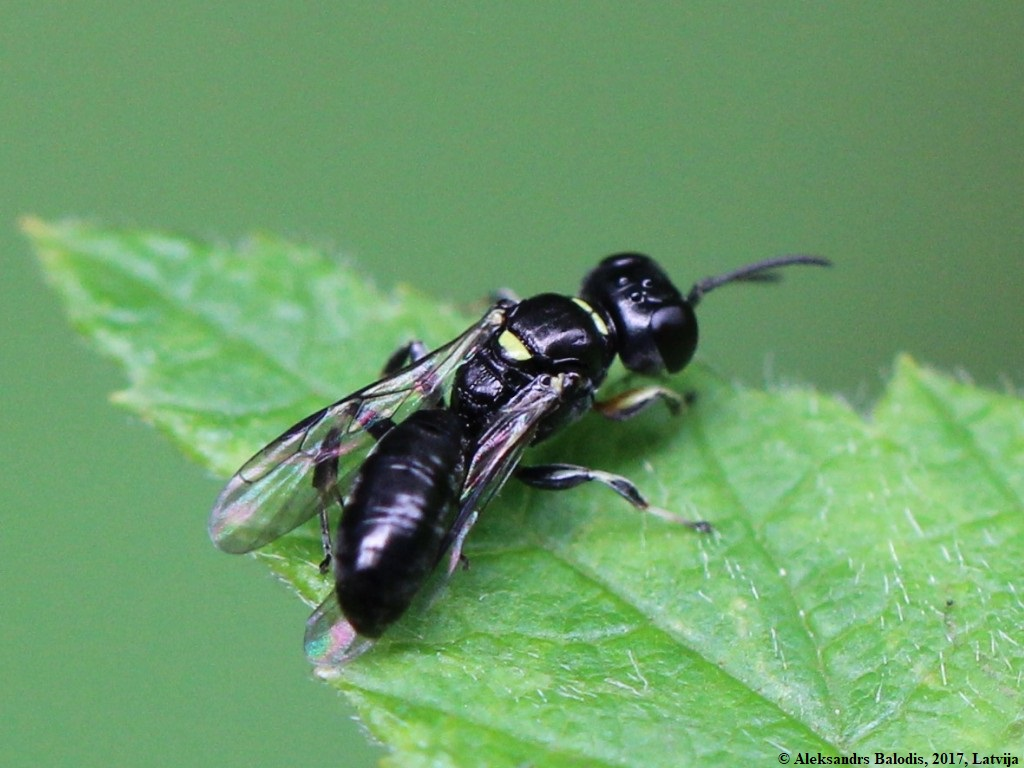

Scientific classification
- Kingdom: Animalia
- Phylum: Arthropoda
- Class: Insecta
- Order: Hymenoptera
- Family: Crabronidae
- Subfamily: Crabroninae
- Tribe: Crabronini
- Genus: Crossocerus
- Species: C. palmipes

Binomial name
- Crossocerus palmipes (Linnaeus, 1767)

= Crossocerus palmipes =

Species of wasp

Crossocerus palmipes is a Palearctic species of solitary wasp.
