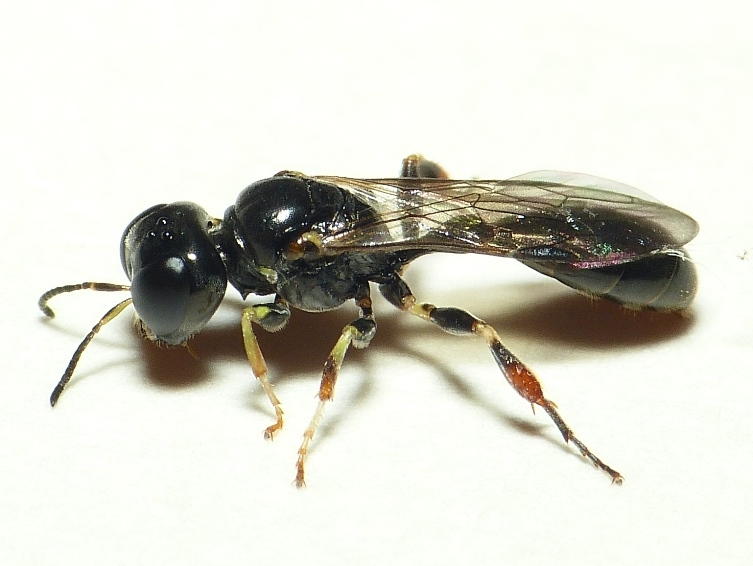
- Rhopalum coarctatum

Scientific classification
- Domain: Eukaryota
- Kingdom: Animalia
- Phylum: Arthropoda
- Class: Insecta
- Order: Hymenoptera
- Family: Crabronidae
- Tribe: Crabronini
- Genus: Rhopalum; Stephens, 1829

Type species
- Rhopalum clavipes (Linnaeus 1758)

Species
- See text

Synonyms
- Euplilis Risso, 1826; Rhopalum Stephens, 1829; Physoscelus Lepeletier de Saint Fargeau and Brullé, 1835; Corynopus Lepeletier de Saint Fargeau and Brullé, 1835; Physoscelis Westwood, 1839; Dryphus Herrich-Schaeffer, 1840; Alliognathus Ashmead, 1899; Calceorhopalum Tsuneki, 1952; Latrorhopalum Tsuneki, 1952; Aporhopalum Leclercq, 1955; Zelorhopalum Leclercq, 1955; Notorhopalum Leclercq, 1979; Crorhopalum Tsuneki, 1984

= Rhopalum =

Genus of wasps

Rhopalum is a genus of wasps in the family Crabronidae.

== Species ==
The genus Rhopalum contains 290 extant species:

- Rhopalum acamas Leclercq, 2002
- Rhopalum adamsi Leclercq, 2011
- Rhopalum amamiinsulanum Terayama and Suda, 2015
- Rhopalum ammaticum Leclercq, 1963
- Rhopalum angulicolle Cameron, 1904
- Rhopalum angustipetiolatum Tsuneki, 1971
- Rhopalum annickae Leclercq, 1997
- Rhopalum ansatum Leclercq, 2002
- Rhopalum anteum Leclercq, 1957
- Rhopalum antennatum Q. Li and He, 1998
- Rhopalum antillarum Leclercq, 1957
- Rhopalum anvillum Leclercq, 1997
- Rhopalum ataiyal Tsuneki, 1982
- Rhopalum atlanticum R. Bohart, 1974
- Rhopalum aucklandi Leclercq, 1955
- Rhopalum australiae Leclercq, 1957
- Rhopalum austriacum (Kohl, 1899)
- Rhopalum avexum Leclercq, 1963
- Rhopalum avocetum Leclercq, 1997
- Rhopalum babe Terayama, Tano, and Kurokawa, 2019
- Rhopalum baguione Tsuneki, 1984
- Rhopalum banosense Leclercq, 2002
- Rhopalum barbatum Leclercq, 1997
- Rhopalum beaumonti Móczár, 1957
- Rhopalum bendorense Leclercq, 1997
- Rhopalum bogotae Leclercq, 2002
- Rhopalum bohartum Tsuneki, 1966
- Rhopalum brachinense Leclercq, 1997
- Rhopalum brevinodum (Spinola, 1851)
- Rhopalum brontense Leclercq, 1997
- Rhopalum bruchi Schrottky, 1909
- Rhopalum bukidnon Tsuneki, 1984
- Rhopalum cajanum Leclercq, 1970
- Rhopalum calderoni Leclercq, 1970
- Rhopalum caldux Leclercq, 2002
- Rhopalum caliense Leclercq, 2002
- Rhopalum calixtoides Leclercq, 1997
- Rhopalum calixtum Leclercq, 1957
- Rhopalum calverti (Pate, 1947)
- Rhopalum calvitinum Leclercq, 2002
- Rhopalum canberrae Leclercq, 1997
- Rhopalum caniae Leclercq, 1997
- Rhopalum canlaoni Leclercq, 1963
- Rhopalum changi Tsuneki, 1968
- Rhopalum cardaleae Leclercq, 1997
- Rhopalum caripenne Leclercq, 2002
- Rhopalum carnegiacum Leclercq, 1979
- Rhopalum carrabinum Leclercq, 1997
- Rhopalum categoricum Leclercq, 2002
- Rhopalum caudinum Leclercq, 2002
- Rhopalum cecropis Leclercq, 2002
- Rhopalum chinchillae Leclercq, 1997
- Rhopalum chinquense Leclercq, 1994
- Rhopalum claudii (Janvier, 1928)
- Rhopalum clavipes (Linnaeus, 1758)
- Rhopalum claviventre (Cresson, 1865)
- Rhopalum clonatum Leclercq, 2002
- Rhopalum coarctatum (Scopoli, 1763)
- Rhopalum cockleum Leclercq, 1997
- Rhopalum collectum Leclercq, 1994
- Rhopalum collessi Leclercq, 1997
- Rhopalum coriolum Leclercq, 1957
- Rhopalum cornicum Tsuneki, 1984
- Rhopalum cornigerum Tsuneki, 1977
- Rhopalum cornilabiatum Q. Li and He, 1999
- Rhopalum crassinodum (Spinola, 1851)
- Rhopalum creutzburgi H.-J. Jacobs, 2016
- Rhopalum cruentatum (Arnold, 1944)
- Rhopalum croisseti Leclercq, 2011
- Rhopalum cumbayae Leclercq, 2002
- Rhopalum curryi Leclercq, 1997
- Rhopalum curtisi Leclercq, 1997
- Rhopalum cygnorum R. Turner, 1915
- Rhopalum decavum Leclercq, 1963
- Rhopalum dedarum Leclercq, 1957
- Rhopalum dellum Leclercq, 1997
- Rhopalum dentiobliquum Q. Li and He, 1998
- Rhopalum deroanni Leclercq, 2002
- Rhopalum dineurum Leclercq, 1957
- Rhopalum diopura (Pate, 1947)
- Rhopalum distractum Leclercq, 1997
- Rhopalum domesticum Williams, 1928
- Rhopalum downiense Leclercq, 1997
- Rhopalum drexum Leclercq, 1997
- Rhopalum duclosi Leclercq, 2002
- Rhopalum durangoense Leclercq, 2002
- Rhopalum duratum Leclercq, 1997
- Rhopalum emolitum Leclercq, 1997
- Rhopalum encabbae Leclercq, 1997
- Rhopalum erraticum Tsuneki, 1965
- Rhopalum etiratum Leclercq, 1997
- Rhopalum eucalypti R. Turner, 1915
- Rhopalum euclanum Leclercq, 1997
- Rhopalum eurytibiale Q. Li and Xue, 1998
- Rhopalum eustonense Leclercq, 1997
- Rhopalum evansianum Leclercq, 1979
- Rhopalum evictum Leclercq, 1979
- Rhopalum evocatum Leclercq, 1997
- Rhopalum ewartense Leclercq, 1997
- Rhopalum expeditionis Leclercq, 1955
- Rhopalum exleyae Leclercq, 1997
- Rhopalum extranum Leclercq, 2002
- Rhopalum exultatum Leclercq, 1970
- Rhopalum eyrense Leclercq, 1997
- Rhopalum facetum Leclercq, 2002
- Rhopalum famicum Leclercq, 1979
- Rhopalum fannum Leclercq, 1997
- Rhopalum farri Leclercq, 2002
- Rhopalum faustum Leclercq, 2002
- Rhopalum federale Leclercq, 2002
- Rhopalum formosanum Tsuneki, 1966
- Rhopalum fraxinum Leclercq, 1997
- Rhopalum frenchii (R. Turner, 1908)
- Rhopalum freturum Leclercq, 1997
- Rhopalum frogatum Leclercq, 1997
- Rhopalum futilum Leclercq, 1997
- Rhopalum gansuense Q. Li and He, 1999
- Rhopalum gauldi Leclercq, 1997
- Rhopalum gloriosum Leclercq, 1997
- Rhopalum gonopleurale Q. Li and Xue, 1998
- Rhopalum gorongozae (Arnold, 1960)
- Rhopalum gracile Wesmael, 1852
- Rhopalum grahami Leclercq, 1957
- Rhopalum gratorineum Leclercq, 1997
- Rhopalum gratuitum Leclercq, 2002
- Rhopalum grenadinum (Pate, 1947)
- Rhopalum guttatum Tsuneki, 1955
- Rhopalum hakodatense Tsuneki, 1960
- Rhopalum hanedai Tsuneki, 1973
- Rhopalum hannense Leclercq, 1997
- Rhopalum hansoni Leclercq, 2002
- Rhopalum harpax Leclercq, 1957
- Rhopalum hawkerense Leclercq, 1997
- Rhopalum hillorum Leclercq, 1963
- Rhopalum hobartense Leclercq, 1997
- Rhopalum hombceanum Tsuneki, 1973
- Rhopalum huberi Leclercq, 2002
- Rhopalum huilae Leclercq, 2002
- Rhopalum ichneumoniforme (Arnold, 1927)
- Rhopalum inopinum Leclercq, 1997
- Rhopalum iridescens R. Turner, 1917
- Rhopalum jamesoni Leclercq, 2002
- Rhopalum jessonicum (Bischoff, 1921)
- Rhopalum juventum Leclercq, 1997
- Rhopalum juxtatum Leclercq, 1997
- Rhopalum kawabatai Marshakov, 1976
- Rhopalum kawense Leclercq, 2002
- Rhopalum kedahense Leclercq, 1957
- Rhopalum kerangi Leclercq, 1957
- Rhopalum kovacsi Leclercq, 1994
- Rhopalum kuehlhorni Leclercq, 1957
- Rhopalum kuwayamai Tsuneki, 1952
- Rhopalum kystum Leclercq, 1997
- Rhopalum laticorne (Tsuneki, 1947)
- Rhopalum latronum (Kohl, 1915)
- Rhopalum littorale R. Turner, 1915
- Rhopalum livanum Leclercq, 1997
- Rhopalum lomae Leclercq, 2002
- Rhopalum macasae Leclercq, 2002
- Rhopalum macrocephalum R. Turner, 1915
- Rhopalum masticatum Leclercq, 1997
- Rhopalum matthewsi Leclercq, 1997
- Rhopalum minusculum Leclercq, 1963
- Rhopalum montanum (Alayo Dalmau, 1968)
- Rhopalum mornense Leclercq, 2002
- Rhopalum moronae Leclercq, 2002
- Rhopalum mouranum Leclercq, 1997
- Rhopalum murotai Tsuneki, 1973
- Rhopalum musallae Leclercq, 2002
- Rhopalum mushaense Tsuneki, 1971
- Rhopalum mycenum Leclercq, 2002
- Rhopalum nactor Leclercq, 2002
- Rhopalum nahuelbutae Leclercq, 1994
- Rhopalum nasale Pulawski, 2010
- Rhopalum naumanni Leclercq, 1997
- Rhopalum navatum Leclercq, 2002
- Rhopalum neboissi Leclercq, 1957
- Rhopalum negligens Leclercq, 2002
- Rhopalum nemesis Leclercq, 2002
- Rhopalum nicaraguaense Cameron, 1904
- Rhopalum nifargum Leclercq, 2002
- Rhopalum nipponicum (Kohl, 1915)
- Rhopalum nordicum Leclercq, 1997
- Rhopalum notogeum Leclercq, 1957
- Rhopalum nuphar Leclercq, 2002
- Rhopalum nursei H.-J. Jacob, 2016
- Rhopalum nynganum Leclercq, 1997
- Rhopalum obrieni Leclercq, 2011
- Rhopalum occidentale (W. Fox, 1895)
- Rhopalum odontodorsale Q. Li and He, 2000
- Rhopalum okinawanum Tsuneki, 1990
- Rhopalum oriolum Leclercq, 1957
- Rhopalum ovale Tsuneki, 1984
- Rhopalum pacificum R. Bohart, 1974
- Rhopalum pallipes (Lepeletier de Saint Fargeau and Brullé, 1835)
- Rhopalum palmarae Leclercq, 2002
- Rhopalum panicum Leclercq, 1997
- Rhopalum parcimonium Leclercq, 1963
- Rhopalum pedicellatum Packard, 1867
- Rhopalum penongum Leclercq, 1997
- Rhopalum pepitum Leclercq, 1997
- Rhopalum perforator F. Smith, 1876
- Rhopalum peterseni Tsuneki, 1976
- Rhopalum pichinchae Leclercq, 2002
- Rhopalum piosense Leclercq, 1997
- Rhopalum pitillae Leclercq, 2002
- Rhopalum plaumanni Leclercq, 1970
- Rhopalum poecilofemorale Q. Li and Xue, 1998
- Rhopalum popayans Leclercq, 2002
- Rhopalum potosium Leclercq, 1970
- Rhopalum praenatum Leclercq, 2002
- Rhopalum probolognathum Leclercq and Menke, 2000
- Rhopalum pygidiale R. Bohart, 1976
- Rhopalum quitense (Benoist, 1942)
- Rhopalum rejectum Leclercq, 2012
- Rhopalum rockyense Leclercq, 1997
- Rhopalum rolotum Leclercq, 1970
- Rhopalum rondeuxi Leclercq, 2002
- Rhopalum rorator Leclercq, 2002
- Rhopalum rossi Leclercq, 2002
- Rhopalum rubigabdominale Q. Li and He, 2000
- Rhopalum rufigaster Packard, 1867
- Rhopalum rumipambae Leclercq, 1970
- Rhopalum runcator Leclercq, 2002
- Rhopalum ruppiatum Leclercq, 2002
- Rhopalum ruptor Leclercq, 2012
- Rhopalum rustulum Leclercq, 2002
- Rhopalum rutans Leclercq, 2002
- Rhopalum rutrax Leclercq, 2002
- Rhopalum rutshuru Leclercq, 2012
- Rhopalum rwankwi Leclercq, 2012
- Rhopalum saccatum Leclercq, 2002
- Rhopalum sandakanum Leclercq, 2011
- Rhopalum sanluisi Leclercq, 2002
- Rhopalum sauteri Tsuneki, 1977
- Rhopalum schaffneri Leclercq, 2002
- Rhopalum schlingeri Leclercq, 2002
- Rhopalum seychellense R. Turner, 1911
- Rhopalum shirozui Tsuneki, 1965
- Rhopalum simalurense (Maidl, 1925)
- Rhopalum sinaloae Leclercq, 2002
- Rhopalum sinus Leclercq, 2002
- Rhopalum smilax Leclercq, 2002
- Rhopalum sobrina Leclercq, 2002
- Rhopalum sonani Tsuneki, 1986
- Rhopalum soroanum (Alayo Dalmau, 1968)
- Rhopalum spinicollum Tsuneki, 1968
- Rhopalum stationis Leclercq, 2002
- Rhopalum stelmanni Leclercq, 1997
- Rhopalum subtaeniatum Leclercq, 1997
- Rhopalum succineicollare Tsuneki, 1952
- Rhopalum sumatrae Leclercq, 1950
- Rhopalum taeniatum Leclercq, 1957
- Rhopalum taipingshanum Tsuneki, 1968
- Rhopalum tayalum Tsuneki, 1966
- Rhopalum tegulatum Leclercq, 1997
- Rhopalum tenuiventre (R. Turner, 1908)
- Rhopalum tepicum Leclercq, 1957
- Rhopalum terzoi Leclercq, 2002
- Rhopalum testaceum R. Turner, 1917
- Rhopalum tingonum Leclercq, 2002
- Rhopalum tongyaii Tsuneki, 1963
- Rhopalum transiens (R. Turner, 1908)
- Rhopalum tristani (Pate, 1947)
- Rhopalum tsunekiense Leclercq, 1957
- Rhopalum tsunekii Terayama and Murota, 2016
- Rhopalum tubarum Leclercq, 1957
- Rhopalum tuberculicorne R. Turner, 1917
- Rhopalum tungurae Leclercq, 2002
- Rhopalum urallae Leclercq, 1997
- Rhopalum vallense Leclercq, 2002
- Rhopalum varicoloratum Q. Li and He, 1998
- Rhopalum variitarse R. Turner, 1915
- Rhopalum venustum Tsuneki, 1955
- Rhopalum verutum (Rayment, 1932)
- Rhopalum vicosae Leclercq, 2002
- Rhopalum vincenti Leclercq, 2002
- Rhopalum volcani Leclercq, 2002
- Rhopalum watanabei Tsuneki, 1952
- Rhopalum weipanum Leclercq, 1997
- Rhopalum wileyi Leclercq, 2002
- Rhopalum wonvillei Leclercq, 1997
- Rhopalum wusheense Tsuneki, 1973
- Rhopalum xenum Leclercq, 1957
- Rhopalum xinjangense Q. Li and Xue, 1998
- Rhopalum yallingupae Leclercq, 1997
- Rhopalum yercaudi Leclercq, 1963
- Rhopalum zamorae Leclercq, 2002
- Rhopalum zethus Leclercq, 2002
- Rhopalum zelandum Leclercq, 1955
