= Crossocerus varus =

Scientific classification
- Domain: Eukaryota
- Kingdom: Animalia
- Phylum: Arthropoda
- Class: Insecta
- Order: Hymenoptera
- Family: Crabronidae
- Subfamily: Crabroninae
- Tribe: Crabronini
- Genus: Crossocerus
- Species: C. varus

Binomial name
- Crossocerus varus Lepeletier & Brullé, 1835

Species of wasp

Crossocerus varus is a Palearctic species of solitary wasp.
