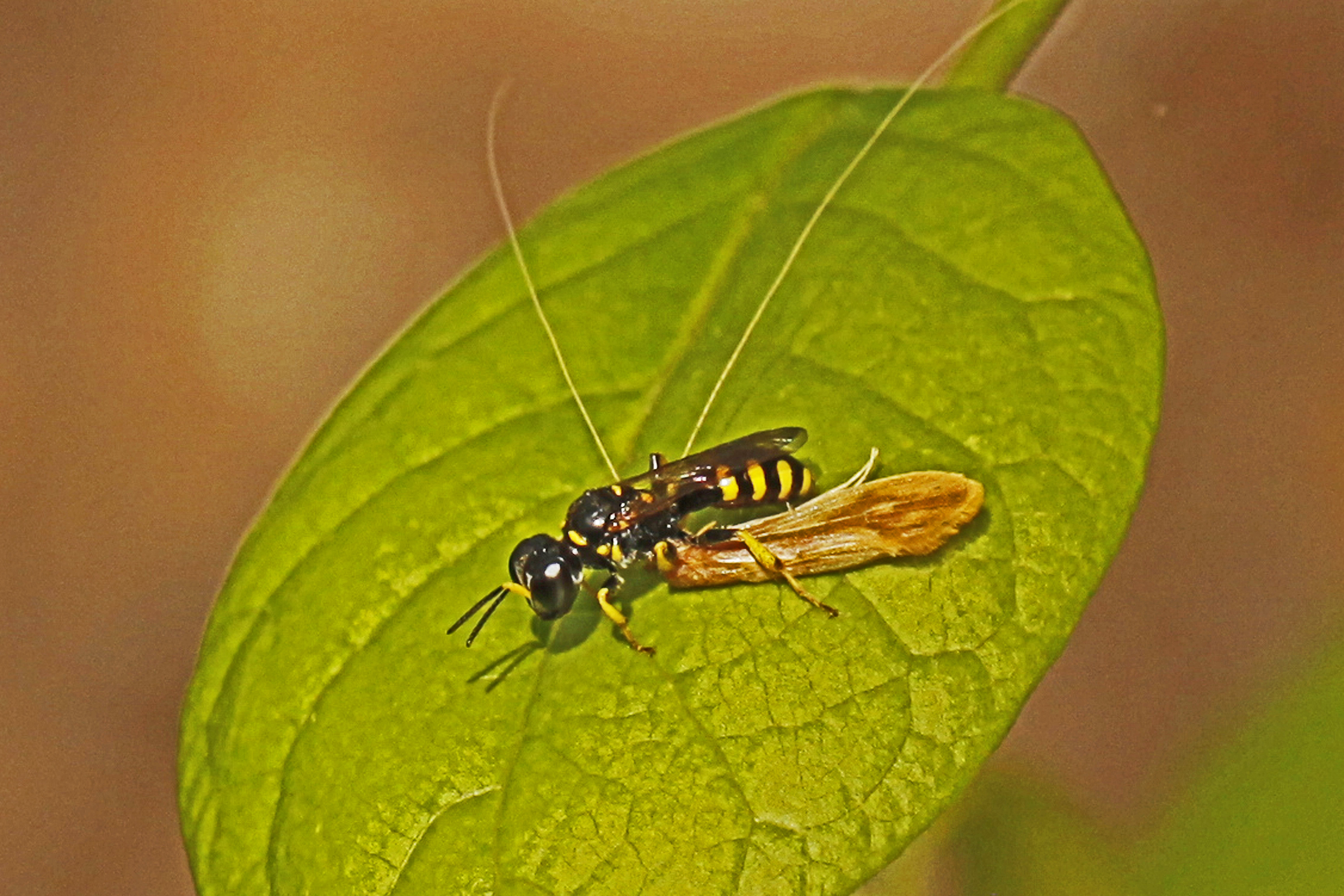

Scientific classification
- Domain: Eukaryota
- Kingdom: Animalia
- Phylum: Arthropoda
- Class: Insecta
- Order: Hymenoptera
- Family: Crabronidae
- Tribe: Crabronini
- Genus: Crossocerus
- Species: C. nitidiventris

Binomial name
- Crossocerus nitidiventris (W. Fox, 1892)

Synonyms
- Crabro nitidiventris W. Fox, 1892

= Crossocerus nitidiventris =

Species of wasp

Crossocerus nitidiventris is a species of square-headed wasp in the family Crabronidae. It is found in North America.
