= Rhopalum perforator =

Scientific classification
- Kingdom: Animalia
- Phylum: Arthropoda
- Clade: Pancrustacea
- Class: Insecta
- Order: Hymenoptera
- Family: Crabronidae
- Genus: Rhopalum
- Species: R. perforator

Binomial name
- Rhopalum perforator Smith, 1876

Synonyms

Species of wasp

Rhopalum perforator is a wasp species in the family Crabronidae. It is endemic to New Zealand.
