= Bothynostethini =

Scientific classification
- Domain: Eukaryota
- Kingdom: Animalia
- Phylum: Arthropoda
- Class: Insecta
- Order: Hymenoptera
- Family: Crabronidae
- Subfamily: Crabroninae
- Tribe: Bothynostethini

Genera
- Bohartella Menke, 1968; Bothynostethus Kohl, 1894; Sanaviron Vardy, 1987; Scapheutes Handlirsch, 1887; Willinkiella Menke, 1968

Tribe of wasps

Bothynostethini is a small neotropical tribe of solitary wasps partly recognizable for having peculiar modifications at the apex of the hind femora.
