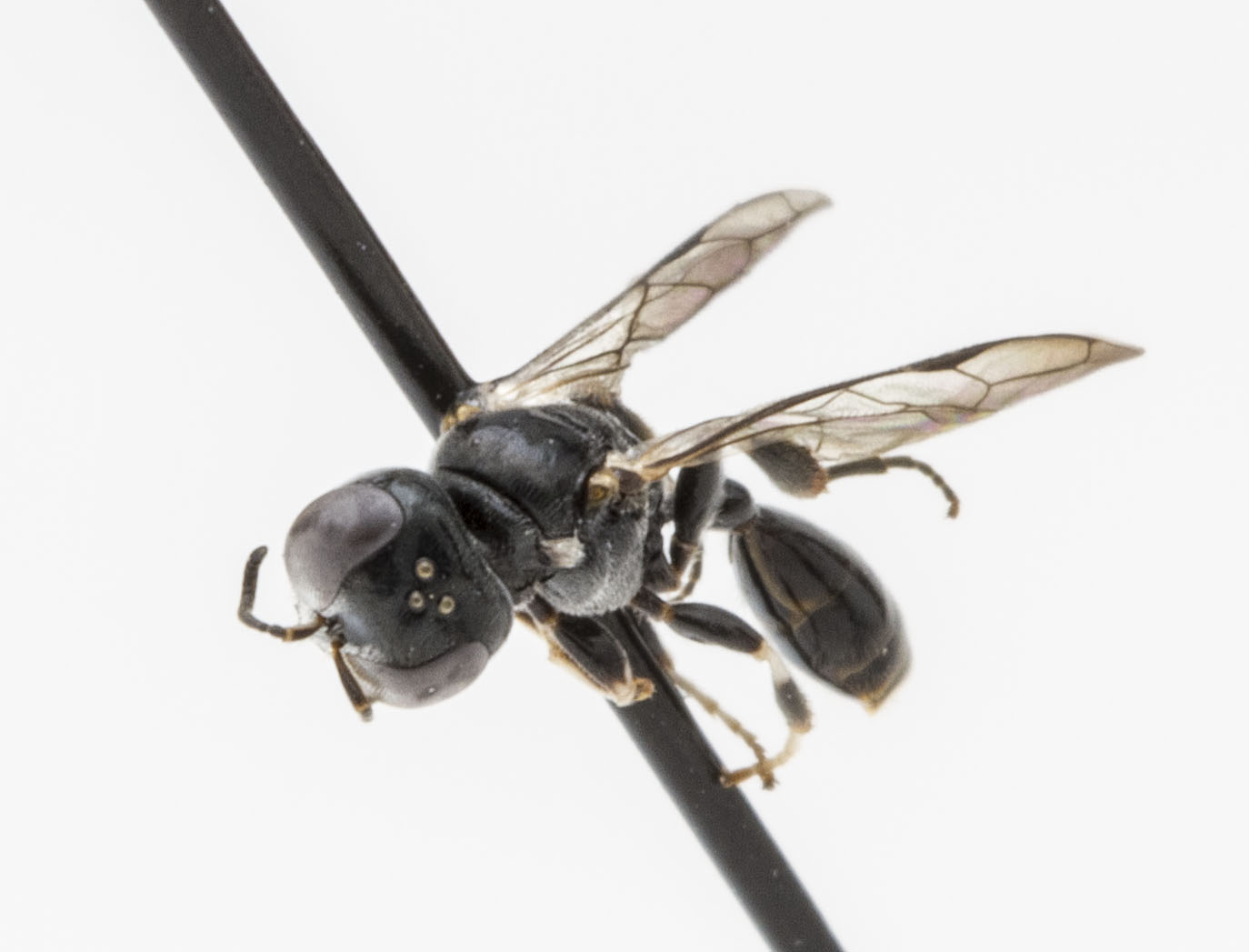

Scientific classification
- Kingdom: Animalia
- Phylum: Arthropoda
- Class: Insecta
- Order: Hymenoptera
- Family: Crabronidae
- Genus: Rhopalum
- Species: R. clavipes

Binomial name
- Rhopalum clavipes (Linnaeus, 1758)

Synonyms
- Crabro rufiventris Linnaeus, 1758; Pemphredon rufiventris Panzer, 1799; Physoscelus rufiventris (Panzer, 1799); Rhopalum rufiventre (Panzer, 1799); Sphex clavipes (Panzer, 1799)

= Rhopalum clavipes =

Species of wasp

Rhopalum clavipes is a species of square-headed wasp in the family Crabronidae. It is found in Europe, Northern Asia (excluding China) and North America.
