= Teskeyellus cyanommatus =

Scientific classification
- Domain: Eukaryota
- Kingdom: Animalia
- Phylum: Arthropoda
- Class: Insecta
- Order: Diptera
- Family: Tabanidae
- Genus: Teskeyellus
- Species: T. cyanommatus

Binomial name
- Teskeyellus cyanommatus Henriques & Carmo, 2017

Species of fly

Teskeyellus cyanommatus is a species of horsefly in the family Tabanidae discovered in Manaus, Brazil in 2017.

== Description ==
The fly's abdomen and thorax are completely covered in bright yellow and black striped fur, imitative of a sand wasp, and females are thought to not require blood meals to reproduce, unlike most tabanids. Little is known so far about its ecology and habitat, but it likely has a wider range in the Amazon Basin.
