= Crossocerus styrius =

Scientific classification
- Kingdom: Animalia
- Phylum: Arthropoda
- Clade: Pancrustacea
- Class: Insecta
- Order: Hymenoptera
- Family: Crabronidae
- Subfamily: Crabroninae
- Tribe: Crabronini
- Genus: Crossocerus
- Species: C. styrius

Binomial name
- Crossocerus styrius (Kohl, 1892)

Species of wasp

Crossocerus styrius is a Palearctic species of solitary wasp.
