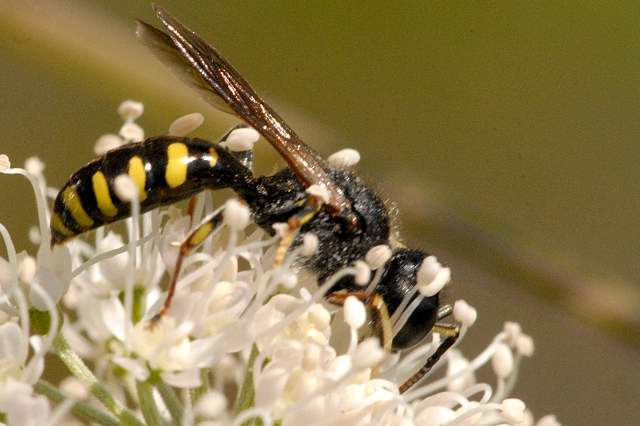

Scientific classification
- Domain: Eukaryota
- Kingdom: Animalia
- Phylum: Arthropoda
- Class: Insecta
- Order: Hymenoptera
- Family: Crabronidae
- Genus: Ectemnius
- Species: E. lapidarius

Binomial name
- Ectemnius lapidarius (Panzer, 1803)

Synonyms
- Clytochrysus chrysostomus Panzer, 1803; Clytochrysus gracilissimus Fabricius, 1804; Clytochrysus obscurus Lepeletier de Saint Fargeau and Brullé, 1835; Crabro chrysostomus (Lepeletier de Saint Fargeau and Brullé, 1835); Crabro comptus (Lepeletier de Saint Fargeau and Brullé, 1835); Crabro denticulatus Lepeletier de Saint Fargeau and Brullé, 1835; Crabro effossus Shuckard, 1837; Crabro gracilissimus F. Smith, 1851; Crabro interstinctus F. Smith, 1856; Crabro lapidarius (F. Smith, 1856); Crabro obscurus (F. Smith, 1856); Crabro papagorum Packard, 1866; Crabro sinuatus (Packard, 1866); Crabro xylurgus Packard, 1866; Ectemnius chrysostomus Packard, 1866; Solenius obscurus Viereck, 1908

= Ectemnius lapidarius =

Species of wasp

Ectemnius lapidarius is a species of square-headed wasp in the family Crabronidae. It is found in Africa, Europe and Northern Asia (excluding China), North America, and Southern Asia.

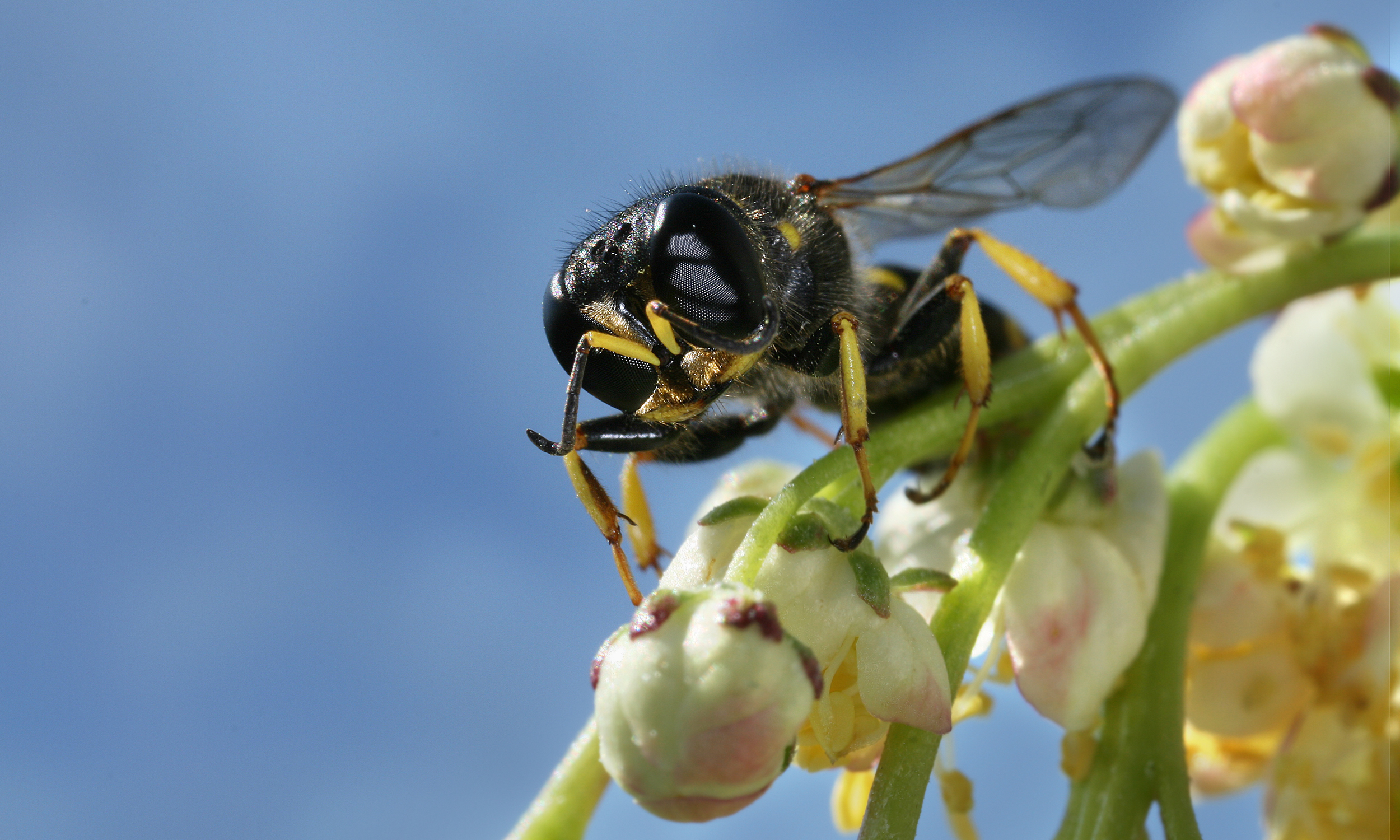
