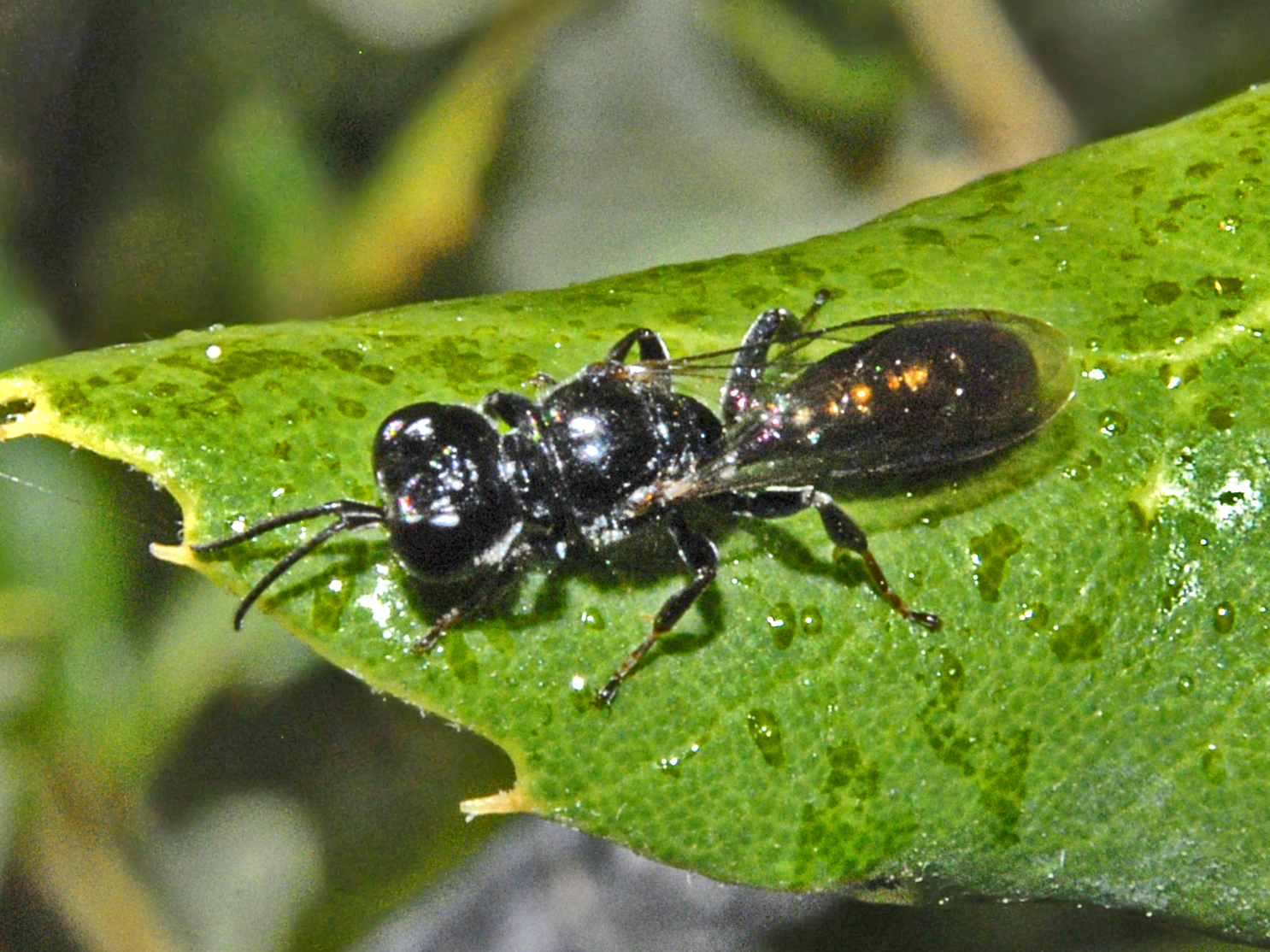
- Crossocerus species

Scientific classification
- Domain: Eukaryota
- Kingdom: Animalia
- Phylum: Arthropoda
- Class: Insecta
- Order: Hymenoptera
- Family: Crabronidae
- Tribe: Crabronini
- Genus: Crossocerus; Lepeletier & Brullé, 1834

Type species
- Crossocerus palmipes (Linnaeus 1767)

Diversity
- at least 250 species

= Crossocerus =

Genus of insects

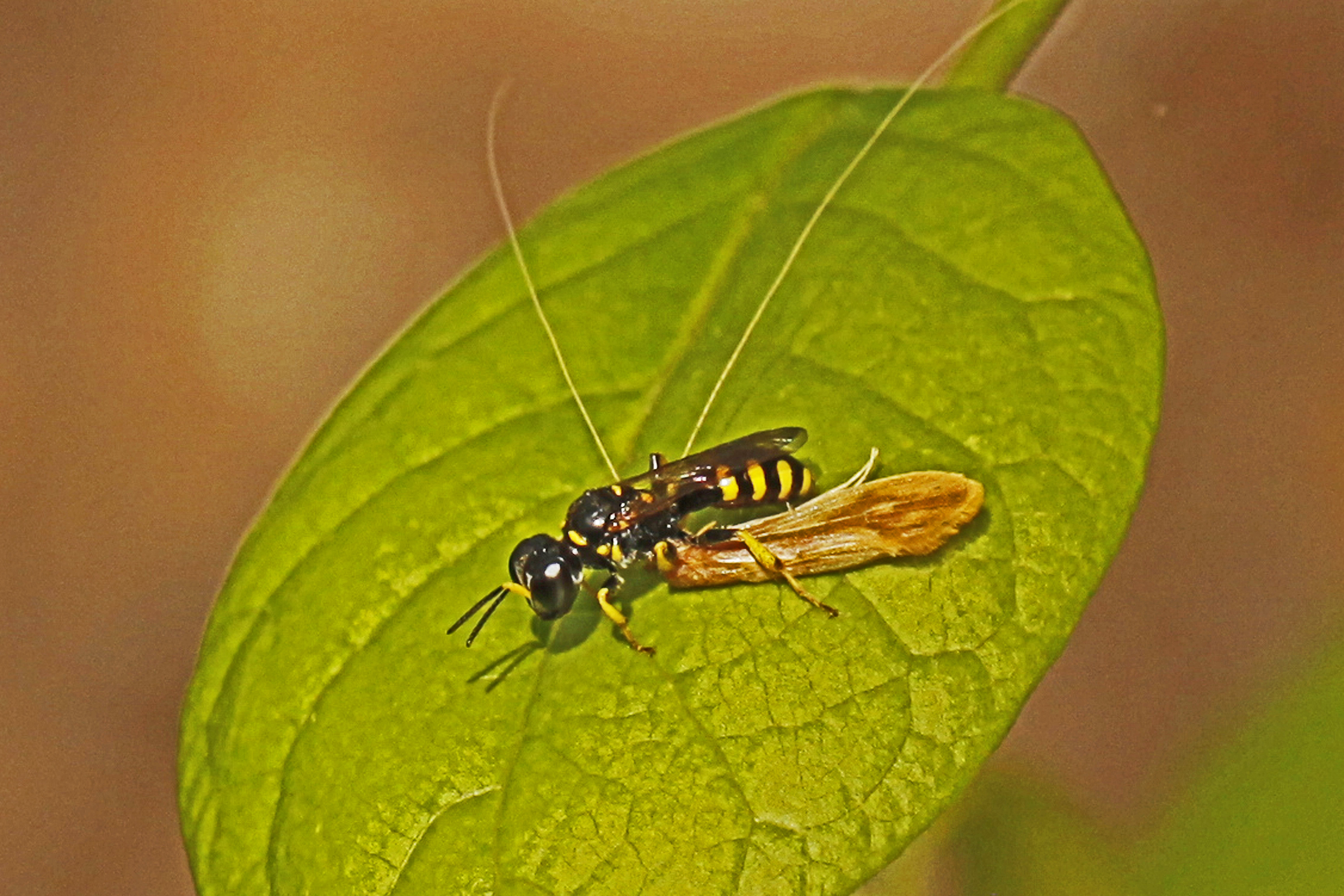
Crossocerus nitidiventris

Crossocerus is a genus of square-headed wasps in the family Crabronidae. There are at least 250 described species in Crossocerus.

== European species ==
Species within this genus include:

- Crossocerus acanthophorus (Kohl 1892)
- Crossocerus adhaesus (Kohl 1915)
- Crossocerus annulipes (Lepeletier & Brulle 1835)
- Crossocerus assimilis (F. Smith 1856)
- Crossocerus barbipes (Dahlbom 1845)
- Crossocerus binotatus Lepeletier & Brulle 1835
- Crossocerus capitosus (Shuckard 1837)
- Crossocerus cetratus (Shuckard 1837)
- Crossocerus cinxius (Dahlbom 1838)
- Crossocerus congener (Dahlbom 1844)
- Crossocerus denticoxa (Bischoff 1932)
- Crossocerus denticrus Herrich-Schaeffer 1841
- Crossocerus dimidiatus (Fabricius 1781)
- Crossocerus distinguendus (A. Morawitz 1866)
- Crossocerus elongatulus (Vander Linden 1829)
- Crossocerus exiguus (Vander Linden 1829)
- Crossocerus guichardi Leclercq 1972
- Crossocerus heydeni Kohl 1880
- Crossocerus italicus Beaumont 1959
- Crossocerus leucostoma (Linnaeus 1758)
- Crossocerus lindbergi (Beaumont 1954)
- Crossocerus lundbladi (Kjellander 1954)
- Crossocerus megacephalus (Rossi 1790)
- Crossocerus nigrita (Lepeletier & Brulle 1835)
- Crossocerus ovalis Lepeletier & Brulle 1835
- Crossocerus palmipes (Linnaeus 1767)
- Crossocerus podagricus (Vander Linden 1829)
- Crossocerus pullulus (A. Morawitz 1866)
- Crossocerus quadrimaculatus (Fabricius 1793)
- Crossocerus styrius (Kohl 1892)
- Crossocerus subulatus (Dahlbom 1845)
- Crossocerus tarsatus (Shuckard 1837)
- Crossocerus toledensis Leclercq 1971
- Crossocerus vagabundus (Panzer 1798)
- Crossocerus varus Lepeletier & Brulle 1835
- Crossocerus walkeri (Shuckard 1837)
- Crossocerus wesmaeli (Vander Linden 1829)

== See also ==
- List of Crossocerus species
