= William Edward Shuckard =

William Edward Shuckard (1803, Brighton – 10 November 1868, Kennington) was an English bookseller and entomologist. He was also librarian of the Royal Society and translated Manual of Entomology Hermann Burmeister (1807-1892). He was a specialist in Hymenoptera but worked on Coleoptera in his early years.

== Publications ==
The British Coleoptera delineated, consisting of figures of all the genera of British beetles (1840)

Partial list

- A Description of the Superior Wings of the Hymenoptera. Trans. Ent. Soc., London, Vol. I., p. 208, 1836.
- Essay on the indigenous fossorial Hymenoptera : comprising a description of all the British species of burrowing sand wasps contained in the metropolitan collections, with their habits as far as they have been observed 1837
- Elements of British Entomology. London, 1839.
- with Spry, W. The British Coleoptera Delineated 1840.
- Monograph of the Dorylidae, a family of these Hymenoptera Heterogyna. Ann. Mag. Nat. Hist. (1)5: 258-271 (1840).
- British Bees. An Introduction to the Study of the Natural History and Economy of the Bees Indigenous to the British Isles (1866)

Shuckard described many of the Hymenoptera collected by Charles Darwin on the Voyage of the Beagle.

He was a Fellow of the Entomological Society of London
