= Pierre Léonard Vander Linden =

Belgian entomologist

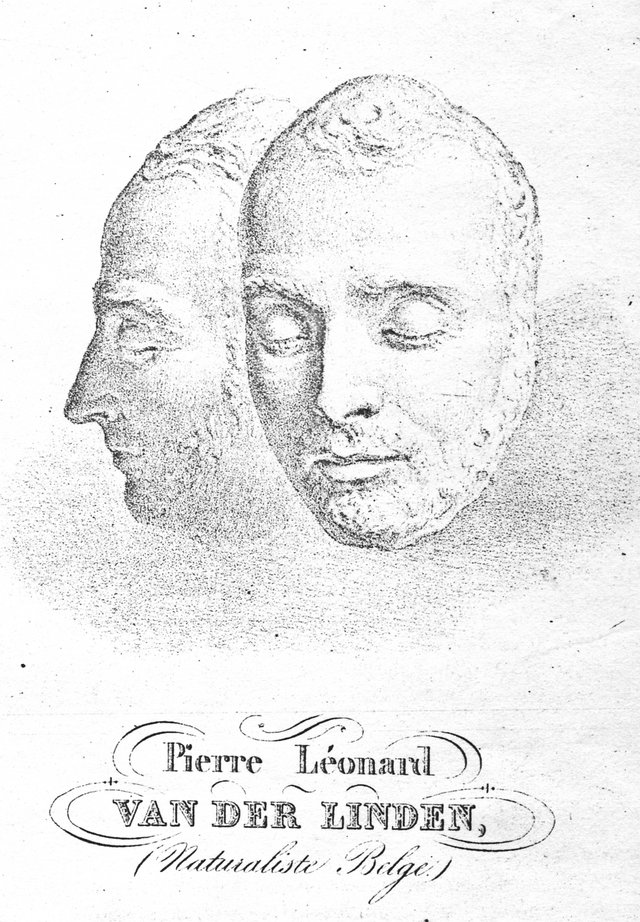
Death mask drawing

Pierre Léonard Vander Linden (12 December 1797 – 5 April 1831) was a Belgian entomologist born in Brussels. In Italy, he studied under the botanist Antonio Bertoloni (1775–1869), the zoologist Camillo Ranzani (1775–1841) and the physician Giacomo Tommasini (1768–1846). During his studies, he worked on Odonata. In 1826 he was appointed as the first professor of zoology, at the Musée des Sciences et Lettres in Brussels.

== Works ==
- Monographiae Libellulinarum Europearum specimen (Vander Linden 1825)
- Observations sur les Hyménoptères d’Europe de la famille des Fouisseurs (1829).
- P.L. Vander Linden (1829) Essai sur les insects de Java et des îles voisines. Nouveaux mémoires de l'Académie Royale des Sciences et Belles-Lettres de Bruxelles, Volume 5, page 1-28
