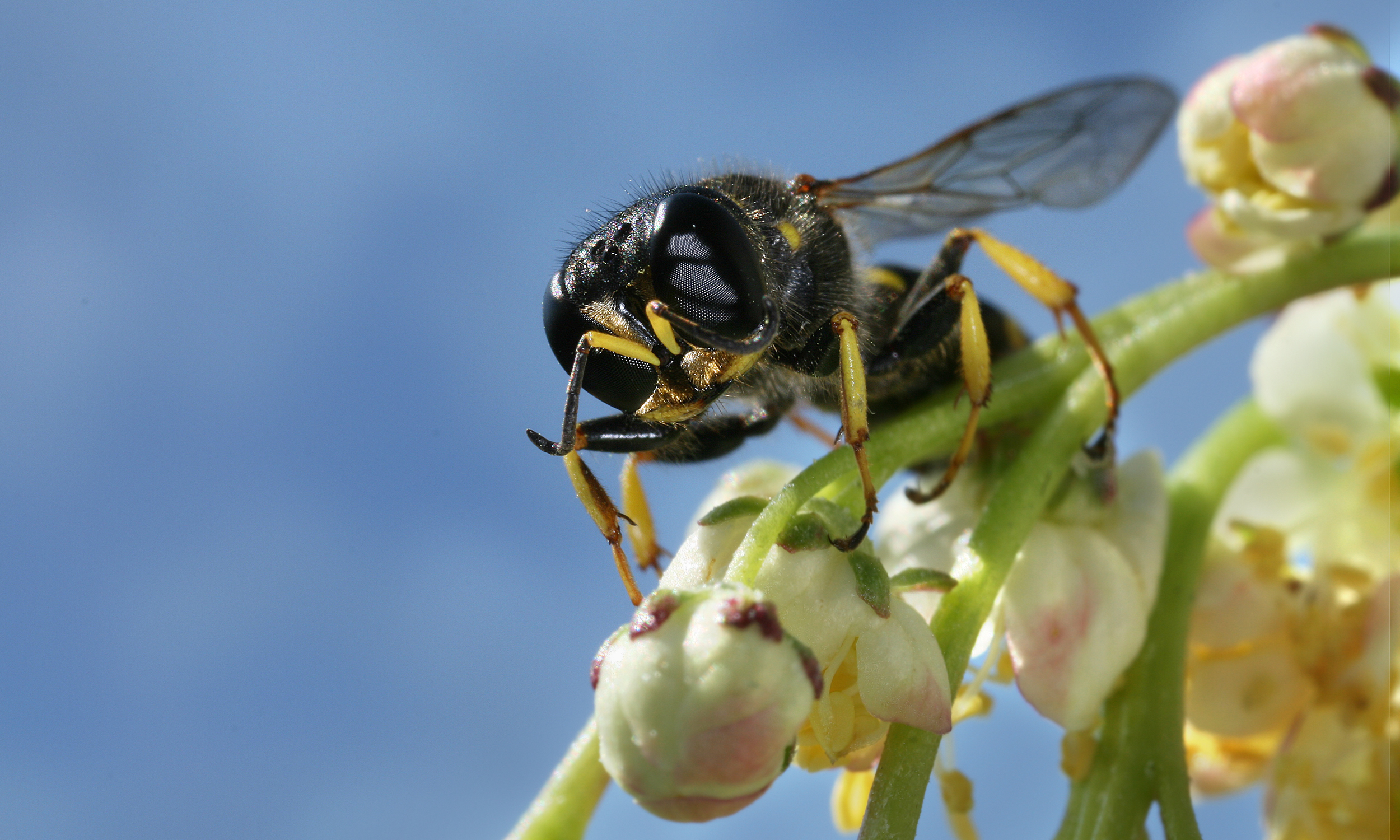
- Ectemnius lapidarius

Scientific classification
- Kingdom: Animalia
- Phylum: Arthropoda
- Clade: Pancrustacea
- Class: Insecta
- Order: Hymenoptera
- Family: Crabronidae
- Subfamily: Crabroninae

Tribes
- Bothynostethini W. Fox, 1894; Crabronini Latreille, 1802; Larrini Latreille, 1810; Miscophini W. Fox, 1894; Oxybelini Leach, 1815; Palarini Schrottky, 1909; Trypoxylini Lepeletier de Saint Fargeau, 1845; † Discoscapini Poinar, 2020; † Protomicroidini Antropov, 2010

= Crabroninae =

Subfamily of wasps

The subfamily Crabroninae is the most diverse group in the wasp family Crabronidae, containing over 110 genera and 4,800 described species. The subfamily consists of solitary, predatory wasps. The adult females of many groups dig tunnels in the ground for nesting, but others use different techniques, including the construction of tube-like mud nests (e.g., Trypoxylon politum).

As with all other sphecoid wasps, the larvae are carnivorous; females hunt for prey on which to lay their eggs, supplying the larvae with paralyzed, living prey when they emerge.

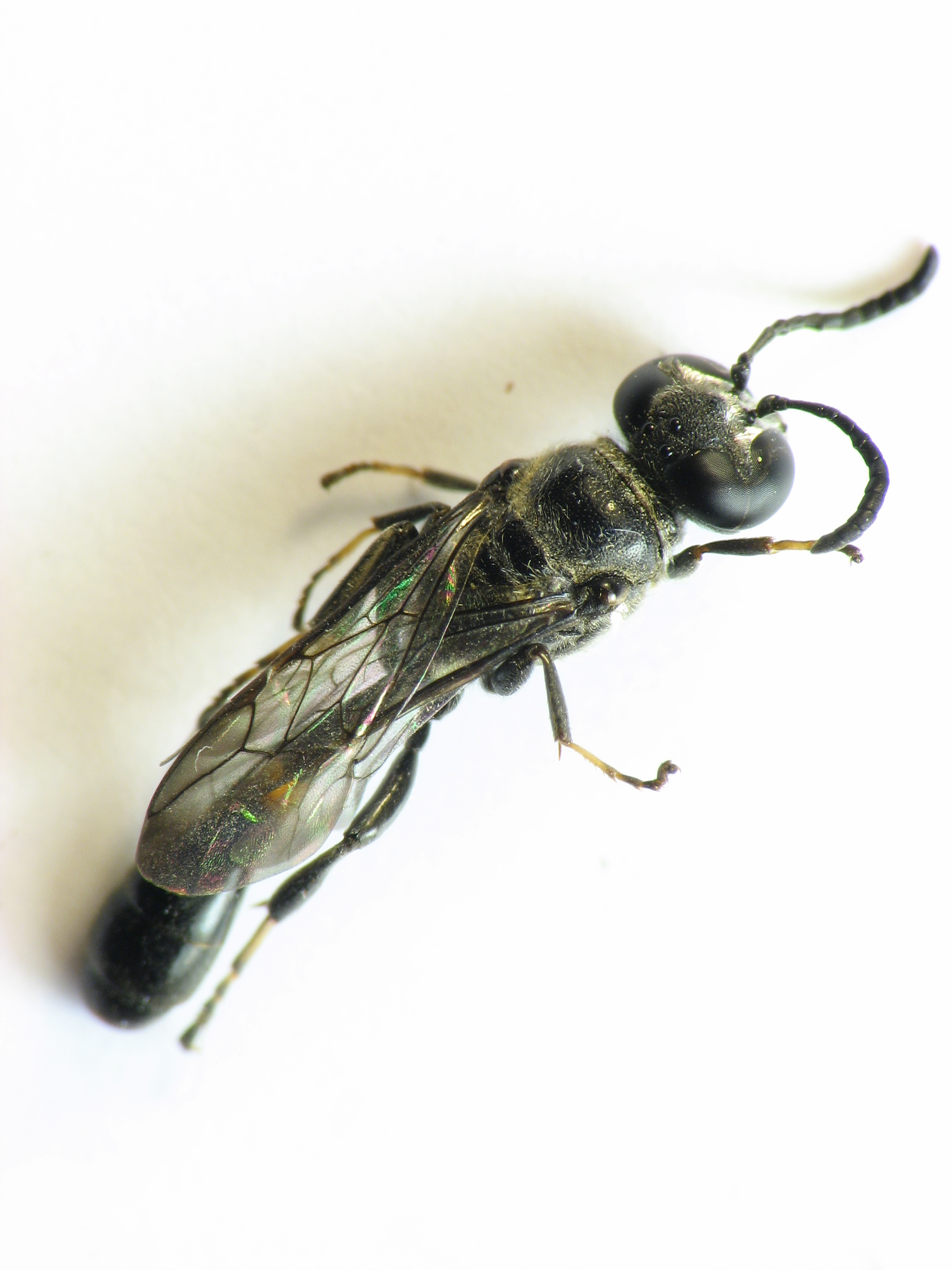
Trypoxylon collinum
