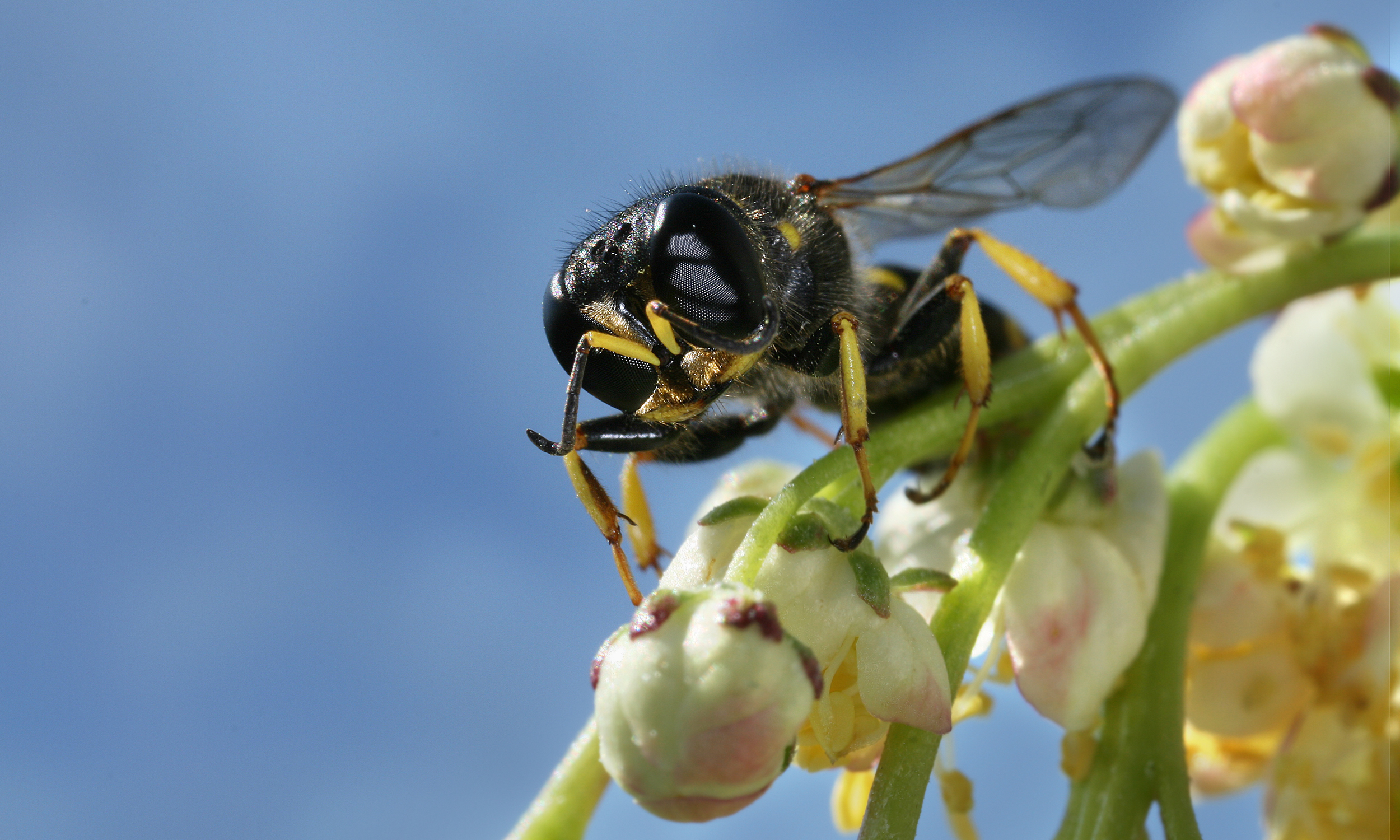
- Ectemnius lapidarius

Scientific classification
- Kingdom: Animalia
- Phylum: Arthropoda
- Class: Insecta
- Order: Hymenoptera
- Family: Crabronidae
- Subfamily: Crabroninae
- Tribe: Crabronini; Latreille, 1802

Subtribes
- Anacrabronina; Crabronina

= Crabronini =

Tribe of wasps

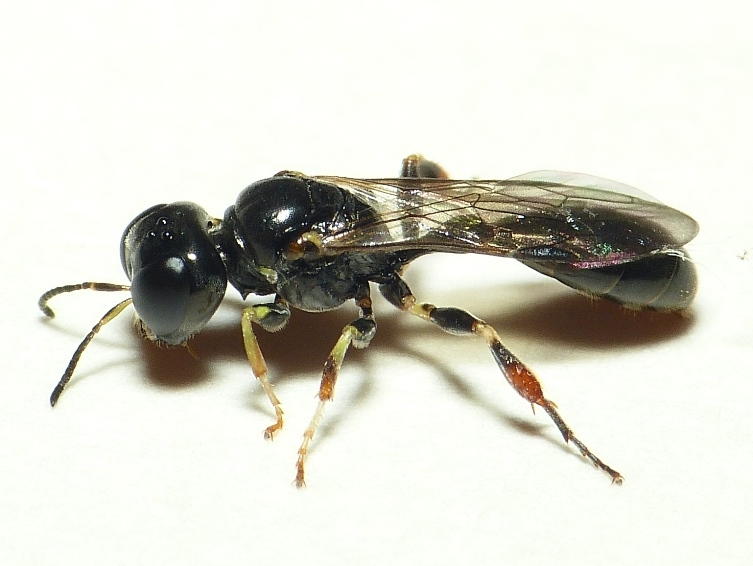
Rhopalum coarctatum

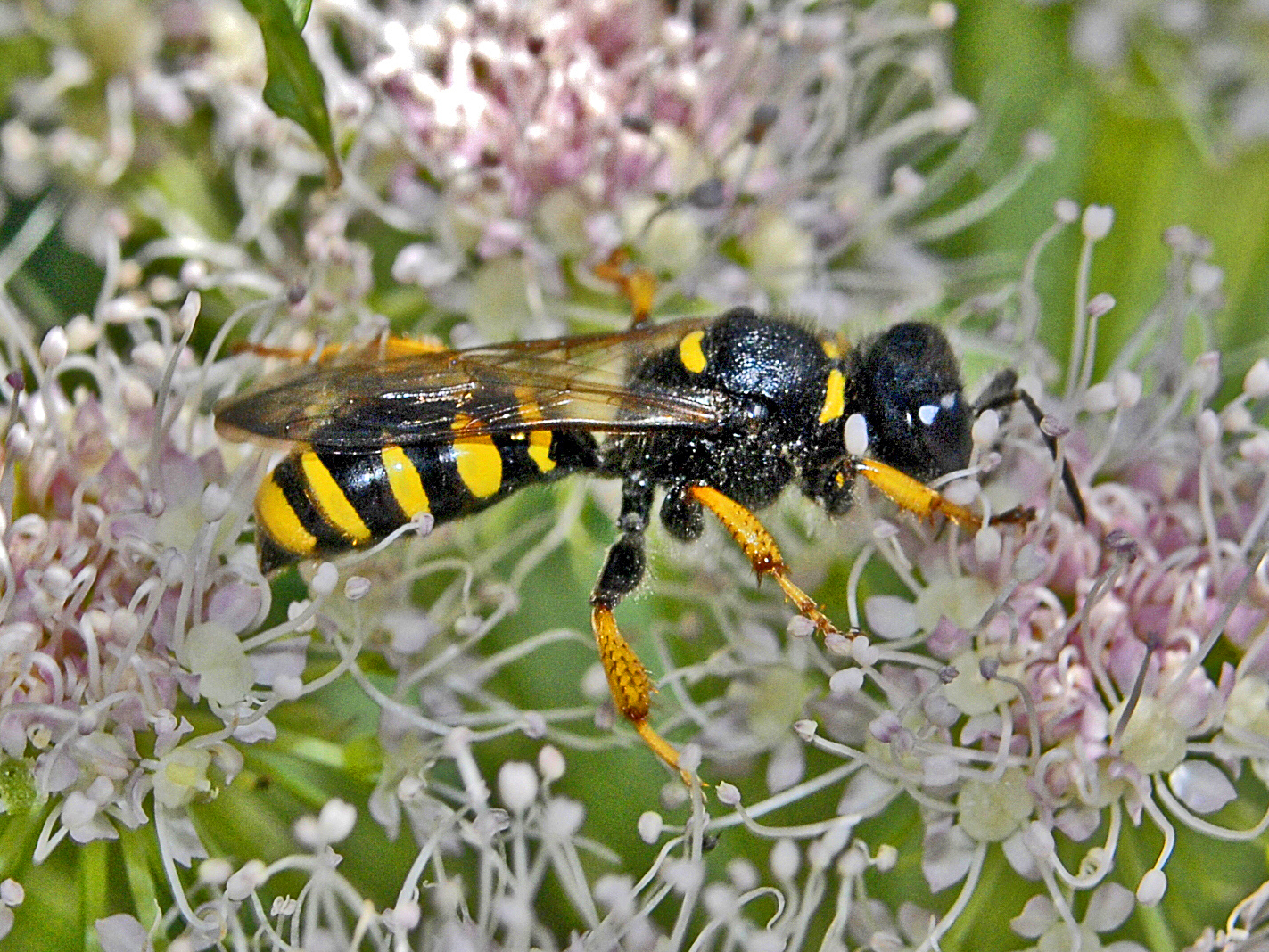
Crabro cribrarius

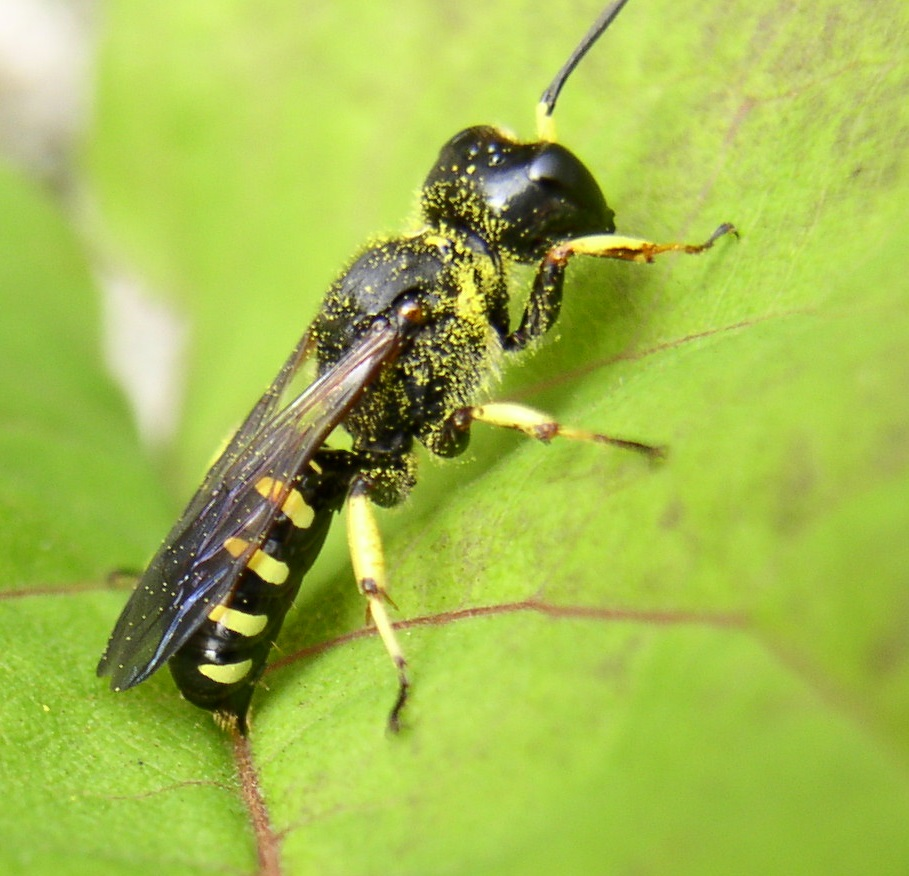
Ectemnius maculosus with pollen

Crabronini is a tribe of square-headed wasps in the family Crabronidae. There are 48 genera and over 1,500 described species in Crabronini. Wasps of this tribe are mostly small to very small wasps. Typical of this tribe are the forewings with a single submarginal cell, the lack of membranous metanotal and propodeal modifications, and (in most genera) a square-shaped head.

Typical Crabronini prey upon flies and make simple nests, either in the ground or in rotting logs.
