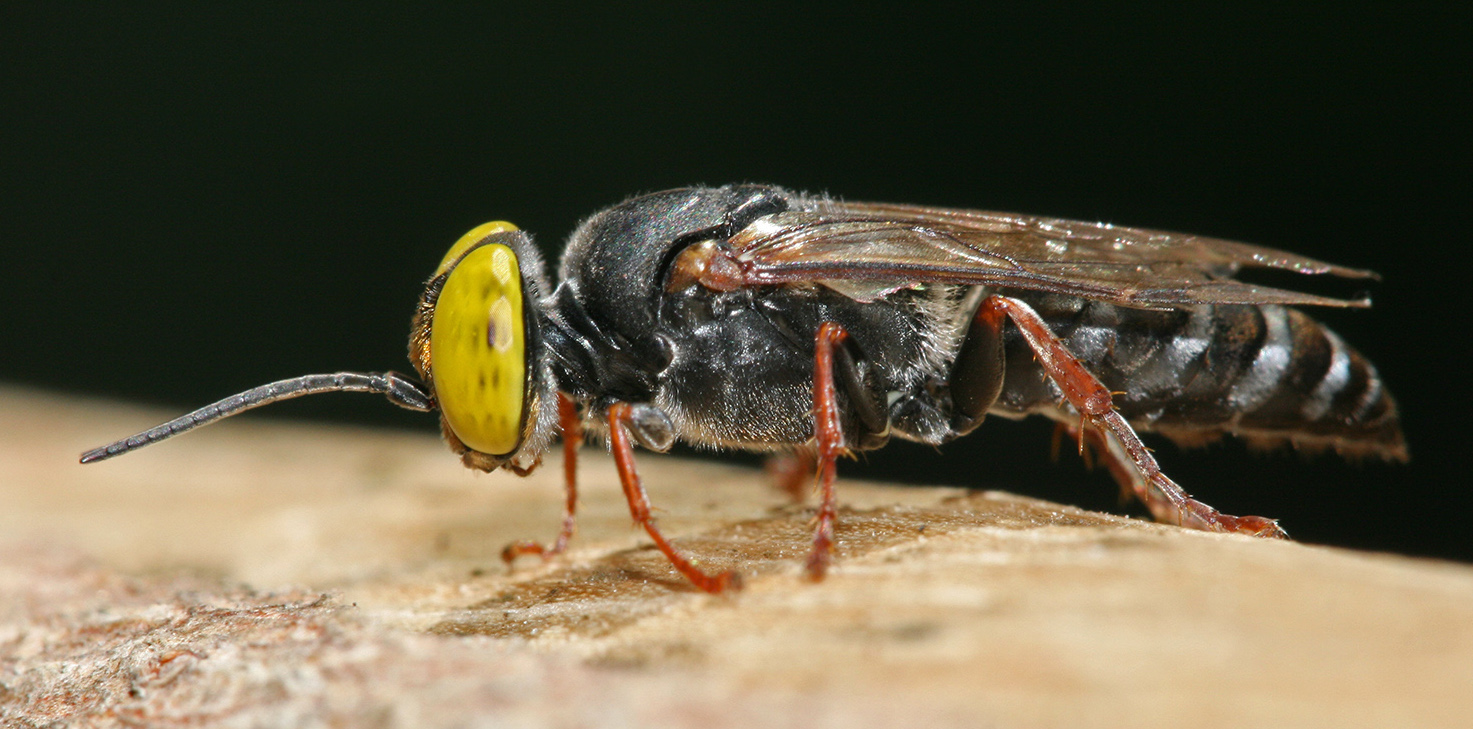
- Tachysphex sp.

Scientific classification
- Kingdom: Animalia
- Phylum: Arthropoda
- Class: Insecta
- Order: Hymenoptera
- Superfamily: Apoidea
- Family: Crabronidae; Latreille, 1802

Subfamilies
- Crabroninae; Dinetinae

= Crabronidae =

Family of wasps

Crabronidae is a large family of wasps within the superfamily Apoidea.

== Taxonomy and phylogeny ==
This family has historically been treated as a subfamily in the now-defunct Spheciformes group under the family Sphecidae. The Spheciformes included well over 200 genera, containing well over 9000 species. Revision of these taxa resulted in the restriction of the Sphecidae to what was once the subfamily Sphecinae. As a result, the former Crabroninae was elevated to family status as Crabronidae. Subsequent revision has further restricted the Crabronidae. Several of the subfamilies of the Crabronidae are often treated as families in their own right, as is true of the most recent phylogenies. Of these lineages of Apoidea, only three were not included within Crabronidae in the past: Ampulicidae, Sphecidae, and Anthophila.

The following phylogenetic tree is based on Sann et al., 2018, which used phylogenomics to demonstrate that both the bees (Anthophila) and the Sphecidae arose from within the former Crabronidae, which is therefore paraphyletic, and which they suggested should be split into several families; the former family Heterogynaidae nests within the Bembicidae, as here defined. These findings differ in several details from studies published by two other sets of authors in 2017, though all three studies demonstrate a paraphyletic "Crabronidae" and the need to establish additional families.

- Apoidea
  - Ampulicidae
  - - Astatidae
    - - - Bembicidae
        - - Sphecidae (sensu stricto)
          - - - Crabronidae (sensu stricto)
              - Mellinidae
      - - - Pemphredonidae
          - Philanthidae
        - - Psenidae
          - - - Ammoplanidae
              - Anthophila (bees)

Further analysis by Sann et al. in 2021 resulted in the former Entomosericini (from Pemphredoninae) and Eremiaspheciinae being elevated to family status as Entomosericidae and Eremiaspheciidae, respectively. The true phylogentic placements for both small families remain unresolved but outside of either Pemphredonidae, Psenidae, and the lineage comprising Ammoplanidae and bees.

== Sources ==
- Catalog of Sphecidae sensu lato at Cal Academy
