= Celatoblatta peninsularis =

Scientific classification
- Kingdom: Animalia
- Phylum: Arthropoda
- Class: Insecta
- Order: Blattodea
- Family: Blattidae
- Genus: Celatoblatta
- Species: C. peninsularis

Binomial name
- Celatoblatta peninsularis Johns, 1966

Species of cockroach

Celatoblatta peninsularis is a species of cockroach endemic to New Zealand, where it is only known from Banks Peninsula in the Canterbury region. It was described in 1966 by Peter Johns and is most closely related to Celatoblatta brunni. The adults are around 12.5-15mm (0.49-0.59 in) in length and can be found in a variety of habitats on the peninsula. The species occurs all year round and are thought to produce brood in two pulses per year. They are also known to be parasitized by Tachysphex nigerrimus, the black cockroach hunter.

== Taxonomy ==
This species was described in 1966 by Peter Johns from specimens collected throughout Banks Peninsula. The holotype is stored in Canterbury Museum.

Phylogeny

- - - - - Celatoblatta montana
        - Celatoblatta laevispinata
      - Celatoblatta hesperia
    - - Celatoblatta anisoptera
      - Celatoblatta quinquemaculata
  - - - - - Celatoblatta montana x vulgaris
          - Celatoblatta vulgaris
        - Celatoblatta montana
      - Celatoblatta pallidicauda
    - - Celatoblatta brunni
      - Celatoblatta peninsularis
- Celatoblatta vulgaris

=== Phylogeny ===
A 2004 study examined the relationships New Zealand's Celatoblatta using ten of its species, including Celatoblatta peninsularis. Using cytochrome oxidase I sequences, the study found that C. peninsularis was most closely related to Celatoblatta brunni, a species from the Chatham Islands and support for the group was also found in 2011. It was also estimated that the two species diverged from each other around one million years ago.

== Description ==
As adults, the cockroaches are around 12.5-15mm (0.49-0.59 in) in length. The colour pattern is very similar to that of Celatoblatta vulgaris (the most widespread species of the genus), but the abdomen pale dots are absent or poorly defined. The second and third tarsi of each leg has one spine on each side of the pulvilli pads. In males, the first abdomen pit has a ridge and depression just below it. The bases of the cerci are darkly coloured. The females suranal plate is darkly colour anterior, pale brown medially and yellow brown everywhere else. The shape of the plate is similar to that in C. vulgaris.

== Distribution and habitat ==
Celatoblatta peninsularis is endemic to New Zealand. They only occur on Banks Peninsula in the Canterbury region of the South Island. They occur in a variety of habitats such as forest, tussock and scrub. This cockroach is often found under the bark of tree fuchsia with another endemic cockroach, Parellipsidon pachycercum.

== Life history ==
Although the cockroach are present all year round, they are most abundant from early autumn to winter, and in late summer. They lay their ootheca (eggs) all year round. Each ootheca contain 10-12 nymphs. Based on measurements of the nymphs throughout their development, it has been inferred that there are probably seven instars. It has also been suggested that the adults are bivoltine, producing broods in two pulses per year.

== Parasites ==
This species is known to be parasitized by Protrellus dalei, a species of nematode which is widespread throughout New Zealand and also infects other species of Celatoblatta. They are also known to be targeted by Tachysphex nigerrimus, the black cockroach hunter.
