= List of Tachysphex species =

This is a list of species in Tachysphex, a genus of square-headed wasps in the family Crabronidae.

== Tachysphex species ==
- Tachysphex aborigenus Pulawski, 1977^{i c g}
- Tachysphex aburi Pulawski, 2007^{i c g}
- Tachysphex acanthophorus Pulawski, 1982^{i c g}
- Tachysphex actites Pulawski in Krombein and Pulawski, 1994^{i c g}
- Tachysphex acutemarginatus Strand, 1910^{i c g}
- Tachysphex acutus (Patton, 1880)^{i c g}
- Tachysphex adjunctus Kohl, 1885^{i c g}
- Tachysphex advenus Pulawski, 1974^{i c g}
- Tachysphex aemulus Kohl, 1906^{i c g}
- Tachysphex aequalis W. Fox, 1894^{i c g}
- Tachysphex aethiopicus Arnold, 1923^{i c g}
- Tachysphex aethiops (Cresson, 1865)^{i c g}
- Tachysphex agilis (F. Smith, 1856)^{i c g}
- Tachysphex agnus Pulawski, 1971^{i c g}
- Tachysphex alayoi Pulawski, 1974^{i c g}
- Tachysphex albocinctus (Lucas, 1849)^{i c g}
- Tachysphex alpestris Rohwer, 1908^{i c g}
- Tachysphex ambiguus Arnold, 1923^{i c g}
- Tachysphex ambositrae Leclercq, 1967^{i c g}
- Tachysphex ampijoroa Pulawski, 2007^{i c g}
- Tachysphex amplus W. Fox, 1894^{i c g}
- Tachysphex anceps Arnold, 1945^{i c g}
- Tachysphex angelicus Pulawski, 1988^{i c g}
- Tachysphex angustatus Pulawski, 1967^{i c g}
- Tachysphex angustus Arnold, 1924^{i c g}
- Tachysphex antennatus W. Fox, 1894^{i c g}
- Tachysphex anthracinus Pulawski in Krombein and Pulawski, 1994^{i c g}
- Tachysphex antillarum Pulawski, 1974^{i c g}
- Tachysphex anubis Pulawski, 1964^{i c g}
- Tachysphex apakensis Tsuneki, 1971^{i c g}
- Tachysphex apicalis W. Fox, 1893^{i c g}
- Tachysphex apoctenus Pulawski, 1974^{i c g}
- Tachysphex apricus Pulawski, 1982^{i c g}
- Tachysphex araucanus Pulawski, 1974^{i c g}
- Tachysphex argentatus Gussakovskij, 1952^{i c g}
- Tachysphex argenticeps Arnold, 1959^{i c g}
- Tachysphex argentifrons Arnold, 1924^{i c g}
- Tachysphex arizonac Pulawski, 1982^{i c g}
- Tachysphex armatus Pulawski, 1982^{i c g}
- Tachysphex ashmeadii W. Fox, 1894^{i c g}
- Tachysphex asinus Arnold, 1923^{i c g}
- Tachysphex asmara Pulawski, 2007^{i c g}
- Tachysphex aterrimus Arnold, 1924^{i c g}
- Tachysphex atlanteus de Beaumont, 1955^{i c g}
- Tachysphex atratus (Lepeletier de Saint Fargeau, 1845)^{i c g}
- Tachysphex aureopilosus Tsuneki, 1972^{i c g}
- Tachysphex aureorufoniger Pulawski, 2007^{i c g}
- Tachysphex auriceps Cameron, 1889^{i c g}
- Tachysphex auropilosus R. Turner, 1917^{i c g}
- Tachysphex austriacus Kohl, 1892^{i c g}
- Tachysphex bara Pulawski, 2007^{i c g}
- Tachysphex barkeri Arnold, 1923^{i c g}
- Tachysphex beaumonti Pulawski, 1971^{i c g}
- Tachysphex beidzimiao Tsuneki, 1971^{i c g}
- Tachysphex belfragei (Cresson, 1873)^{i c g}
- Tachysphex bemba Pulawski, 2007^{i c g}
- Tachysphex bengalensis Cameron, 1889^{i c}
- Tachysphex bipustulosus Arnold, 1949^{i c g}
- Tachysphex bituberculatus Cameron, 1905^{i c g}
- Tachysphex blattivorus Gussakovskij, 1952^{i c g}
- Tachysphex bohartorum Pulawski, 1982^{i c g}
- Tachysphex bohemicus Straka, 2016^{g}
- Tachysphex bostryx Pulawski, 2007^{i c g}
- Tachysphex bouceki Straka, 2005^{i c g}
- Tachysphex brachypus Pulawski, 2007^{i c g}
- Tachysphex brasilianus Pulawski, 1974^{i c g}
- Tachysphex braunsi Arnold, 1923^{i c g}
- Tachysphex breviceps Pulawski, 1974^{i c g}
- Tachysphex brevicornis Pulawski, 1977^{i c g}
- Tachysphex brevipecten de Beaumont, 1955^{i c g}
- Tachysphex brevipennis Mercet, 1909^{i c g}
- Tachysphex brevipes Pulawski, 1971^{i c g}
- Tachysphex brinckerae R. Turner, 1917^{i c g}
- Tachysphex brullii (F. Smith, 1856)^{i c g}
- Tachysphex bruneiceps Arnold, 1923^{i c g}
- Tachysphex buccalis Pulawski, 1977^{i c g}
- Tachysphex buyssoni Morice, 1897^{i c g}
- Tachysphex caliban Arnold, 1923^{i c}
- Tachysphex calidus Pulawski, 2007^{i c g}
- Tachysphex camptopygus Pulawski, 2007^{i c g}
- Tachysphex capensis (de Saussure, 1867)^{i c g}
- Tachysphex carinatus Pulawski, 2007^{i c g}
- Tachysphex carli de Beaumont, 1947^{i c g}
- Tachysphex cavatus Pulawski, 2007^{i c g}
- Tachysphex changi Tsuneki, 1967^{i c g}
- Tachysphex cheops de Beaumont, 1940^{i c g}
- Tachysphex chephren de Beaumont, 1940^{i c g}
- Tachysphex chiastotrichus Pulawski in Krombein and Pulawski, 1994^{i c g}
- Tachysphex circulans Pulawski, 1977^{i c g}
- Tachysphex clarconis Viereck, 1906^{i c g}
- Tachysphex claripes Arnold, 1924^{i c g}
- Tachysphex clypeatus Arnold, 1947^{i c g}
- Tachysphex clypedentalis T. Li, Cai and Q. Li, 2008^{i c g}
- Tachysphex cockerellae Rohwer, 1914^{i c g}
- Tachysphex cocopa Pulawski, 1988^{i c g}
- Tachysphex conceptus Pulawski, 1974^{i c g}
- Tachysphex conclusus Nurse, 1903^{i c g}
- Tachysphex confrater Pulawski, 1971^{i c g}
- Tachysphex congoensis Arnold, 1924^{i c g}
- Tachysphex consocius Kohl, 1892^{i c g}
- Tachysphex contrarius Pulawski, 1977^{i c g}
- Tachysphex coquilletti Rohwer, 1911^{i c g}
- Tachysphex coriaceus (A. Costa, 1867)^{i c g}
- Tachysphex costae (De Stefani Perez, 1882)^{i c g}
- Tachysphex coxalis Pulawski, 2007^{i c g}
- Tachysphex crassiformis Viereck, 1906^{i c g}
- Tachysphex crassipes Arnold, 1923^{i c g}
- Tachysphex crenulatus W. Fox, 1894^{i c g}
- Tachysphex cretensis Straka, 2016^{g}
- Tachysphex crinitus Pulawski in Krombein and Pulawski, 1994^{i c g}
- Tachysphex crocodilus Pulawski, 1971^{i c g}
- Tachysphex ctenophorus Pulawski, 1971^{i c g}
- Tachysphex cubanus Pulawski, 1974^{i c g}
- Tachysphex curvipes Pulawski, 2007^{i c g}
- Tachysphex denisi de Beaumont, 1936^{i c g}
- Tachysphex depressiventris R. Turner, 1916^{i c g}
- Tachysphex descendentis Mercet, 1909^{i c g}
- Tachysphex deserticola de Beaumont, 1940^{i c g}
- Tachysphex desertorum F. Morawitz, 1894^{i c g}
- Tachysphex detritus Arnold, 1924^{i c g}
- Tachysphex diabolicus Arnold, 1923^{i c g}
- Tachysphex diadelus Pulawski in Krombein and Pulawski, 1994^{i c g}
- Tachysphex dignus Kohl in Kohl and Handlirsch, 1889^{i c g}
- Tachysphex dimidiatus Panzer, 1809^{g}
- Tachysphex discrepans R. Turner, 1915^{i c g}
- Tachysphex dissimulatus Pulawski, 2007^{i c g}
- Tachysphex diversilabris Arnold, 1960^{i c g}
- Tachysphex dolosus Arnold, 1923^{i c g}
- Tachysphex dominicanus Pulawski, 1988^{i c g}
- Tachysphex drymobius Pulawski in Krombein and Pulawski, 1994^{i c g}
- Tachysphex dzinghis Tsuneki, 1972^{i c g}
- Tachysphex ebeninus Arnold, 1929^{i c g}
- Tachysphex eldoradensis Rohwer, 1917^{i c g}
- Tachysphex erectus Pulawski, 2007^{i c g}
- Tachysphex erythrophorus Dalla Torre, 1897^{i c g}
- Tachysphex erythropus (Spinola, 1839)^{i c g}
- Tachysphex erythrurus Pulawski, 2007^{i c g}
- Tachysphex eucalypticus Pulawski, 1977^{i c g}
- Tachysphex eucharistus Pulawski in Krombein and Pulawski, 1994^{i c g}
- Tachysphex eurystoma Pulawski, 2007^{i c g}
- Tachysphex euxinus Pulawski, 1958^{i c g}
- Tachysphex excavatus Pulawski, 2007^{i c g}
- Tachysphex excelsus R. Turner, 1917^{i c g}
- Tachysphex excisus Arnold, 1945^{i c g}
- Tachysphex eximius Pulawski, 1971^{i c g}
- Tachysphex fanuiensis Cheesman, 1928^{i c g}
- Tachysphex fasciatus Morice, 1897^{i c}
- Tachysphex ferrugineus Pulawski, 1971^{i c g}
- Tachysphex flavofimbriatus Arnold, 1945^{i c g}
- Tachysphex foliaceus Pulawski, 1977^{i c g}
- Tachysphex formosanus Tsuneki, 1971^{i c g}
- Tachysphex fortior R. Turner, 1908^{i c g}
- Tachysphex frigidus Pulawski, 2007^{i c g}
- Tachysphex fugax (Radoszkowski, 1877)^{i c g}
- Tachysphex fulgidus Arnold, 1924^{i c g}
- Tachysphex fulviantennatus Tsuneki, 1976^{i c g}
- Tachysphex fulvitarsis (A. Costa, 1867)^{i c g}
- Tachysphex fuscispina Pulawski, 1971^{i c g}
- Tachysphex gagates Arnold, 1940^{i c g}
- Tachysphex galapagensis Rohwer, 1924^{i c g}
- Tachysphex galeatus Pulawski, 1977^{i c g}
- Tachysphex gastrotrichus Pulawski, 2007^{i c g}
- Tachysphex gegen Tsuneki, 1971^{i c g}
- Tachysphex geniculatus (Spinola, 1839)^{i c g}
- Tachysphex georgii Arnold, 1940^{i c g}
- Tachysphex gessianus Pulawski, 2007^{i c g}
- Tachysphex glaber Kohl, 1906^{i c g}
- Tachysphex glabrior F. Williams, 1914^{i c g}
- Tachysphex gracilicornis Mercet, 1909^{i c g}
- Tachysphex gracilitarsis Morice in E. Saunders, 1910^{i c g}
- Tachysphex graecus Kohl, 1883^{i c g}
- Tachysphex grandissimus Gussakovskij, 1933^{i c g}
- Tachysphex gryllivorus Pulawski in Krombein and Pulawski, 1994^{i c g}
- Tachysphex gujaraticus Nurse, 1909^{i c g}
- Tachysphex gussakovskii Pulawski, 1971^{i c g}
- Tachysphex hadronyx Pulawski, 2007^{i c g}
- Tachysphex haematopus Pulawski in Krombein and Pulawski, 1994^{i c g}
- Tachysphex harpax Arnold, 1923^{i c g}
- Tachysphex helveticus Kohl, 1885^{i c g}
- Tachysphex hermia Arnold, 1924^{i c g}
- Tachysphex hippolyta Arnold, 1924^{i c g}
- Tachysphex hopi Pulawski, 1988^{i c g}
- Tachysphex horus de Beaumont, 1940^{i c g}
- Tachysphex hostilis Kohl, 1901^{i c g}
- Tachysphex huchiti Pulawski, 1988^{i c g}
- Tachysphex humilis Straka, 2005^{i c g}
- Tachysphex hungaricus Straka, 2016^{g}
- Tachysphex hurdi R. Bohart, 1962^{i c g}
- Tachysphex hypoleius (F. Smith, 1856)^{i c g}
- Tachysphex iaphetes Pulawski, 2007^{i c g}
- Tachysphex ibi Pulawski, 2007^{i c g}
- Tachysphex idiotrichus Pulawski, 1982^{i c g}
- Tachysphex idzekii Tsuneki, 1971^{i c g}
- Tachysphex imbellis R. Turner, 1908^{i c g}
- Tachysphex incanus de Beaumont, 1940^{i c g}
- Tachysphex incertus (Radoszkowski, 1877)^{i c g}
- Tachysphex inconspicuus (W.F. Kirby, 1890)^{i c g}
- Tachysphex indicus Pulawski in Krombein and Pulawski, 1994^{i c g}
- Tachysphex inextricabilis Pulawski, 1971^{i c g}
- Tachysphex instructus Nurse, 1909^{i c g}
- Tachysphex insulsus Arnold, 1945^{i c g}
- Tachysphex iridipennis (F. Smith, 1873)^{i c g}
- Tachysphex irregularis Pulawski, 1982^{i c g}
- Tachysphex isis de Beaumont, 1940^{i c g}
- Tachysphex jokischianus (Panzer, 1809)^{g}
- Tachysphex jujuyensis Brèthes, 1913^{i c g}
- Tachysphex julliani Kohl, 1883^{i c g}
- Tachysphex kalaharicus Arnold, 1924^{i c g}
- Tachysphex karasi Straka, 2005^{i c g}
- Tachysphex karoo Pulawski, 2007^{i c g}
- Tachysphex kaszabi Tsuneki, 1972^{i c g}
- Tachysphex khoikhoi Pulawski, 2007^{i c g}
- Tachysphex kodairai Tsuneki, 1971^{i c g}
- Tachysphex krombeini Kurczewski, 1971^{i c g}
- Tachysphex krombeiniellus Pulawski, 1982^{i c g}
- Tachysphex lacertosus Arnold, 1944^{i c g}
- Tachysphex laevifrons (F. Smith, 1856)^{i c g}
- Tachysphex lagunaensis Tsuneki, 1983^{i c g}
- Tachysphex lamellatus Pulawski, 1982^{i c g}
- Tachysphex laticauda Gussakovskij, 1933^{i c g}
- Tachysphex latifrons Kohl, 1884^{i c g}
- Tachysphex limatus Arnold, 1924^{i c g}
- Tachysphex lindbergi de Beaumont, 1956^{i c g}
- Tachysphex linsleyi R. Bohart, 1962^{i c g}
- Tachysphex liriformis Pulawski, 1967^{i c g}
- Tachysphex longipalpis de Beaumont, 1940^{i c g}
- Tachysphex longipes Pulawski, 2007^{i c g}
- Tachysphex lucillus Pulawski, 1971^{i c g}
- Tachysphex luctuosus Arnold, 1924^{i c g}
- Tachysphex luxuriosus Morice, 1897^{i c g}
- Tachysphex mackayensis R. Turner, 1908^{i c g}
- Tachysphex maculipennis Pulawski, 1977^{i c g}
- Tachysphex magnaemontis Hensen in Hensen and Ooijen, 1987^{i c g}
- Tachysphex malkovskii Pulawski, 1971^{i c g}
- Tachysphex marshalli R. Turner, 1917^{i c g}
- Tachysphex mashona Arnold, 1929^{i c g}
- Tachysphex mauretanus Pulawski, 1971^{i c g}
- Tachysphex maurus Rohwer, 1911^{i c g}
- Tachysphex maximus Pulawski, 1977^{i c g}
- Tachysphex maya Pulawski, 1988^{i c g}
- Tachysphex mediterraneus Kohl, 1883^{i c g}
- Tachysphex melanius Pulawski, 2007^{i c g}
- Tachysphex melas Kohl, 1898^{i c g}
- Tachysphex mendozanus Brèthes, 1913^{i c g}
- Tachysphex menkei Pulawski, 1982^{i c g}
- Tachysphex merina Pulawski, 2007^{i g}
- Tachysphex mesembrius Pulawski, 2007^{i c g}
- Tachysphex micans (Radoszkowski, 1877)^{i c g}
- Tachysphex miniatulus Arnold, 1924^{i c g}
- Tachysphex mirandus Pulawski, 1982^{i c g}
- Tachysphex miwok Pulawski, 1988^{i c g}
- Tachysphex mkomazi Pulawski, 2007^{i c g}
- Tachysphex mocsaryi Kohl, 1884^{i c g}
- Tachysphex moczari Tsuneki, 1972^{i c g}
- Tachysphex modestus Arnold, 1924^{i c g}
- Tachysphex montanus (Cresson, 1865)^{i c g}
- Tachysphex montivagus Arnold, 1944^{i c g}
- Tachysphex morawitzi Pulawski, 1971^{i c g}
- Tachysphex morosus (F. Smith, 1858)^{i c g}
- Tachysphex multifasciatus Pulawski in Evans, Matthews and Pulawski, 1976^{i c g}
- Tachysphex mundus W. Fox, 1894^{i c g}
- Tachysphex musciventris Pulawski, 1982^{i c g}
- Tachysphex mycerinus de Beaumont, 1940^{i c g}
- Tachysphex mzingeli Pulawski, 2007^{i c g}
- Tachysphex namaqua Pulawski, 2007^{i c g}
- Tachysphex naranhun Tsuneki, 1971^{i c g}
- Tachysphex nasalis F. Morawitz, 1893^{i c g}
- Tachysphex nefarius Pulawski, 1977^{i c g}
- Tachysphex nigerrimus (F. Smith, 1856)^{i c g}
- Tachysphex nigricolor (Dalla Torre, 1897)^{i c g}
- Tachysphex nigripennis (Spinola, 1808)^{g}
- Tachysphex niloticus Pulawski, 1964^{i c g}
- Tachysphex nitidior de Beaumont, 1940^{i c g}
- Tachysphex nitidissimus de Beaumont, 1952^{i c g}
- Tachysphex nitidus (Spinola, 1805)^{i c g}
- Tachysphex noar Pulawski in Krombein and Pulawski, 1994^{i c g}
- Tachysphex nobilis Straka, 2016^{g}
- Tachysphex nonakai Tsuneki, 1971^{i c g}
- Tachysphex notogoniaeformis Nadig, 1933^{i c g}
- Tachysphex novarae (de Saussure, 1867)^{i c g}
- Tachysphex oasicola Pulawski, 1988^{i c g}
- Tachysphex oberon Arnold, 1923^{i c g}
- Tachysphex obscuripennis (Schenck, 1857)^{i c g}
- Tachysphex obscurus Pulawski, 1971^{i c g}
- Tachysphex occidentalis Pulawski, 1982^{i c g}
- Tachysphex octodentatus Arnold, 1924^{i c g}
- Tachysphex omoi Guiglia, 1943^{i c g}
- Tachysphex onager Pulawski, 2007^{i c g}
- Tachysphex opacus F. Morawitz, 1893^{i c g}
- Tachysphex opata Pulawski, 1988^{i c g}
- Tachysphex orestes Pulawski, 1988^{i c g}
- Tachysphex osiris de Beaumont, 1940^{i c g}
- Tachysphex ovambo Pulawski, 2007^{i c g}
- Tachysphex oxychelus Pulawski in Krombein and Pulawski, 1994^{i c g}
- Tachysphex pacificus R. Turner, 1908^{i c g}
- Tachysphex paiute Pulawski, 1988^{i c g}
- Tachysphex palopterus (Dahlbom, 1845)^{i c g}
- Tachysphex panzeri (Vander Linden, 1829)^{i c}
- Tachysphex papago Pulawski, 1982^{i c g}
- Tachysphex paucispina Pulawski, 1977^{i c g}
- Tachysphex paulus Pulawski, 2007^{i c g}
- Tachysphex pauxillus W. Fox, 1894^{i c g}
- Tachysphex pechumani Krombein, 1938^{i c g}
- Tachysphex pectinatus Pulawski, 1974^{i c g}
- Tachysphex pekingensis Tsuneki, 1971^{i c g}
- Tachysphex pentheri Cameron, 1905^{i c g}
- Tachysphex perniger Arnold, 1947^{i c g}
- Tachysphex persa Gussakovskij, 1933^{i c g}
- Tachysphex persistans R. Turner, 1916^{i c g}
- Tachysphex peruanus Pulawski, 1986^{i c g}
- Tachysphex picnic van Ooijen in Hensen and van Ooijen, 1987^{i c g}
- Tachysphex pilosellus Pulawski, 1971^{i c g}
- Tachysphex pilosulus R. Turner, 1908^{i c g}
- Tachysphex pinal Pulawski, 1988^{i c g}
- Tachysphex pisonoides (Reed, 1894)^{i c g}
- Tachysphex pisonopsis Pulawski, 1974^{i c g}
- Tachysphex platypus Pulawski, 1977^{i c g}
- Tachysphex platystethus Pulawski, 2007^{i c g}
- Tachysphex pleuralis Pulawski, 1977^{i c g}
- Tachysphex plicosus (A. Costa, 1867)^{i c g}
- Tachysphex politus Pulawski, 1977^{i c g}
- Tachysphex pompiliformis (Panzer, 1804)^{i c g b}
- Tachysphex powelli R. Bohart, 1962^{i c g}
- Tachysphex priesneri de Beaumont, 1940^{i c g}
- Tachysphex prismaticus Straka, 2005^{i c g}
- Tachysphex prosopigastroides Bischoff, 1913^{i c g}
- Tachysphex proteus Pulawski, 1977^{i c g}
- Tachysphex psammobius (Kohl, 1880)^{i c g}
- Tachysphex pseudofasciatus Pulawski, 2007^{i c g}
- Tachysphex pseudopanzeri de Beaumont, 1955^{i c g}
- Tachysphex psilocerus Kohl, 1884^{i c g}
- Tachysphex psilonotus Pulawski, 2007^{i c g}
- Tachysphex ptah Pulawski, 1964^{i c g}
- Tachysphex pubescens Pulawski, 1977^{i c g}
- Tachysphex pugnator R. Turner, 1908^{i c g}
- Tachysphex pulcher Pulawski, 1967^{i c g}
- Tachysphex punctatiformis Arnold, 1923^{i c g}
- Tachysphex punctatus (F. Smith, 1856)^{i c g}
- Tachysphex puncticeps Cameron, 1903^{i c g}
- Tachysphex punctifrons (W. Fox, 1891)^{i c g}
- Tachysphex punctiger Pulawski, 2007^{i c g}
- Tachysphex punctipes Pulawski, 1967^{i c g}
- Tachysphex punctipleuris Straka, 2016^{g}
- Tachysphex pusulosus de Beaumont, 1955^{i c g}
- Tachysphex quadricolor (Gerstaecker in Peters, 1858)^{i c g}
- Tachysphex quisqueyus Pulawski, 1988^{i c g}
- Tachysphex radiatus Gussakovskij, 1952^{i c g}
- Tachysphex radoszkowskyi F. Morawitz, 1893^{i c g}
- Tachysphex ramses Pulawski, 1971^{i c g}
- Tachysphex rapax Pulawski, 2007^{i c g}
- Tachysphex reedi Menke in Pulawski, 1974^{i c g}
- Tachysphex remotus Pulawski, 1974^{i c g}
- Tachysphex rhacodes Pulawski, 2007^{i c g}
- Tachysphex rhodesianus Bischoff, 1913^{i c g}
- Tachysphex rhynchocephalus Pulawski, 1977^{i c g}
- Tachysphex robustior F. Williams, 1914^{i c g}
- Tachysphex rotundus Pulawski, 2007^{i c g}
- Tachysphex ruber Pulawski, 2007^{i c g}
- Tachysphex rubicundus Pulawski, 1971^{i c g}
- Tachysphex ruficaudis (Taschenberg, 1870)^{i c g}
- Tachysphex rufitarsis (Spinola, 1851)^{i c g}
- Tachysphex rufopictus Arnold, 1929^{i c g}
- Tachysphex rugicauda Pulawski in Krombein and Pulawski, 1994^{i c g}
- Tachysphex rugosipleuris Pulawski, 2007^{i c g}
- Tachysphex sabulosus Pulawski, 2007^{i c g}
- Tachysphex saevus Arnold, 1924^{i c g}
- Tachysphex sahelensis Pulawski, 2007^{i c g}
- Tachysphex samburu Pulawski, 2007^{i c g}
- Tachysphex saturnus Arnold, 1924^{i c g}
- Tachysphex saundersi Mercet, 1909^{i c g}
- Tachysphex scaber Pulawski, 2007^{i c g}
- Tachysphex scaurus Arnold, 1945^{i c g}
- Tachysphex schmiedeknechti Kohl, 1883^{i c g}
- Tachysphex schoenlandi Cameron, 1905^{i c g}
- Tachysphex scopa Pulawski, 2007^{i c g}
- Tachysphex scopaeus Pulawski, 1988^{i c g}
- Tachysphex semirufus (Cresson, 1865)^{i c g}
- Tachysphex sericans Gussakovskij, 1952^{i c g}
- Tachysphex sericeus (F. Smith, 1856)^{i c g}
- Tachysphex sexinus Leclercq, 1961^{i c g}
- Tachysphex seyrigi Arnold, 1945^{i c g}
- Tachysphex siitanus Tsuneki, 1971^{i c g}
- Tachysphex silvestris Pulawski, 2007^{i c g}
- Tachysphex similis Rohwer, 1910^{i c g b}
- Tachysphex smissenae Straka, 2016^{g}
- Tachysphex socotrae Pulawski, 2007^{i c g}
- Tachysphex solaris Pulawski, 1982^{i c g}
- Tachysphex sonorensis (Cameron, 1889)^{i c g}
- Tachysphex sordidus (Dahlbom, 1845)^{i c g}
- Tachysphex spatulifer Pulawski, 1982^{i c g}
- Tachysphex speciosissimus Morice, 1897^{i c g}
- Tachysphex spectrum Pulawski, 2007^{i c g}
- Tachysphex spinulosus Pulawski, 1975^{i c g}
- Tachysphex splendidulus F. Morawitz, 1893^{i c g}
- Tachysphex spretus Kohl, 1901^{i c g}
- Tachysphex sri Pulawski in Krombein and Pulawski, 1994^{i c g}
- Tachysphex stachi de Beaumont, 1936^{i c g}
- Tachysphex stevensoni Arnold, 1924^{i c g}
- Tachysphex stimulator R. Turner, 1916^{i c g}
- Tachysphex stysi Straka, 2008^{i c g}
- Tachysphex suavis Arnold, 1929^{i c g}
- Tachysphex subandinus Pulawski, 1974^{i c g}
- Tachysphex subcoriaceus Arnold, 1945^{i c g}
- Tachysphex subdentatus F. Morawitz, 1893^{i c g}
- Tachysphex subfimbriatus Arnold, 1924^{i c g}
- Tachysphex subopacus R. Turner, 1910^{i c g}
- Tachysphex sulcatus Pulawski, 1988^{i c g}
- Tachysphex sulcidorsum de Beaumont, 1950^{i c g}
- Tachysphex svetlanae Pulawski, 1971^{i c g}
- Tachysphex sycorax Arnold, 1923^{i c g}
- Tachysphex sympleuron Pulawski in Krombein and Pulawski, 1994^{i c g}
- Tachysphex tahoe Pulawski, 1988^{i c g}
- Tachysphex taita Pulawski, 2007^{i c g}
- Tachysphex tanqua Pulawski, 2007^{i c g}
- Tachysphex tarsatus (Say, 1823)^{i c g}
- Tachysphex tarsinus (Lepeletier de Saint Fargeau, 1845)^{i c g}
- Tachysphex tembe Pulawski, 2007^{i c g}
- Tachysphex tenuicornis Bischoff, 1913^{i c g}
- Tachysphex tenuis R. Turner, 1908^{i c g}
- Tachysphex tenuisculptus Pulawski, 1977^{i c g}
- Tachysphex terminatus (F. Smith, 1856)^{i c g}
- Tachysphex tessellatus (Dahlbom, 1845)^{i c g}
- Tachysphex testaceipes Bingham, 1897^{i c g}
- Tachysphex texanus (Cresson, 1873)^{i c g}
- Tachysphex theseus Arnold, 1951^{i c g}
- Tachysphex thysanomerus Pulawski, 2007^{i c g}
- Tachysphex tipai Pulawski, 1988^{i c g}
- Tachysphex titania Arnold, 1923^{i c g}
- Tachysphex toltec Pulawski, 1988^{i c g}
- Tachysphex truncatifrons R. Turner, 1908^{i c g}
- Tachysphex tryssus Pulawski, 2007^{i c g}
- Tachysphex tsil Pulawski, 1988^{i c g}
- Tachysphex ulonyovu Pulawski, 2007^{i c g}
- Tachysphex ulothrix Pulawski, 2007^{i c g}
- Tachysphex undatus (F. Smith, 1856)^{i c g}
- Tachysphex unicolor (Panzer, 1807)^{i c g}
- Tachysphex usakos Pulawski, 2007^{i c g}
- Tachysphex utina Pulawski, 1988^{i c g}
- Tachysphex vanrhynsi Arnold, 1940^{i c g}
- Tachysphex vardyi Pulawski, 1977^{i c g}
- Tachysphex venator Arnold, 1960^{i c g}
- Tachysphex verticalis Pulawski, 1982^{i c g}
- Tachysphex vestitus Kohl, 1892^{i c g}
- Tachysphex vitiensis F. Williams, 1928^{i c g}
- Tachysphex vividus Pulawski, 1977^{i c g}
- Tachysphex vulneratus R. Turner, 1917^{i c g}
- Tachysphex walkeri R. Turner, 1908^{i c g}
- Tachysphex waltoni Arnold, 1940^{i c g}
- Tachysphex williamsi R. Bohart, 1962^{i c g}
- Tachysphex xanthoptesimus Pulawski in Krombein and Pulawski, 1994^{i c g}
- Tachysphex yarrowi de Beaumont, 1960^{i c g}
- Tachysphex yolo Pulawski, 1982^{i c g}
- Tachysphex yuma Pulawski, 1982^{i c g}
- Tachysphex zambius Pulawski, 2007^{i c g}
- Tachysphex ziziphi Pulawski, 2007^{i c g}

Data sources: i = ITIS, c = Catalogue of Life, g = GBIF, b = Bugguide.net
