= John G. Duman =

Biology professor

- Education: Pennsylvania State University; Scripps Institution of Oceanography at University of California, San Diego
- Scientific career
- Workplaces: University of Notre Dame
- Thesis: (1974)
- Doctoral advisor: Arthur L. Devries

John G. Duman is the Gillen Professor of Biological Sciences at the University of Notre Dame in South Bend, Indiana, in the area of environmental physiology with particular focus on freeze avoidance and freeze tolerance in insects. He joined the faculty at Notre Dame in 1974 following the completion of his doctorate in marine biology at the Scripps Institution of Oceanography under Arthur L. DeVries. Duman served as Assistant Dean from 1982 to 1987 and subsequently as Associate Dean for the Notre Dame College of Science from 1987, until his tenure as Chair of the Department of Biological Sciences from 1993 to 2002.
