= Tachysphex similis =

Scientific classification
- Domain: Eukaryota
- Kingdom: Animalia
- Phylum: Arthropoda
- Class: Insecta
- Order: Hymenoptera
- Family: Crabronidae
- Subtribe: Gastrosericina
- Genus: Tachysphex
- Species: T. similis

Binomial name
- Tachysphex similis Rohwer, 1910

Synonyms
- Tachysphex similans Rohwer, 1910

Species of wasp

Tachysphex similis is a species of square-headed wasp in the family Crabronidae. It is found in Central America and North America.
