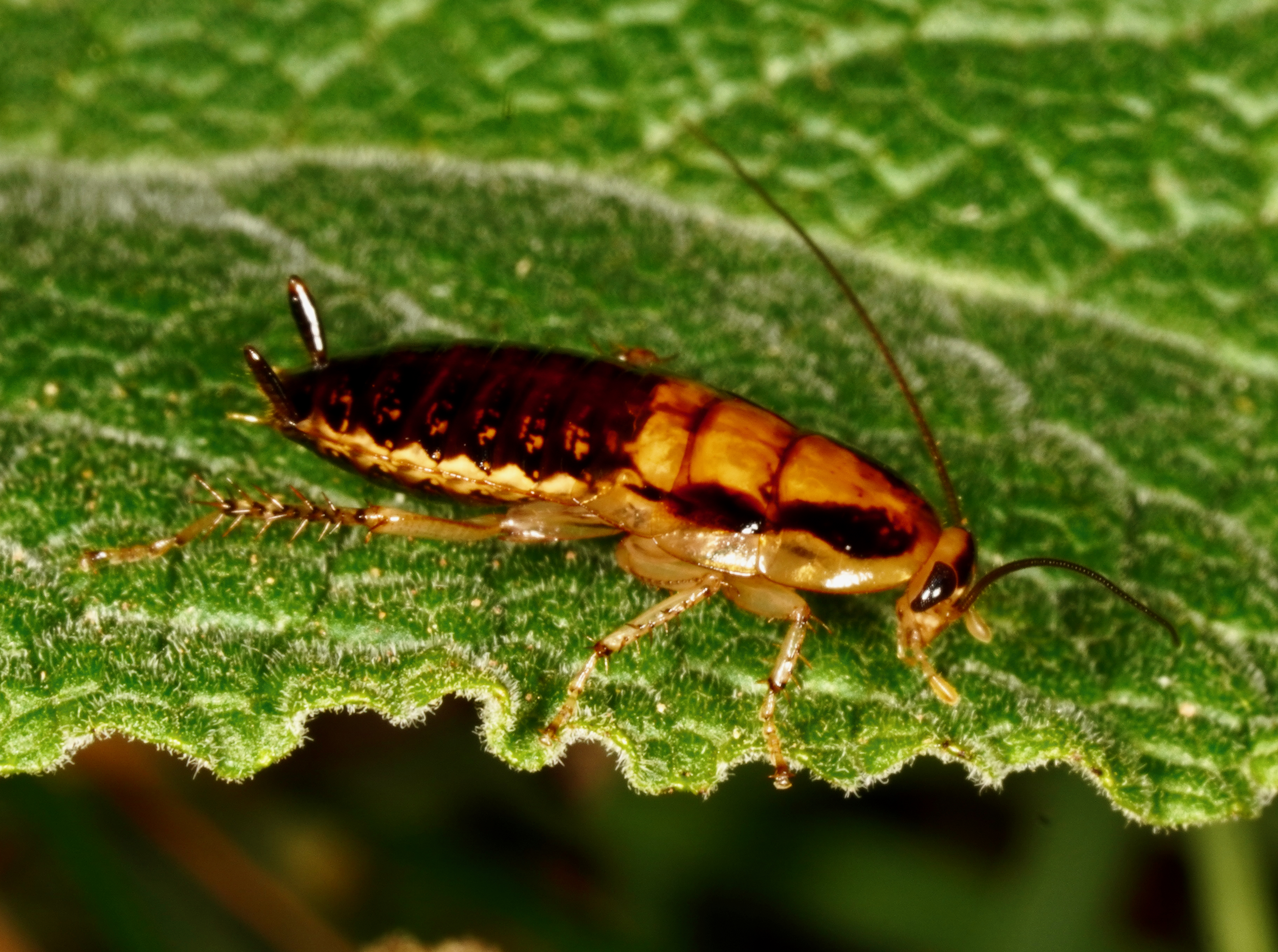

Scientific classification
- Kingdom: Animalia
- Phylum: Arthropoda
- Clade: Pancrustacea
- Class: Insecta
- Order: Blattodea
- Family: Blattidae
- Genus: Celatoblatta
- Species: C. vulgaris

Binomial name
- Celatoblatta vulgaris (Johns, 1966)

= Celatoblatta vulgaris =

Native bush cockroach

Species of cockroach

Celatoblatta vulgaris, also known as the native bush cockroach, is a small, flightless species of blattid cockroach endemic to New Zealand. They are not a household pest.

Belonging to the nocturnal genus Celatoblatta, they hide during the day under rotting logs, bark, rocks and leaf litter.

As adults the cockroaches are around 12–14 mm (0.47–0.55 in) in length. This species generally has yellow-brown colouration, with South Island populations typically having darker colouration than North Island populations. Pale blotches mark the top surface of C. vulgaris.

== Taxonomy ==
This species was first described in 1966 by entomologist by Peter Johns.

== Distribution ==
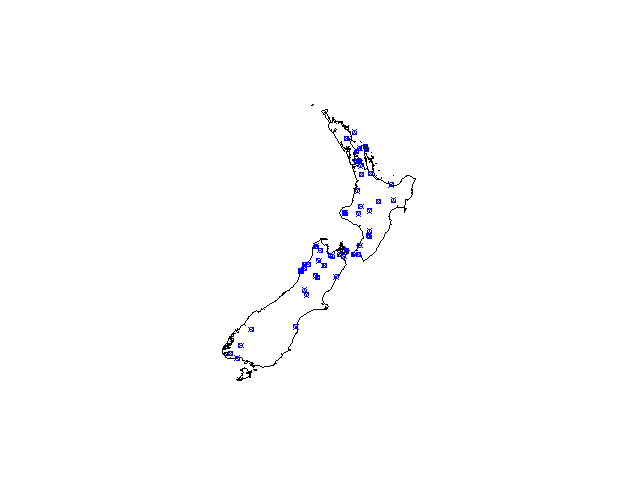
Observations of Celatoblatta vulgaris from iNaturalist.

C. vulgaris is the most abundant and widely distributed endemic New Zealand cockroach species.

The broad distribution of C. vulgaris is likely due to the wide range of habitats and climate types they occupy, demonstrating their diversification into different ecological niches. They are found across a wide elevational range, from lowland Kauri Forest, podocarp forest, Nothofagus Forest through to rock scree habitats of the alpine zone, and a variety of secondary growth and scrub types in between.

During the Pliocene-Pleistocene, the increasing variation of New Zealand's landscape and climate drove the adaptive radiation of this group into diverse climate types.

== Habitat ==
Celatoblatta vulgaris occupies a wide range of habitats. Specimens have been recorded in various forest types, including kauri, podocarp, and Nothofagus (beech) forests.

They are often located beneath the bark of beech trees (Nothofagus spp.), within fallen timber in Nothofagus forests at Maruia Springs and Reefton (Buller), Craigieburn, Castle Hill, Cass, Klondyke Corner, and Mt. White (Hurunui), and from galleries (pre-existing chambers formed typically by other insects) in dead manuka (Leptospermum scoparium) branches at Charming Creek (Nelson)

Specimens have been collected from several locations, including Edwards valley, Cora Lynn, Erewhon, Mathias valley, Riccarton bush (Christchurch), and Pyramid peak, as well as lowland, mixed broadleaf-podocarp forest in the Orongorongo Valley near Wellington. C. vulgaris has also been sampled from Lake Taupo, Mt Roberts and Okuru.

== Life history ==
Celatoblatta vulgaris has six instars with at least five juvenile stages and the adult stage. There is overlap between juvenile size classes four and five, this overlap suggests they likely encompass three instars.

Oothecae are continually laid throughout the year. Oothecae are the dark coloured capsules the females produce that contain and protect 12–14 developing eggs and are typically found "glued" to bark or tree trunks. The oothecae capsules measure 6.75 mm × 3.8 mm (0.27 in × 0.15 in)

C. vulgaris displays a disproportionate sex ratio in the adults, with males outnumbering the females.

== Parasites ==
This species is known to be parasitised by the thelastomatid nematode, Protrellus dalei, a parasitic species that inhabits the colon of the hindgut of C. vulgaris. This is a widespread species of nematode throughout New Zealand, which is known to infect other Celatoblatta species.
