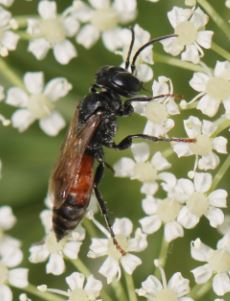

Scientific classification
- Domain: Eukaryota
- Kingdom: Animalia
- Phylum: Arthropoda
- Class: Insecta
- Order: Hymenoptera
- Family: Crabronidae
- Genus: Tachysphex
- Species: T. pompiliformis

Binomial name
- Tachysphex pompiliformis (Panzer, 1804)

Synonyms
- See text

= Tachysphex pompiliformis =

Species of wasp

Tachysphex pompiliformis is a species of square-headed wasp in the family Crabronidae. The limits of the species were redefined in 2016, when it was recognized that the name pompiliformis had been misapplied to at least 14 very similar species, some of which had already been named, and others which had not; of 16 former synonyms of pompiliformis, four were restored to species status (Tachysphex austriacus, Tachysphex dimidiatus, Tachysphex jokischianus, and Tachysphex nigripennis), and the status of the remainder is uncertain. As such, the distribution of this taxon is somewhat uncertain, pending a rigorous review of existing specimens, though it has been definitively confirmed as occurring in Austria, Bulgaria, Czech Republic, France, Germany, Greece, Hungary, Italy, Kyrgyzstan, Portugal, Slovakia, Switzerland, and Turkey, while pompiliformis specimens reported from other locations most likely represent other species.
