= Insect winter ecology =

Survival strategies of insects during winter

Insect winter ecology describes the overwinter survival strategies of insects, which are in many respects more similar to those of plants than to many other animals, such as mammals and birds. Unlike those animals, which can generate their own heat internally (endothermic), insects must rely on external sources to provide their heat (ectothermic). Thus, insects persisting in winter weather must tolerate freezing or rely on other mechanisms to avoid freezing. Loss of enzymatic function and eventual freezing due to low temperatures daily threatens the livelihood of these organisms during winter. In response, insects have evolved a number of strategies to deal with the rigors of winter temperatures in places where they would otherwise not survive.

Two broad strategies for winter survival have evolved within Insecta as solutions to their inability to generate significant heat metabolically. Migration is a complete avoidance of the temperatures that pose a threat. An alternative to migration is weathering the cold temperatures present in its normal habitat. Insect cold tolerance is generally separated into two strategies, freeze avoidance and freeze tolerance.

== Migration ==
Migration of insects differs from migration of birds. Bird migration is a two-way, round-trip movement of each individual, whereas this is not usually the case with insects. As a consequence of the (typically) short lifespan of insects, adult insects who have completed one leg of the trip may be replaced by a member of the next generation on the return voyage. As a result, invertebrate biologists redefine migration for this group of organisms in three parts:

1. A persistent, straight-line movement away from the natal area
2. Distinctive pre- and post-movement behaviors
3. Re-allocation of energy within the body associated with the movement

This definition allows for mass insect movements to be considered as migration. Perhaps the best known insect migration is that of the monarch butterfly. The monarch in North America migrates from as far north as Canada southward to Mexico and Southern California annually from about August to October. The population east of the Rocky Mountains overwinters in Michoacán, Mexico, and the western population overwinters in various sites in central coastal California, notably in Pacific Grove and Santa Cruz. The round trip journey is typically around 3,600 km in length. The longest one-way flight on record for monarchs is 3,009 km from Ontario, Canada to San Luis Potosí, Mexico. They use the direction of sunlight and magnetic cues to orient themselves during migration.

The monarch requires significant energy to make such a long flight, which is provided by fat reserves. When they reach their overwintering sites, they begin a period of lowered metabolic rate. Nectar from flowers procured at the overwintering site provides energy for the northward migration. To limit their energy use, monarchs congregate in large clusters in order to maintain a suitable temperature. This strategy, similar to huddling in small mammals, makes use of body heat from all the organisms and lowers heat loss.

Another common winter migrant insect, found in much of North America, South America, and the Caribbean, is the green darner. Migration patterns in this dragonfly species are much less studied than those of monarchs. Green darners leave their northern ranges in September and migrate south. Studies have noted a seasonal influx of green darners to southern Florida, which indicates migratory behavior. Little has been done with tracking of the green darner, and reasons for migration are not fully understood since there are both resident and migrant populations. The common cue for migration southward in this species is the onset of winter.

== Cold tolerance ==
Insects that do not migrate from regions with the onset of colder temperatures must devise strategies to either tolerate or avoid lethal freezing of intracellular and extracellular body fluids. Insects that survive subfreezing temperatures are generally classified as freeze-avoidant or freeze-tolerant. The general strategy adopted by insects differs between the Northern Hemisphere and the Southern Hemisphere. In temperate regions of the northern hemisphere where cold temperatures are expected seasonally and are usually for long periods of time, the main strategy is freeze avoidance. In temperate regions of the southern hemisphere, where seasonal cold temperatures are not as extreme or long lasting, freeze tolerance is more common. However, in the Arctic, where freezing occurs seasonally, and for extended periods (>9 months), freeze tolerance also predominates.

=== Dangers of freezing ===
Intracellular ice formation usually causes cell death, even in freeze-tolerant species, due to physical stresses exerted as ice crystals expand. Ice formation in extracellular spaces increases the concentration of solutes in the extracellular fluid, resulting in the osmotic flow of water from intracellular spaces to extracellular spaces. Changes in solute concentration and dehydration can cause changes in enzyme activity and lead to the denaturation of proteins. If the temperature continues to decrease, the water that was drawn out of cells will also freeze, causing further cell shrinkage. Excessive cell shrinkage is dangerous because as ice forms outside the cell, the possible shapes that can be assumed by the cells are increasingly limited, causing damaging deformation. Finally, the expansion of ice within vessels and other spaces can cause physical damage to structures and tissues.

=== Freeze avoidance ===
Freeze-avoidant insects cannot tolerate internal ice formation, so they avoid freezing by depressing the temperature at which their body fluids freeze. This is done through supercooling, the process by which a liquid cools below its freezing point without changing phase into a solid. In order for water to freeze, a nucleus must be present upon which an ice crystal can begin to grow. At low temperatures, nuclei may arise spontaneously from clusters of slow-moving water molecules. Alternatively, substances that facilitate the aggregation of water molecules can increase the probability that they will reach the critical size necessary for ice formation. If no source of nucleation is introduced, water can cool down to −48 °C without freezing. Therefore, when an insect maintains its body fluids in a supercooled state, there is the risk that spontaneous ice nucleation will occur. The temperature at which an insect spontaneously freezes is referred to as the supercooling point (SCP). For freeze-avoidant insects, the SCP is thought to be equivalent to the lower lethal temperature (LLT) of the organism.

The freezing process is usually initiated extracellularly in the gut, tissues, or hemolymph. In order to supercool to lower temperatures, freeze-avoidant insects will remove or inactivate ice-nucleating agents (INAs) such as food particles, dust particles, and bacteria, found in the gut or intracellular compartments of these organisms. Removal of ice-nucleating material from the gut can be achieved by cessation in feeding, clearing the gut, and removing lipoprotein ice nucleators (LPINs) from the haemolymph.

Freezing can also be initiated by external contact with ice (inoculative freezing). Thus, some insects avoid freezing by selecting a dry hibernation site in which no ice nucleation from an external source can occur. Insects may also have a physical barrier such as a wax-coated cuticle that provides protection against external ice across the cuticle. The stage of development at which an insect over-winters varies across species, but can occur at any point of the life cycle (i.e., egg, pupa, larva, and adult). Some species of Collembola tolerate extreme cold by the shedding of the mid-gut during moulting.

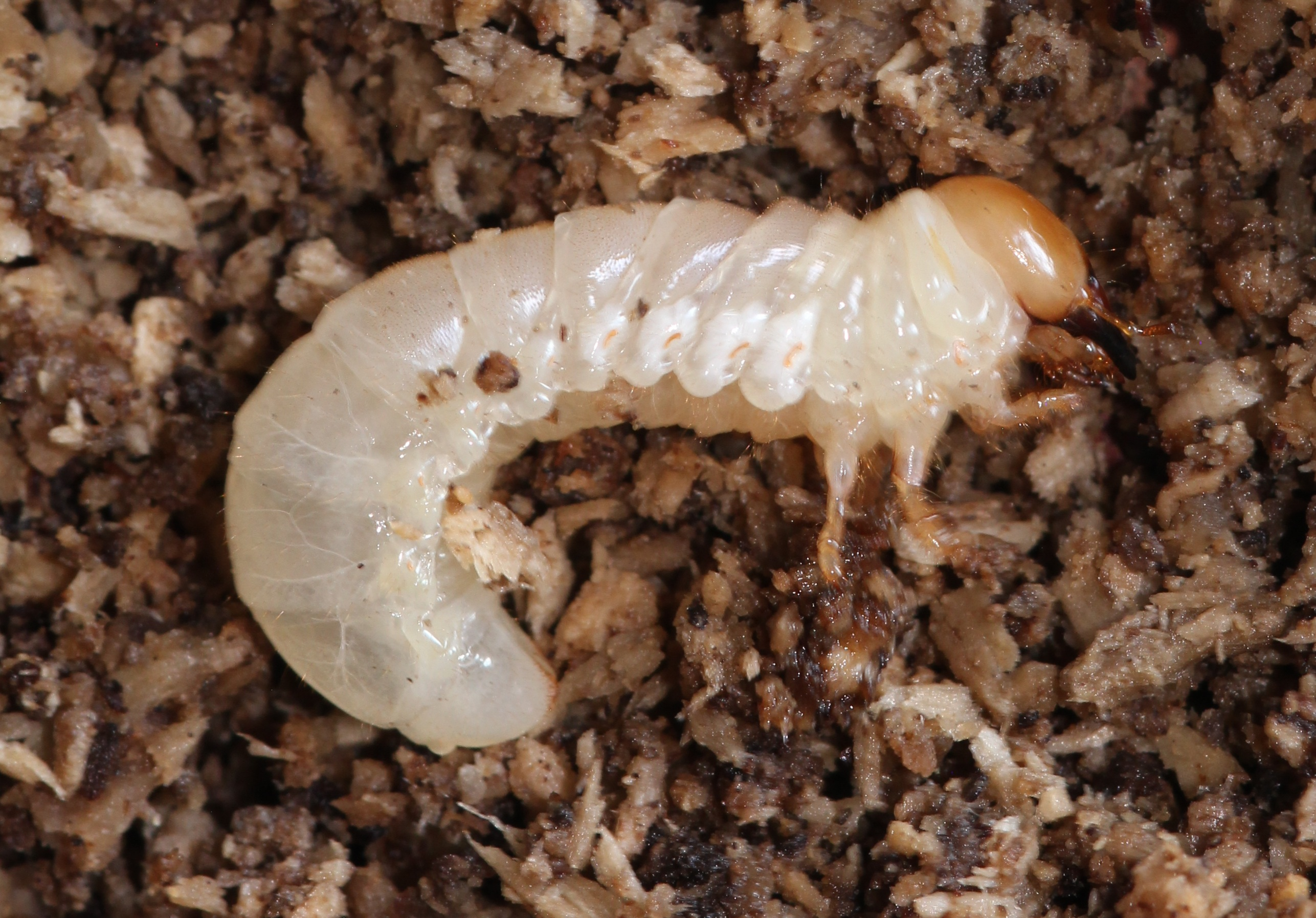
Overwintering lesser stag beetle larva

In addition to physical preparations for winter, many insects also alter their biochemistry and metabolism. For example, some insects synthesize cryoprotectants such as polyols and sugars, which reduce the whole body SCP. Although polyols such as sorbitol, mannitol, and ethylene glycol can also be found, glycerol is by far the most common cryoprotectant and can be equivalent to ~20% of the total body mass. Glycerol is distributed uniformly throughout the head, the thorax, and the abdomen of insects, and is in equal concentration in intracellular and extracellular compartments. The depressive effect of glycerol on the supercooling point is thought to be due to the high viscosity of glycerol solutions at low temperatures. This would inhibit INA activity and SCPs would drop far below the environmental temperature. At colder temperatures (below 0 °C), glycogen production is inhibited, and the breakdown of glycogen into glycerol is enhanced, resulting in the glycerol levels in freeze-avoidant insects reaching levels five times higher than those in freeze tolerant insects which do not need to cope with extended periods of cold temperatures.

Though not all freeze-avoidant insects produce polyols, all hibernating insects produce thermal hysteresis factors (THFs). For example, the haemolymph of the mealworm beetle Tenebrio molitor contains a family of such proteins. A seasonal photoperiodic timing mechanism is responsible for increasing the antifreeze protein levels with concentrations reaching their highest in the winter. In the pyrochroid beetle, Dendroides canadensis, a short photoperiod of 8 hours light and 16 hours of darkness, results in the highest levels of THFs, which corresponds with the shortening of daylight hours associated with winter. These antifreeze proteins are thought to stabilize SCPs by binding directly to the surface structures of the ice crystals themselves, diminishing crystal size and growth. Therefore, instead of acting to change the biochemistry of the bodily fluids as seen with cryoprotectants, THFs act directly with the ice crystals by adsorbing to the developing crystals to inhibit their growth and reduce the chance of lethal freezing occurring.

=== Freeze tolerance ===
Freeze tolerance in insects refers to the ability of some species to survive ice formation within their tissues. Insects that have evolved freeze-tolerance strategies manage to avoid tissue damage by controlling where, when, and to what extent ice forms. In contrast to freeze avoiding insects that are able to exist in cold conditions by supercooling, freeze-tolerant insects limit supercooling and initiate the freezing of their body fluids at relatively high temperatures. Some insects accomplish this through inoculative freezing, while others produce cryoprotectants to control the rate of ice formation. Freezing at higher temperatures is advantageous because the rate of ice formation is slower, allowing the insect time to adjust to the internal changes that result from ice formation.

Most freeze-tolerant species restrict ice formation to extracellular spaces, as intracellular ice formation is usually lethal. Some species, however, are able to tolerate intracellular freezing. This was first discovered in the fat body cells of the goldenrod gall fly Eurosta solidaginis. The fat body is an insect tissue that is important for lipid, protein and carbohydrate metabolism (analogous to the mammalian liver). Although it is not certain why intracellular freezing is restricted to the fat body tissue in some insects, there is evidence that it may be due to the low water content within fat body cells.

Although freeze-avoidance strategies predominate in the insects, freeze tolerance has evolved at least six times within this group (in the Lepidoptera, Blattodea, Diptera, Orthoptera, Coleoptera, and Hymenoptera). Examples of freeze tolerant insects include: the woolly bear, Pyrrharctia isabella; the flightless midge, Belgica antarctica; the alpine tree weta, Hemideina maori; and the alpine cockroach, Celatoblatta quinquemaculata.

Freeze tolerance is more prevalent in insects from the Southern Hemisphere (reported in 85% of species studied) than it is in insects from the Northern Hemisphere (reported in 29% of species studied). It has been suggested that this may be due to the Southern Hemisphere's greater climate variability, where insects must be able to survive sudden cold snaps yet take advantage of unseasonably warm weather as well. This is in contrast to the Northern Hemisphere, where predictable weather makes it more advantageous to overwinter after extensive seasonal cold hardening.

=== Ice nucleators ===
Freeze-tolerant insects are known to produce ice nucleating proteins. The regulated production of ice nucleating proteins allows insects to control the formation of ice crystals within their bodies. The lower an insect's body temperature, the more likely it is that ice will begin to form spontaneously. Even freeze-tolerant animals cannot tolerate a sudden, total freeze; for most freeze-tolerant insects it is important that they avoid supercooling and initiate ice formation at relatively warm temperatures. This allows the insect to moderate the rate of ice growth, adjust more slowly to the mechanical and osmotic pressures imposed by ice formation.

Nucleating proteins may be produced by the insect, or by microorganisms that have become associated with the insect's tissues. These microorganisms possess proteins within their cell walls that function as nuclei for ice growth.

The temperature that a particular ice nucleator initiates freezing varies from molecule to molecule. Although an organism may possess a number of different ice nucleating proteins, only those that initiate freezing at the highest temperature will catalyze an ice nucleation event. Once freezing is initiated, ice will spread throughout the insect's body.

=== Cryoprotectants ===
The formation of ice in the extracellular fluid causes an overall movement of water out of cells, a phenomenon known as osmosis. As too much dehydration can be dangerous to cells, many insects possess high concentrations of solutes such as glycerol. Glycerol is a relatively polar molecule and therefore attracts water molecules, shifting the osmotic balance and holding some water inside the cells. As a result, cryoprotectants like glycerol decrease the amount of ice that forms outside of cells and reduce cellular dehydration. Insect cryoprotectants are also important for species that avoid freezing; see description above.

== Locations of hibernating insects ==
Insects are well hidden in winter, but there are several locations in which they can reliably be found. Ladybugs practice communal hibernation by stacking one on top of one another on stumps and under rocks to share heat and buffer themselves against winter temperatures. The female long-horned grasshopper (family Tettigoniidae), in an attempt to keep her eggs safe through the winter, tunnels into the soil and deposits her eggs as deep as possible in the ground. Many other insects, including various butterflies and moths also overwinter in soil in the egg stage. Some adult beetles hibernate underground during winter; many flies overwinter in the soil as pupae. The western malaria mosquito overwinters as adults, traveling between multiple human structures throughout the winter. Other methods of hibernation include the inhabitance of bark, where insects nest more toward the southern side of the tree for heat provided by the sun. Cocoons, galls, and parasitism are also common methods of hibernation.

== Aquatic insects ==
Insects that live under the water have different strategies for dealing with freezing than terrestrial insects do. Many insect species survive winter not as adults on land, but as larvae underneath the surface of the water. Under the water many benthic invertebrates will experience some subfreezing temperatures, especially in small streams. Aquatic insects have developed freeze tolerance much like their terrestrial counterparts. However, freeze avoidance is not an option for aquatic insects as the presence of ice in their surroundings may cause ice nucleation in their tissues. Aquatic insects have supercooling points typically around −3º to −7 °C. In addition to using freeze tolerance, many aquatic insects migrate deeper into the water body where the temperatures are higher than at the surface. Insects such as stoneflies, mayflies, caddisflies, and dragonflies are common overwintering aquatic insects. The dance fly larvae have the lowest reported supercooling point for an aquatic insect at −22 °C.

== See also ==
- Cryobiology
- Overwinter
