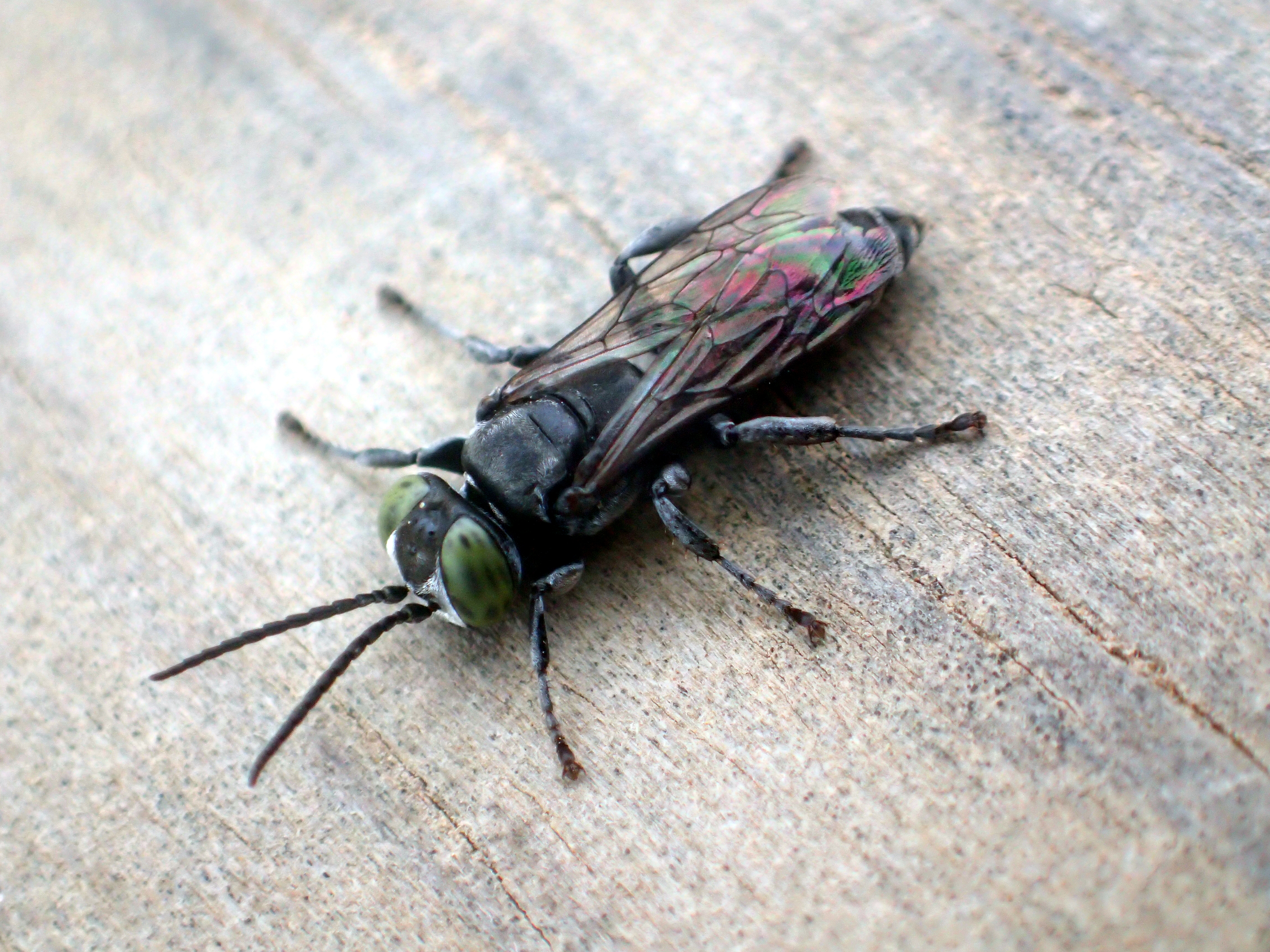

Scientific classification
- Kingdom: Animalia
- Phylum: Arthropoda
- Clade: Pancrustacea
- Class: Insecta
- Order: Hymenoptera
- Family: Crabronidae
- Genus: Tachysphex
- Species: T. nigerrimus

Binomial name
- Tachysphex nigerrimus (Smith, 1856)

Synonyms
- Tachytes sericops F.Smith, 1856; Tachysphex nigerrimus (F.Smith, 1856)

= Tachysphex nigerrimus =

Species of wasp

Tachysphex nigerrimus, also known as the black cockroach hunter, is a species of wasp in the family Crabronidae. It is endemic to New Zealand, the only species of Tachysphex that occurs there. It was nominated for New Zealand Bug of the Year in 2024, and came in 19th place of 20 contenders.

== Name ==
This species is known as the black cockroach-hunting wasp or black cockroach hunter in English, and in Māori as ngaro wīwī (written "ngaro wiwi", without macrons, in older sources). Ngaro is a generic Māori word for fly or wasp, and wīwī conveys walking to distant places (as in the phrase ki wīwī ki wāwā for going walkabout). This name is used for all the New Zealand hunting wasps in the families Eumenidae, Pompilidae, and Sphecidae, such as Pison spinolae and Priocnemis monachus.

== Taxonomy ==
The species was first described as Tachytes nigerrimus by Frederick Smith in 1856. The holotype is at the British Museum of Natural History.

== Behaviour ==
T. nigerrimus makes small, simple burrows in sand or in silty riverbanks above flood level, and can burrow into rock. The female T. nigerrimus hunts for native cockroaches (such as Celatoblatta or Parellipsidion), which she stings, paralysing them, and drags or flies them back to her burrow. The curved, white eggs of T. nigerrimus are 3.5 mm (0.14 in) long by 0.7 mm (0.028 in) wide and are laid on and cemented to the cockroach and the larval wasp eats it alive. Each larva is typically provisioned with three cockroaches.

== Distribution and habitat ==
T. nigerrimus is endemic to New Zealand and is found throughout the North, South and Stewart Islands.

== Gallery ==
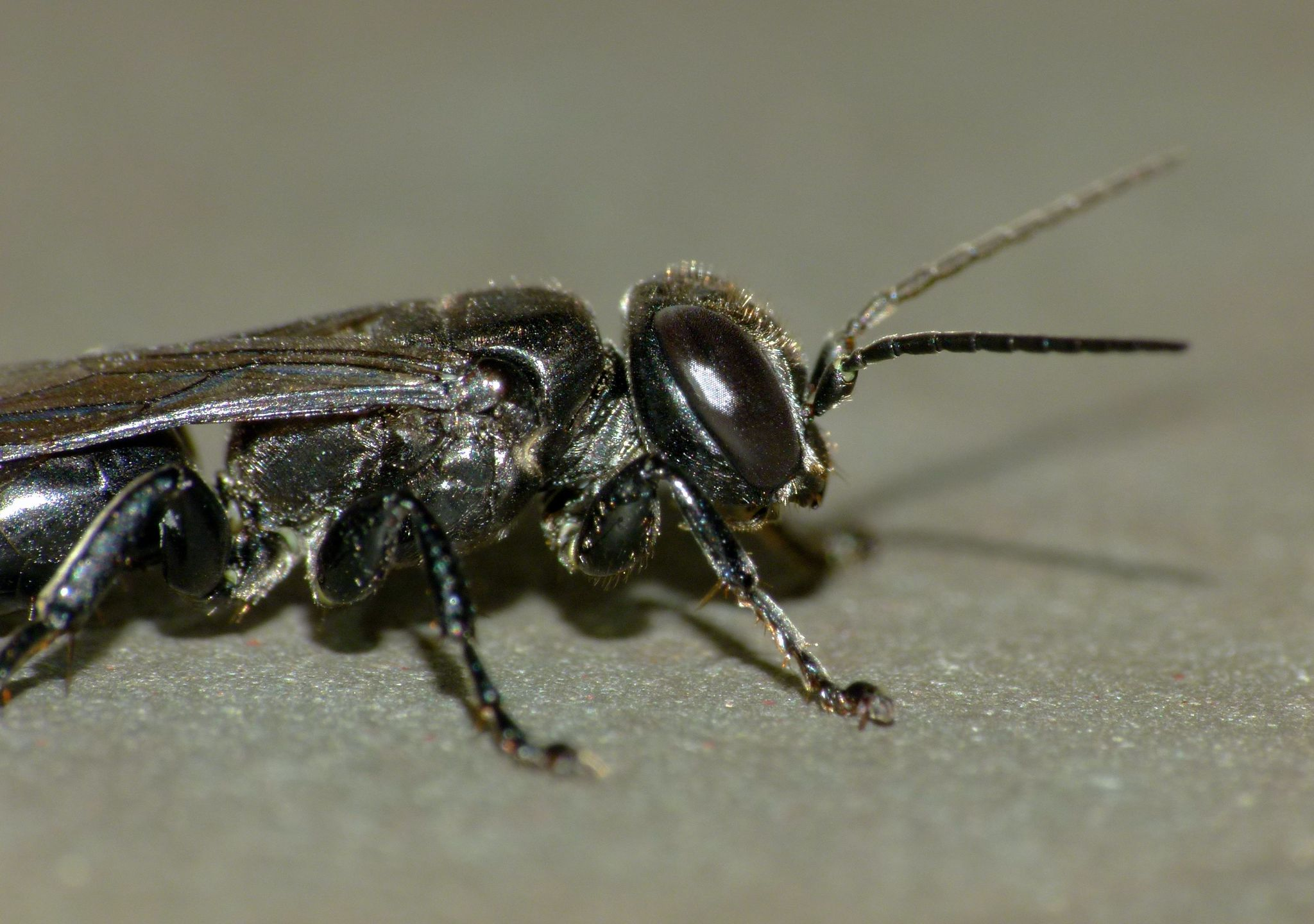
T. nigerrimus side view, close up, observed near Dunedin, New Zealand

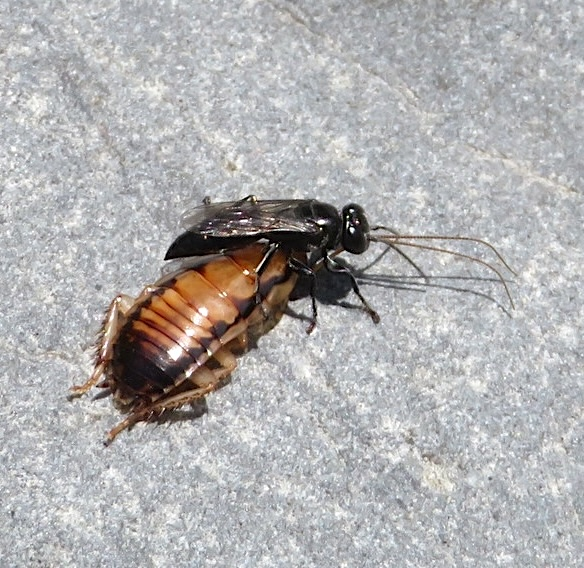
T. nigerrimus with paralysed cockroach

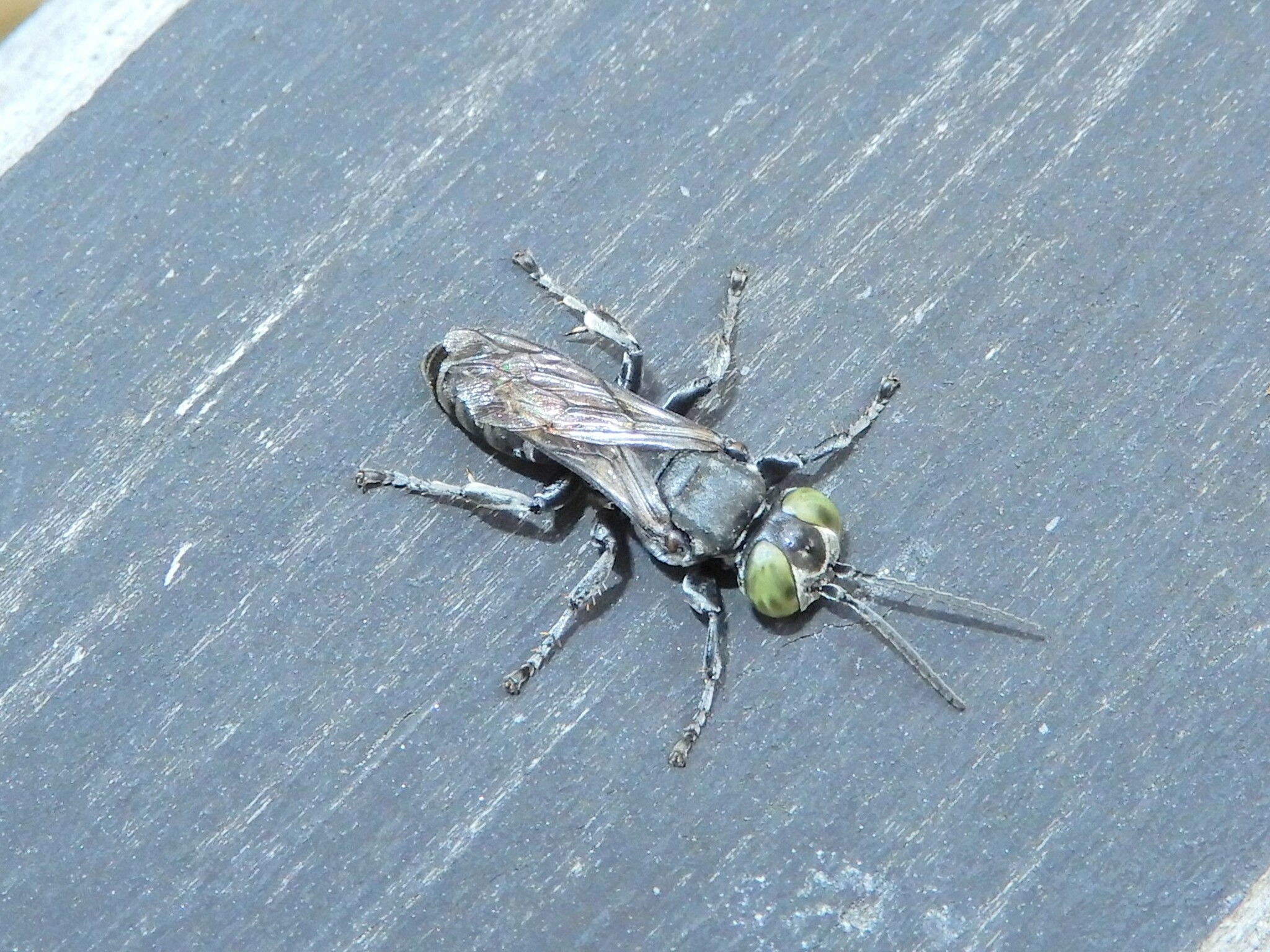
T. nigerrimus
