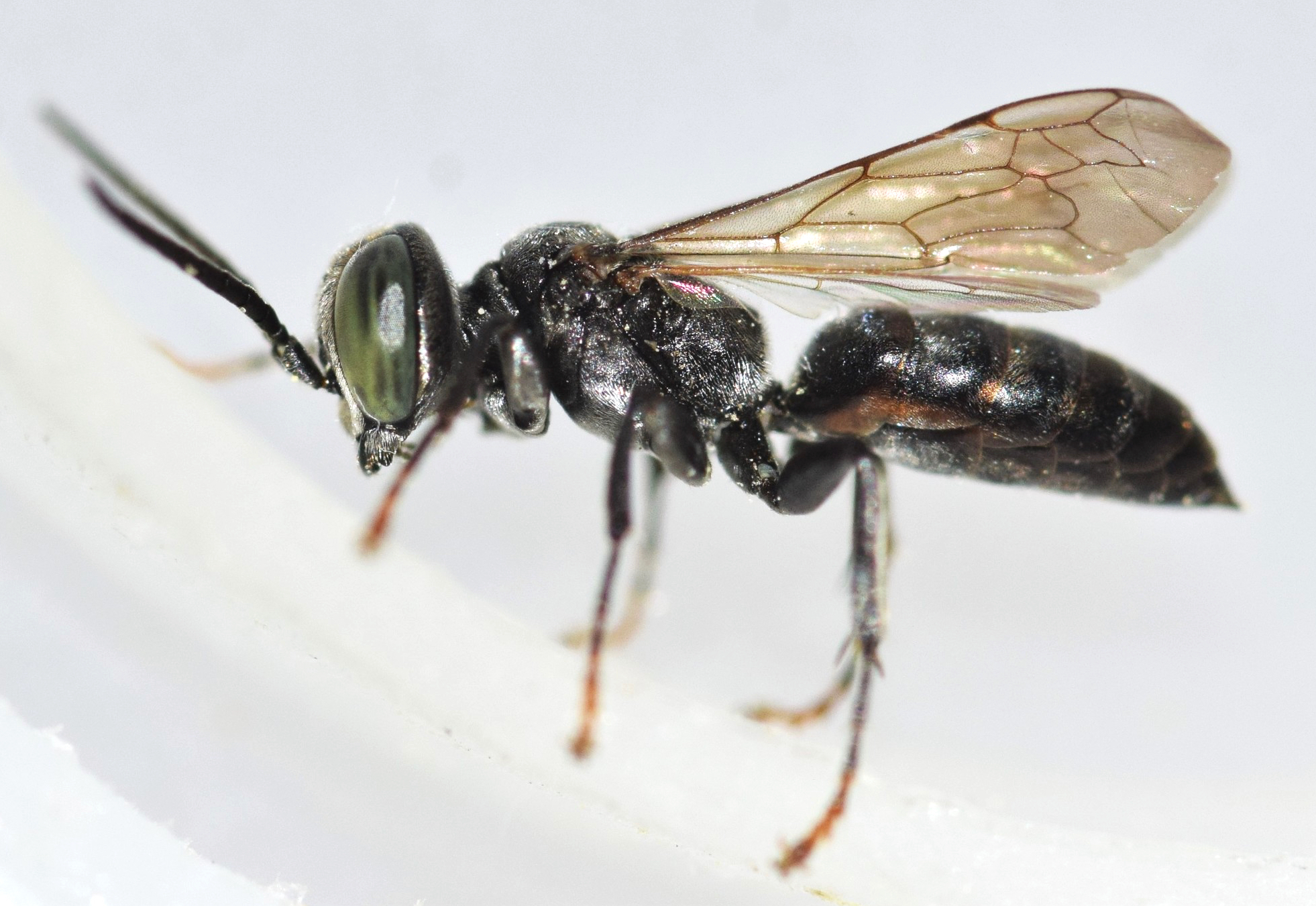

Conservation status
- Near Threatened (IUCN 2.3)

Scientific classification
- Kingdom: Animalia
- Phylum: Arthropoda
- Clade: Pancrustacea
- Class: Insecta
- Order: Hymenoptera
- Family: Crabronidae
- Genus: Tachysphex
- Species: T. pechumani

Binomial name
- Tachysphex pechumani Krombein, 1938

= Tachysphex pechumani =

Species of wasp

Tachysphex pechumani is a species of wasp in the family Crabronidae. It is endemic to North America.
