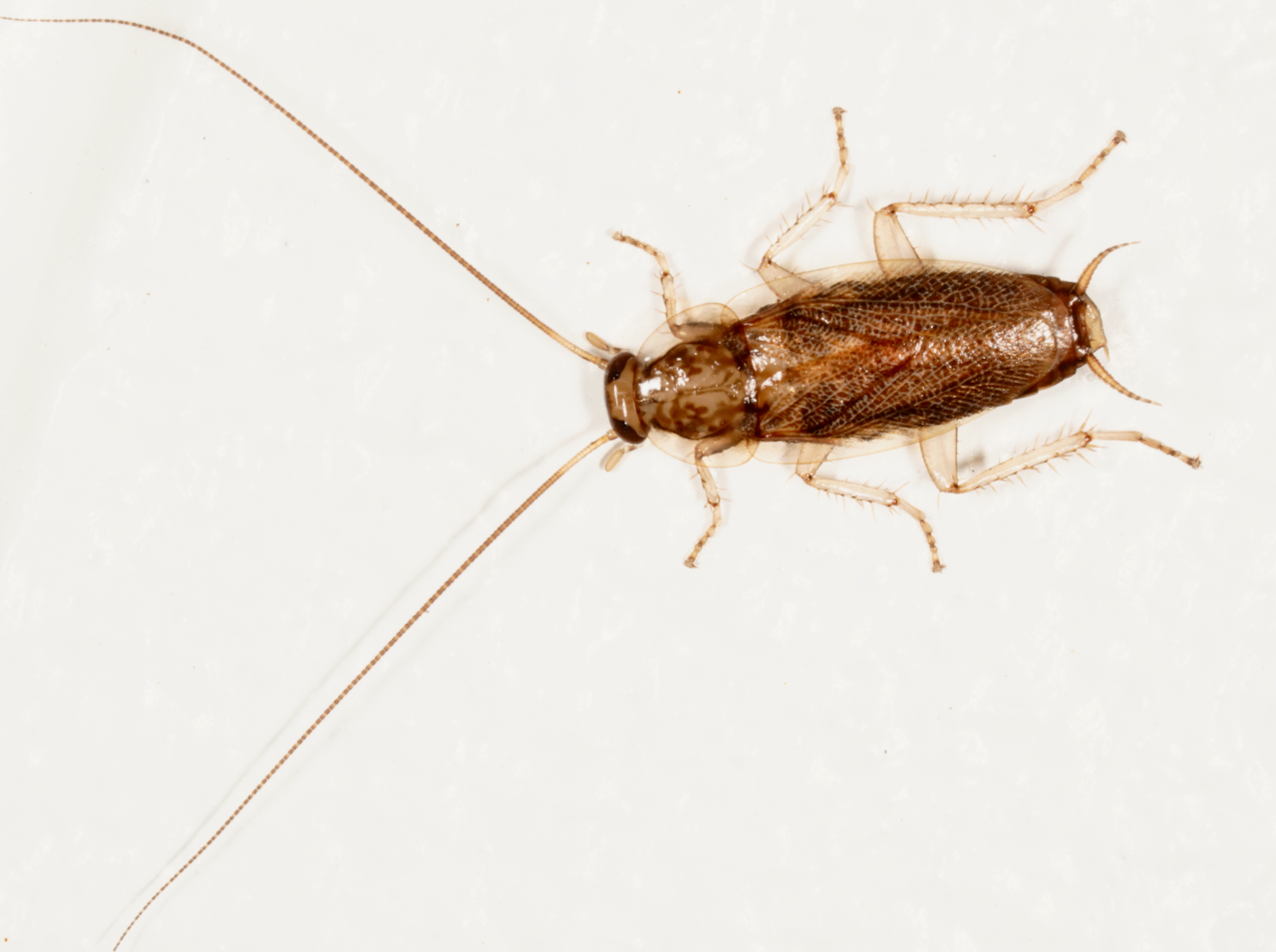
- Parellipsidion latipenne

Scientific classification
- Kingdom: Animalia
- Phylum: Arthropoda
- Clade: Pancrustacea
- Class: Insecta
- Order: Blattodea
- Family: Ectobiidae
- Genus: Parellipsidion; Johns, 1966
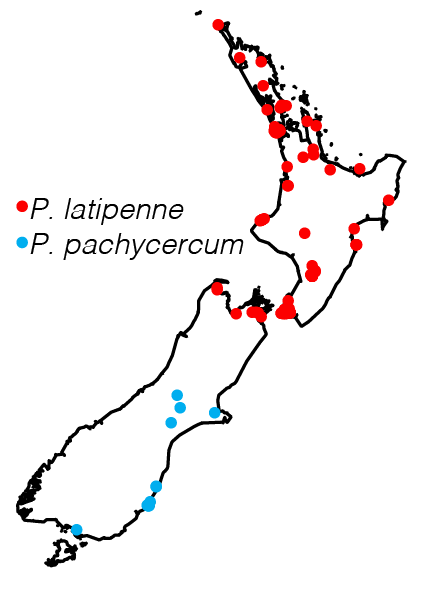
- Distribution based on iNaturalist RG observations 5 September 2025

= Parellipsidion =

Genus of cockroach

Parellipsidion is a genus of cockroaches endemic to New Zealand. There are three species within the genus Parellipsidion.

- Parellipsidion latipenne (Brunner von Wattenwyl, 1865)
- Parellipsidion inaculeatum Johns, 1966
- Parellipsidion pachycercum Johns, 1966

== Description ==
All species of Parellipsidion cockroach are small (7 - 14mm), brown and winged. Parellipsidion latipenne is fully winged. Parellipsidion pachycercum has short wings (Brachypterous) and brown body but the top of head and face are pale.

== Ecology ==
These cockroaches are nocturnal species. The low elevation species live in the forest and hide during the day under bark. The mountain species (P. inaculeatum) hides under rocks and in tussock grass above the tree line. Nymphs of Parellipsidion are caught by the wasp Tachysphex nigerrimus and put in egg chambers to feed their larvae.

== Taxonomy & etymology ==
The genus and two species were described by Peter Johns in 1966. The genus name derives from Ellipsidion and males of Parellipsidion are identified by their right style much reduced compared to the left. The species P. latipenne was first described as Phyllodromia latipennis in 1865 by the Swiss scientist Brunner von Wattenwyl. The genus name is considered neuter (applies to male or female) so the neuter ending is applied to the species name, hence Parellipsidion latipenne.
