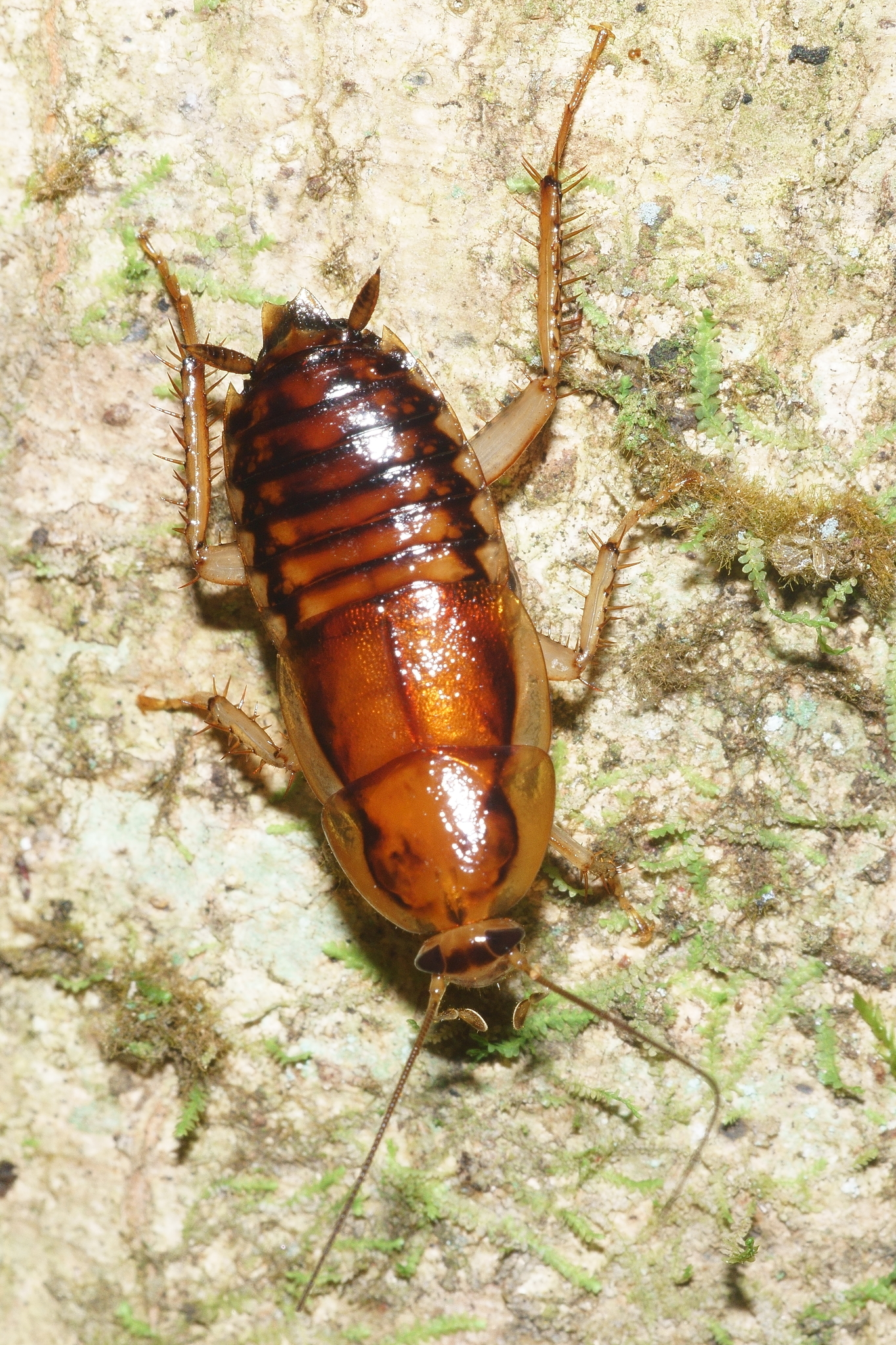
- Celatoblatta johnsi

Scientific classification
- Kingdom: Animalia
- Phylum: Arthropoda
- Clade: Pancrustacea
- Class: Insecta
- Order: Blattodea
- Family: Blattidae
- Subfamily: Polyzosteriinae
- Genus: Celatoblatta; Johns, 1966

= Celatoblatta =

Genus of cockroaches

Celatoblatta is a genus of cockroaches in the family Blattidae with species from Australia, New Zealand and New Caledonia. "Celato" means concealed and the members of this genus are all small, fast-moving nocturnal species that hide during the day under bark and rocks. In Australia the genus is known as hooded cockroaches, after the distinctive way the seventh abdominal tergite extends over the ninth and tenth like a hood.

The genus was created by Peter Johns in 1966 for New Zealand species, and Karlis Princis later added several species from Australia, New Guinea, and New Caledonia. Phylogenetic studies, however, suggested the resulting genus is not monophyletic, although the 14 New Zealand members of Celatoblatta as defined by Johns do form a monophyletic group sister to taxa in New Caledonia.

The New Zealand Celatoblatta are all flightless with short or very short tegmina. They have 7 or 8 instars, with overlapping generations and eggs laid all year. Eggs are laid in brown capsules called oothecae which protect the 10–14 developing nymphs. Most New Zealand Celatoblatta species live in native forest, but four prefer high elevations above the tree line. Australian species are mostly restricted to Queensland, and are generally shiny black with small tegmina and wings. New Zealand species are generally brown with lighter patches on the thorax, although colour is often variable within a species.

The Otago alpine cockroach Celatoblatta quinquemaculata has been the subject of many studies due to its ability to survive freezing down to -9 °C and it is one of the few species where intercellular freezing is thought to allow ice crystals to reach beyond the gut to the haemolymph.

Celatoblatta currently contains the following species:

- Celatoblatta anisoptera Johns, 1966 – New Zealand
- Celatoblatta brunni Johns, 1966 – Chatham Islands
- Celatoblatta fuscipes Johns, 1966 – New Zealand
- Celatoblatta hesperia Johns, 1966 – New Zealand
- Celatoblatta johnsi Morgan-Richards & Trewick, 2026 – New Zealand
- Celatoblatta laevispinata Johns, 1966 – New Zealand
- Celatoblatta montana Johns, 1966 – New Zealand
- Celatoblatta nigrifrons (Chopard, 1924) – New Caledonia
- Celatoblatta notialis Johns, 1966 – New Zealand
- Celatoblatta pallidicauda Johns, 1966 – New Zealand
- Celatoblatta papuae (Shaw, 1925) – New Guinea, Solomon Islands
- Celatoblatta pata Morgan-Richards & Trewick, 2026 – New Zealand
- Celatoblatta peninsularis Johns, 1966 – New Zealand
- Celatoblatta perpolita (Mackerras, 1968) – Queensland
- Celatoblatta punctipennis (Chopard, 1924) – New Caledonia
- Celatoblatta quinquemaculata Johns, 1966 – New Zealand
- Celatoblatta sedilloti (Bolívar, 1883) – New Zealand
- Celatoblatta shawi (Princis, 1966) – Queensland
- Celatoblatta subcorticaria Johns, 1966 – New Zealand
- Celatoblatta tryoni (Shaw, 1925) – Queensland
- Celatoblatta undulivitta (Walker, 1868) – New Zealand
- Celatoblatta vulgaris Johns, 1966 – New Zealand
- Celatoblatta zonata (Princis, 1954) – Australia

In a 2022 revision of the group Celatoblatta was moved to the subfamily Polyzosteriinae; Celatoblatta shelfordi (Shaw, 1925), C. quadriloba (Mackerras, 1968), C. immunda (Shelford, 1911) and C. baldwinspenceri (Mackerras, 1968) were assigned to the genus Austrostylopyga, which was resurrected after being previously synonymised with Celatoblatta; and C. marksae (Mackerras, 1968) was moved back to Temnelytra. The New Caledonian species are more closely related to Polyzostera than to New Zealand Celatoblatta species.
