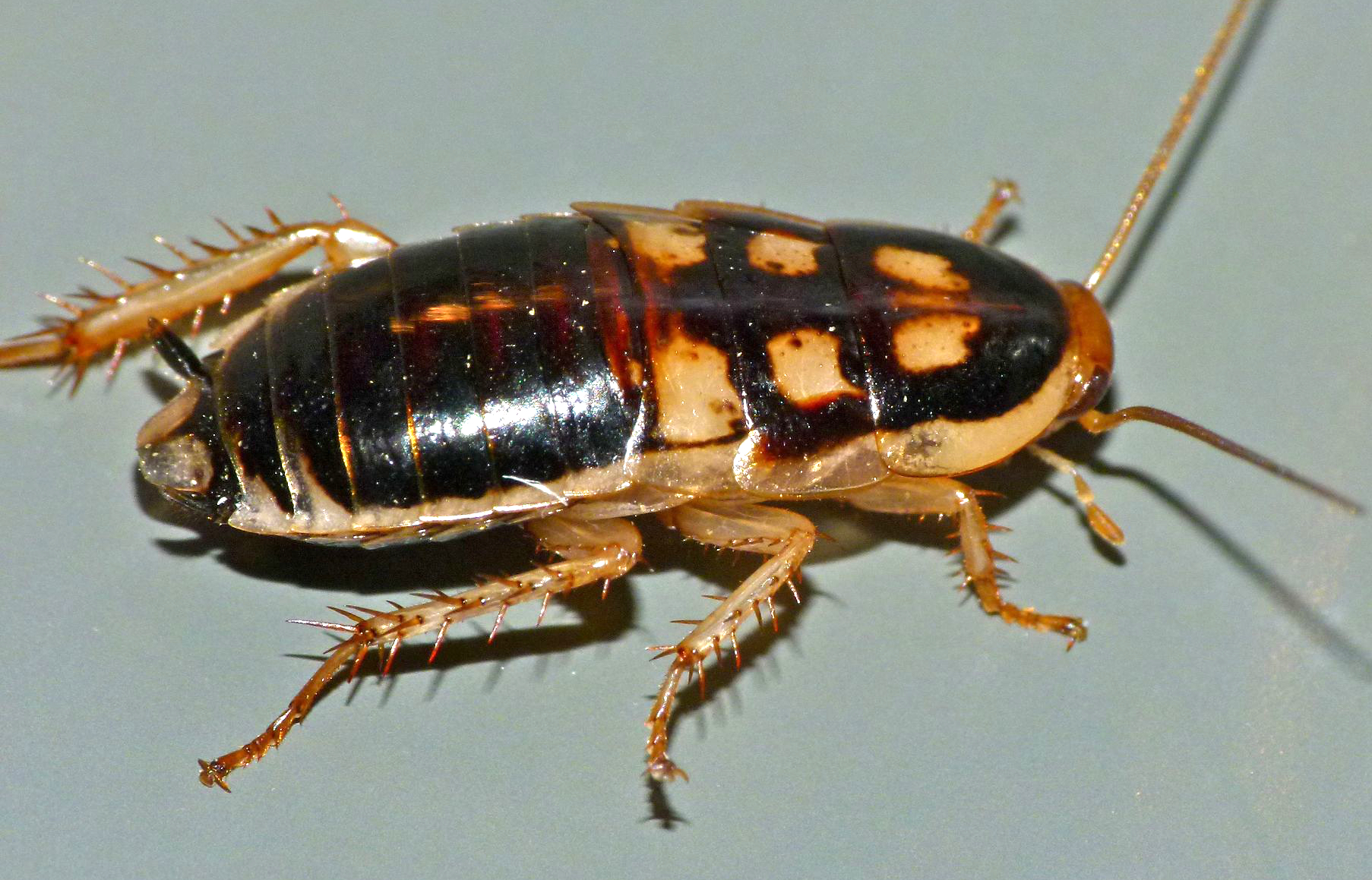

Scientific classification
- Domain: Eukaryota
- Kingdom: Animalia
- Phylum: Arthropoda
- Class: Insecta
- Order: Blattodea
- Family: Blattidae
- Genus: Celatoblatta
- Species: C. quinquemaculata

Binomial name
- Celatoblatta quinquemaculata (Johns, 1966)

= Celatoblatta quinquemaculata =

Otago alpine cockroach

Species of cockroach

Celatoblatta quinquemaculata, the Otago alpine cockroach, is a species of blattid cockroach endemic to New Zealand.

== Taxonomy ==
Celatoblatta quinquemaculata was described in 1966 by entomologist Peter Johns in his revision of the New Zealand cockroaches. Its name quinquemaculata refers to the five distinctive spots on its thorax. The holotype in Canterbury Museum was collected in 1964 in the Old Man Range, Central Otago between 1,300 m (4,200 ft) and 1,400 m (4,700 ft). The Otago alpine cockroach is sister to the subalpine Canterbury species Celatoblatta anisoptera.

== Description ==
This species is from 13 to 15 mm long, wingless, and dark brown in colour except for distinctive pale brown patches. The pronotum of the thorax has a single pale brown patch with a darker stripe down the middle (so it resembles two patches), and the mesonotum and metanotum each have two pale brown patches, making five in all. The thorax and upper abdomen also have pale brown margins, as do parts of the insect's head (frons, clypeus, and labrum). Adults have small tegmina separated by more than half the mesonatal width.

== Distribution ==
Found only in New Zealand, this species is restricted to the alpine zone of mountains in Central Otago. It has been recorded from the Old Man Range, Rock and Pillar Range, the Routeburn Valley, Lake Mackenzie, and in Fiordland National Park. It occurs above 1,300 m (4,300 ft) and is common at an altitude of 1,500 m (4,900 ft).

== Habitat and resistance to freezing ==
Living under slabs of schist in an alpine and subalpine habitat, C. quinquemaculata is regularly exposed to temperatures below freezing. At anytime of the year this cockroach can survive freezing solid, and during the winter probably freezes and thaws more than 20 times a month. It has moderate freeze tolerance: its body water freezes at −4.2 °C in the autumn and −3.4 °C in the winter, and it can survive up to 4 days frozen at −5 °C, but dies at about −9 °C.
