= Peter Johns (entomologist) =

New Zealand entomologist

Peter Malcolm Johns
- Born: 3 June 1935 (age 91); Wanganui, New Zealand
- Education: University of Canterbury
- Scientific career
- Fields: Entomology

Peter Malcolm Johns (born 3 June 1935) is a New Zealand entomologist and taxonomist who has made significant contributions to the field of entomology. He is a leading expert in various groups, including cockroaches, craneflies, wētā and millipedes.

== Early life ==
Born in Wanganui, he is the second son of Malcolm Johns, a surveyor and Hattie Johns, a research assistant. He was educated at Wanganui East Primary School and Wanganui Collegiate School. Johns started attending the University of Canterbury in 1953, majoring in chemistry and zoology. He gained a masters degree in Zoology with a thesis focused on snakeskin chiton.

== Career ==
Johns began lecturing in Zoology at the University of Canterbury in 1959 at the age of 24, and was appointed to a permanent position in 1964 as an assistant lecturer and later as lecturer. Over his 57 year career, Johns interest slowly shifted towards terrestrial invertebrates, eventually amassing a large collection of 140,000 specimens held at Canterbury Museum.

Johns is currently a research fellow at Canterbury Museum and a Fellow of the Entomological Society of New Zealand.

== Taxa named by Johns ==
- Celatoblatta (1966)
- Celeriblattina (1966)
- Parellipsidion (1966)
- Ornatiblatta (1966)
- Eumastigonus hallelujah (2009)
- Eumastigonus waitahae (2009)
- Motuweta isolata (1997)
- Transaevum laudatum (1997)
- Maotoweta virescens (2014)

== Taxa named in Johns' honour ==
- Cantuaria johnsi (Forster, 1968)
- Meropathus johnsi (Ordish, 1971)
- Campbellonemertes johnsi (Moore & Gibson, 1972)
- Parisolabis johnsi (Hudson, 1975)
- Nesoperla johnsi (McLellan, 1977)
- Hydrobiosis johnsi (McFarlane, 1981)
- Peterjohnsiidae (Mauriès, 1987)
- Mimopeus johnsi (Watt, 1988)
- Parentia johnsi (Bickel, 1992)
- Kupeharpalus johnsi (Larochelle & Larivière, 2005)
- Lissodesmus johnsi (Mesibov, 2006)
- Nothotrichocera johnsi (Krzeminska, 2006)
- Zalea johnsi (McAlpine, 2007)
- Agathodesmus johnsi (Mesibov, 2009)
- Hemiandrus johnsi Trewick & Morgan-Richards, 2026
- Celatoblatta johnsi Morgan-Richards & Trewick, 2026

== Selected works ==
- Johns, P. M. (1962). "Introduction to the endemic and introduced millipedes of New Zealand." New Zealand Entomologist 3(1): 38-46.
- Johns, P. M. (1964). "Insects of Campbell Island. Chilopoda, Diplopoda (preliminary note on the Myriapoda of the New Zealand subantarctic islands)." Pacific Insects Monograph 7: 170-172.
