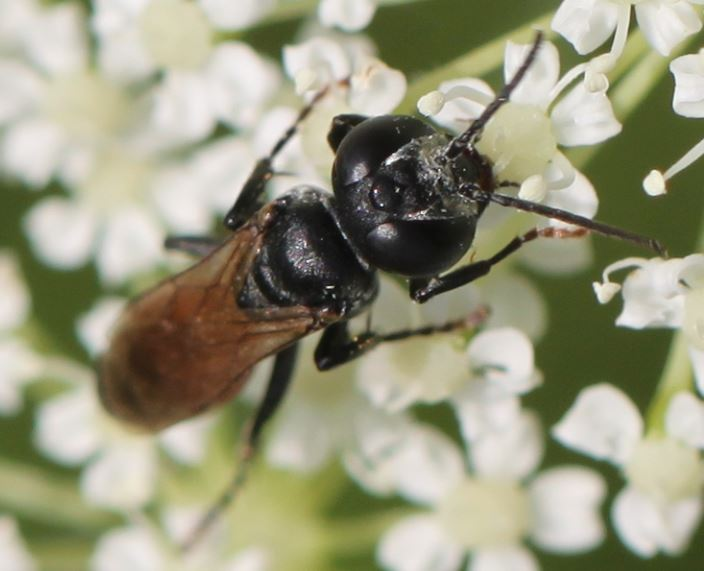
- Tachysphex cf. pompiliformis

Scientific classification
- Kingdom: Animalia
- Phylum: Arthropoda
- Class: Insecta
- Order: Hymenoptera
- Family: Crabronidae
- Subfamily: Crabroninae
- Tribe: Larrini
- Subtribe: Gastrosericina
- Genus: Tachysphex; Kohl, 1883

Diversity
- at least 450 species

Synonyms
- Atelosphex Arnold, 1922; Schistosphex Arnold, 1923

= Tachysphex =

Genus of wasps

Tachysphex is a genus of square-headed wasps in the family Crabronidae. There are over 450 described species in Tachysphex.

== See also ==
- List of Tachysphex species
