= List of Tachytes species =

This is a list of 300 species in Tachytes, a genus of square-headed wasps in the family Crabronidae.

== Tachytes species ==
- Tachytes abdominalis (Say, 1823)^{i c g b}
- Tachytes abercornensis Arnold, 1959^{i c g}
- Tachytes absidatus R. Bohart, 1979^{i c g}
- Tachytes admirabilis R. Turner, 1916^{i c g}
- Tachytes aeneus E. Saunders, 1910^{i c g}
- Tachytes aestuans R. Turner, 1916^{i c g}
- Tachytes agadiriensis Nadig, 1933^{i c g}
- Tachytes alacer Arnold, 1960^{i c g}
- Tachytes albonotatus Walker, 1871^{i c g}
- Tachytes alfierii Pulawski, 1962^{i c g}
- Tachytes alvarengai R. Bohart, 1979^{i c g}
- Tachytes amazonus F. Smith, 1856^{i c g}
- Tachytes ambidens Kohl, 1884^{i c}
- Tachytes andesae R. Bohart, 1979^{i c g}
- Tachytes andreniformis Cameron, 1889^{i c g}
- Tachytes angustiverticis Wu and Li, 2006^{i c g}
- Tachytes approximatus R. Turner, 1908^{i c g}
- Tachytes arabicus Guichard, 1994^{i c g}
- Tachytes archaeophilus Pulawski, 1962^{i c g}
- Tachytes argentea Gussakovskij, 1933^{c g}
- Tachytes argenteovestitus Cameron, 1910^{i c g}
- Tachytes argenteus Gussakovskij, 1933^{i}
- Tachytes argyreus (F. Smith, 1856)^{i c g}
- Tachytes argyropis de Saussure, 1887^{i c g}
- Tachytes asiagenes Pulawski, 1962^{i c g}
- Tachytes assamensis Cameron, 1904^{i c g}
- Tachytes associatus R. Turner, 1917^{i c g}
- Tachytes astutus Nurse, 1909^{i c g}
- Tachytes aureocinctus Cameron, 1905^{i c g}
- Tachytes aurichalceus Kohl in Schletterer, 1891^{i c g}
- Tachytes auricomans Bradley, 1919^{i c g}
- Tachytes aurifex F. Smith, 1858^{i c g}
- Tachytes auripes Berland, 1942^{i c g}
- Tachytes aurovestitus F. Smith, 1873^{i c g}
- Tachytes aurulentus (Fabricius, 1804)^{i c g b}
- Tachytes badius Banks, 1942^{i c g}
- Tachytes bakeri Williams, 1928^{i c g}
- Tachytes basilicus (Guérin-Méneville, 1844)^{i c g}
- Tachytes beludzhistanicus Gussakovskij, 1933^{i c g}
- Tachytes bidens Gussakovskij, 1952^{i c g}
- Tachytes bilunaris Tsuneki, 1982^{i c g}
- Tachytes bimetallicus R. Turner, 1917^{i c g}
- Tachytes birkmanni Rohwer, 1909^{i c g}
- Tachytes biskrensis E. Saunders, 1910^{i c g}
- Tachytes braunsi R. Turner, 1917^{i c g}
- Tachytes bredoi Arnold, 1947^{i c g}
- Tachytes brevicornis Tsuneki, 1976^{i c g}
- Tachytes brevipennis Cameron, 1900^{i c g}
- Tachytes brevis Walker, 1871^{i c g}
- Tachytes brunneomarginatus Arnold, 1947^{i c g}
- Tachytes brunneus Pulawski, 1962^{i c g}
- Tachytes bulawayoensis Bischoff, 1913^{i c g}
- Tachytes californicus R. Bohart, 1962^{i c g}
- Tachytes cameronianus Morice, 1897^{i c g}
- Tachytes carinatus Berland, 1942^{i c g}
- Tachytes catamarcae R. Bohart, 1979^{i c g}
- Tachytes cataractae Arnold, 1923^{i c g}
- Tachytes catarinae R. Bohart, 1979^{i c g}
- Tachytes celsissimus R. Turner, 1917^{i c g}
- Tachytes cephalotes Walker, 1871^{i c g}
- Tachytes ceratophorus Pulawski, 1962^{i c g}
- Tachytes chelatus R. Bohart, 1962^{i c g}
- Tachytes chilensis (Spinola, 1851)^{i c g}
- Tachytes chivensis Pulawski, 1962^{i c g}
- Tachytes chrysocercus Rohwer, 1911^{i c g}
- Tachytes chrysopyga (Spinola, 1842)^{i c g}
- Tachytes chudeaui Berland, 1942^{i c g}
- Tachytes cinerascens Arnold, 1935^{i c g}
- Tachytes codonocarpi Pulawski, 1975^{i c g}
- Tachytes coloratus R. Bohart, 1979^{i c g}
- Tachytes columbiae W. Fox, 1892^{i c g}
- Tachytes comberi R. Turner, 1917^{i c g}
- Tachytes compactus Arnold, 1951^{i c g}
- Tachytes concinnus F. Smith, 1856^{i c g}
- Tachytes confusus Arnold, 1923^{i c g}
- Tachytes contractus Walker, 1871^{i c g}
- Tachytes copiosus Arnold, 1945^{i c g}
- Tachytes corniger Gussakovskij, 1952^{i c g}
- Tachytes costalis Taschenberg, 1870^{i c g}
- Tachytes crassus Patton, 1880^{i c g b}
- Tachytes cressoni Banks, 1942^{i c g}
- Tachytes danae Arnold, 1923^{i c g}
- Tachytes decoratus Walker, 1871^{i c g}
- Tachytes desertus R. Bohart, 1994^{i c g b}
- Tachytes dichrous F. Smith, 1856^{i c g}
- Tachytes dilaticornis R. Turner, 1916^{i c g}
- Tachytes dilwara Nurse, 1903^{i c g}
- Tachytes diodontus Pulawski, 1962^{i c g}
- Tachytes discrepans Arnold, 1951^{i c g}
- Tachytes dispersus R. Turner, 1916^{i c g}
- Tachytes disputabilis R. Turner, 1917^{i c g}
- Tachytes distanti R. Turner, 1917^{i c g}
- Tachytes distinctus F. Smith, 1856^{i c g b}
- Tachytes dogon Pulawski, 2006^{i c g}
- Tachytes dubiosus Tsuneki, 1974^{i c g}
- Tachytes ermineus Banks, 1942^{i c g}
- Tachytes erynnis R. Turner, 1917^{i c g}
- Tachytes etruscus (Rossi, 1790)^{i c g}
- Tachytes excellens Cameron, 1912^{i c g}
- Tachytes exclusus R. Turner, 1917^{i c g}
- Tachytes exornatus W. Fox, 1894^{i c g}
- Tachytes famelicus Pulawski, 1962^{i c g}
- Tachytes fatalis R. Turner, 1916^{i c g}
- Tachytes fervidus F. Smith, 1856^{i c g}
- Tachytes fidelis Pulawski, 1962^{i c g}
- Tachytes flagellarius R. Bohart, 1979^{i c g}
- Tachytes flagellatus Nurse, 1903^{i c g}
- Tachytes flavocinereus Arnold, 1945^{i c g}
- Tachytes floridanus Rohwer, 1920^{i c g}
- Tachytes formosissimus R. Turner, 1908^{i c g}
- Tachytes fraternoides R. Bohart, 1979^{i c g}
- Tachytes fraternus Taschenberg, 1870^{i c g}
- Tachytes freygessneri Kohl, 1881^{i c g}
- Tachytes fritzi R. Bohart, 1979^{i c g}
- Tachytes frontalis F. Smith, 1873^{i c g}
- Tachytes fruticis Tsuneki, 1964^{i c g}
- Tachytes fucatus Arnold, 1951^{i c g}
- Tachytes fulviventris Cresson, 1865^{i c g}
- Tachytes fulvovestitus Cameron, 1904^{i c g}
- Tachytes gondarabai (Guiglia, 1943)^{i c g}
- Tachytes gracilicornis Arnold, 1944^{i c g}
- Tachytes grisselli R. Bohart, 1994^{i c g b}
- Tachytes guatemalensis Cameron, 1889^{i c g b}
- Tachytes gyusanus Back and Kim, 2014^{i g}
- Tachytes habilis R. Turner, 1917^{i c g}
- Tachytes hades Schrottky, 1903^{i c g}
- Tachytes hainanensis Wu and Q. Li, 2006^{i c g}
- Tachytes hamiltoni R. Turner, 1917^{i c g}
- Tachytes harpax Patton, 1880^{i c g}
- Tachytes hirsutus F. Smith, 1856^{i c g}
- Tachytes illabefactus Pulawski, 1962^{i c g}
- Tachytes imperialis de Saussure, 1867^{i c g}
- Tachytes indicus Dalla Torre, 1897^{i c g}
- Tachytes indifferens Arnold, 1945^{i c g}
- Tachytes indulgens Cheesman, 1937^{i c g}
- Tachytes inexorabilis R. Turner, 1917^{i c g}
- Tachytes instabilis R. Turner, 1917^{i c g}
- Tachytes integer Gussakovskij, 1933^{i c g}
- Tachytes intermedius (Viereck, 1906)^{i c g b}
- Tachytes interstitialis Cameron, 1900^{i c g}
- Tachytes irreverens Cheesman, 1937^{i c g}
- Tachytes irritabilis R. Turner, 1917^{i c g}
- Tachytes jucundus F. Smith, 1856^{i c g}
- Tachytes kristenseni R. Turner, 1917^{i c g}
- Tachytes labilis R. Turner, 1917^{i c g}
- Tachytes lachesis R. Turner, 1917^{i c g}
- Tachytes lamborni Arnold, 1934^{i c g}
- Tachytes lamentabilis Arnold, 1951^{i c g}
- Tachytes lanuginosus Pulawski, 1962^{i c g}
- Tachytes latifrons Tsuneki, 1964^{i c g}
- Tachytes lepidus Arnold, 1929^{i c g}
- Tachytes leprieuri (Spinola, 1842)^{c g}
- Tachytes leprieurii (Spinola, 1842)^{i}
- Tachytes levantinus Pulawski, 1962^{i c g}
- Tachytes lingnaui Arnold, 1933^{i c g}
- Tachytes lissinus R. Bohart, 1979^{i c g}
- Tachytes longirostris Arnold, 1947^{i c g}
- Tachytes lugubris Walker, 1871^{i c g}
- Tachytes maculicornis E. Saunders, 1910^{i c g}
- Tachytes maerens R. Turner, 1917^{i c g}
- Tachytes magellanicus Williams, 1928^{i c g}
- Tachytes maindroni Berland, 1942^{i c g}
- Tachytes manjikuli Tsuneki, 1963^{i c g}
- Tachytes maroccanus Pulawski, 1962^{i c g}
- Tachytes marshalli R. Turner, 1912^{i c g}
- Tachytes matronalis Dahlbom, 1845^{i c g}
- Tachytes megaera R. Turner, 1917^{i c g}
- Tachytes melancholicus Arnold, 1923^{i c g}
- Tachytes memnon R. Turner, 1916^{i c g}
- Tachytes menkei R. Bohart, 1979^{i c g}
- Tachytes meraukensis Cameron, 1911^{i c g}
- Tachytes mergus W. Fox, 1892^{i c g}
- Tachytes micantipygus Strand, 1910^{i c g}
- Tachytes midas Arnold, 1929^{i c g}
- Tachytes minutior R. Bohart, 1979^{i c g}
- Tachytes mirus Kohl, 1894^{i c g}
- Tachytes mitis R. Turner, 1916^{i c g}
- Tachytes modestus F. Smith, 1856^{i c g}
- Tachytes monetarius F. Smith, 1856^{i c g}
- Tachytes mongolicus Tsuneki, 1972^{i c g}
- Tachytes mutilloides Walker, 1871^{i c g}
- Tachytes nasicornis Gussakovskij, 1952^{i c g}
- Tachytes natalensis de Saussure, 1854^{i c g}
- Tachytes nevadensis R. Bohart, 1962^{i c g}
- Tachytes nigrescens Berland, 1942^{i c g}
- Tachytes nigroannulatus Bischoff, 1913^{i c g}
- Tachytes nigropilosellus (Cameron, 1910)^{i c g}
- Tachytes niloticus R. Turner, 1918^{i c g}
- Tachytes nitidiusculus (F. Smith, 1856)^{i c g}
- Tachytes nitidulus (Fabricius, 1793)^{i c g}
- Tachytes nomarches Pulawski, 1962^{i c g}
- Tachytes notabilis R. Turner, 1917^{i c g}
- Tachytes nudiventris R. Turner, 1917^{i c g}
- Tachytes obductus W. Fox, 1892^{i c g}
- Tachytes observabilis Kohl, 1894^{i c g}
- Tachytes obsoletus (Rossi, 1792)^{i c g}
- Tachytes oppositus R. Turner, 1917^{i c g}
- Tachytes opulentus Nurse, 1909^{i c g}
- Tachytes ornatipes Cameron, 1889^{i c g}
- Tachytes oviventris de Saussure, 1891^{i c g}
- Tachytes palatus R. Bohart, 1979^{i c g}
- Tachytes pallidiventris Arnold, 1947^{i c g}
- Tachytes panzeri (Dufour, 1841)^{i c g}
- Tachytes papuanus Tsuneki, 1983^{i c g}
- Tachytes parvus W. Fox, 1892^{i c g}
- Tachytes pennsylvanica Banks, 1921^{c g}
- Tachytes pennsylvanicus Banks, 1921^{i b}
- Tachytes pepticus (Say, 1837)^{i c g}
- Tachytes perornatus R. Turner, 1917^{i c g}
- Tachytes picticornis Arnold, 1945^{i c g}
- Tachytes plagiatus Walker, 1871^{i c g}
- Tachytes plutocraticus R. Turner, 1910^{i c g}
- Tachytes politus R. Bohart, 1979^{i c g}
- Tachytes popovi Pulawski, 1962^{i c g}
- Tachytes praedator W. Fox, 1892^{i c g}
- Tachytes praestabilis R. Turner, 1917^{i c g}
- Tachytes pretiosus Cameron, 1912^{i c g}
- Tachytes priesneri Pulawski, 1962^{i c g}
- Tachytes procerus A. Costa, 1882^{i c g}
- Tachytes pubescens R. Bohart, 1979^{i c g}
- Tachytes pulchricornis R. Turner, 1917^{i c g}
- Tachytes punctuosus Arnold, 1923^{i c g}
- Tachytes pygmaeus Kohl, 1888^{i c g}
- Tachytes quinquedens R. Bohart, 1979^{i c g}
- Tachytes rarus Arnold, 1960^{i c g}
- Tachytes relucens R. Turner, 1916^{i c g}
- Tachytes repandus (Fabricius, 1787)^{i c g}
- Tachytes rhodesianus Bischoff, 1913^{i c g}
- Tachytes rhododactylus Taschenberg, 1870^{i c g}
- Tachytes rhodogaster R. Bohart, 1979^{i c g}
- Tachytes richardsi R. Bohart, 1979^{i c g}
- Tachytes roraimae R. Bohart, 1979^{i c g}
- Tachytes rubellus R. Turner, 1908^{i c g}
- Tachytes rubioi R. Bohart, 1979^{i c g}
- Tachytes rufalaris R. Bohart, 1979^{i c g}
- Tachytes rufipalpis Cameron, 1904^{i c g}
- Tachytes rufiscutis R. Turner, 1918^{i c g}
- Tachytes rufomarginatus Arnold, 1945^{i c g}
- Tachytes rugulosus R. Bohart, 1979^{i c g}
- Tachytes sacricola Pulawski, 1962^{i c g}
- Tachytes sagani Guiglia, 1943^{i c g}
- Tachytes saharicus Pulawski, 1962^{i c g}
- Tachytes salvus Kohl, 1906^{i c g}
- Tachytes saundersii Bingham, 1897^{i c g}
- Tachytes sayi Banks, 1942^{i c g}
- Tachytes schlingeri R. Bohart, 1979^{i c g}
- Tachytes sculleni R. Bohart, 1962^{i c g}
- Tachytes sedulus F. Smith, 1860^{i c g}
- Tachytes seminole Banks, 1942^{i c g}
- Tachytes separabilis R. Turner, 1917^{i c g}
- Tachytes setiger Kohl, 1898^{i c g}
- Tachytes setosus Taschenberg, 1870^{i c g}
- Tachytes sexdens R. Bohart, 1979^{i c g}
- Tachytes sheppardi Arnold, 1940^{i c g}
- Tachytes silverlocki R. Turner, 1917^{i c g}
- Tachytes silvicola Williams, 1928^{i c g}
- Tachytes silvicoloides Williams, 1928^{i c g}
- Tachytes simillimus von Schulthess, 1926^{i c g}
- Tachytes simulans F. Smith, 1873^{i c g}
- Tachytes simulatrix R. Turner, 1917^{i c g}
- Tachytes sinensis F. Smith, 1856^{i c g}
- Tachytes sinuatus Pulawski, 1962^{i c g}
- Tachytes sjoestedti Cameron, 1908^{i c}
- Tachytes spatiosus T. Li, Cai and Q. Li, 2008^{i c g}
- Tachytes spatulatus W. Fox, 1892^{i c g}
- Tachytes stangei R. Bohart, 1979^{i c g}
- Tachytes sulcatus R. Turner, 1916^{i c g}
- Tachytes surigensis Williams, 1928^{i c g}
- Tachytes tabrobanae Cameron, 1900^{i c g}
- Tachytes tachyrrhostus de Saussure, 1854^{i c g}
- Tachytes tarsalis (Spinola, 1839)^{i c g}
- Tachytes testaceinervus Cameron, 1908^{i c g}
- Tachytes tomentosus Kohl in Schletterer, 1891^{i c g}
- Tachytes toyensis Tsuneki, 1971^{i c g}
- Tachytes transvaalensis Cameron, 1905^{i c g}
- Tachytes trichopygus Pulawski, 1962^{i c g}
- Tachytes tricinctus (Fabricius, 1804)^{i c g}
- Tachytes trigonalis de Saussure, 1867^{i c g}
- Tachytes turneri Arnold, 1923^{i c g}
- Tachytes ugandensis R. Turner, 1917^{i c g}
- Tachytes ustulatus R. Bohart, 1979^{i c g}
- Tachytes vagus Radoszkowski, 1877^{i c g}
- Tachytes validus Cresson, 1873^{i c g b}
- Tachytes vardyi R. Bohart, 1979^{i c g}
- Tachytes varians (Fabricius, 1804)^{i c g}
- Tachytes vechti Tsuneki, 1976^{i c g}
- Tachytes velox F. Smith, 1856^{i c g}
- Tachytes venezuelae R. Bohart, 1979^{i c g}
- Tachytes versatilis R. Turner, 1917^{i c g}
- Tachytes vestitus (F. Smith, 1873)^{i c g}
- Tachytes vicinus Cameron, 1889^{i c g}
- Tachytes villegasi R. Bohart, 1979^{i c g}
- Tachytes vischnu Cameron, 1889^{i c g}
- Tachytes volubilis R. Turner, 1917^{i c g}
- Tachytes werneri R. Bohart, 1994^{i c g}
- Tachytes willinki R. Bohart, 1979^{i c g}
- Tachytes xenoferus Rohwer, 1911^{i c g}
- Tachytes yerburyi Bingham, 1897^{i c g}
- Tachytes yunnanensis T. Li, Cai and Q. Li, 2008^{i c g}
- Tachytes zuliae R. Bohart, 1979^{i c g}

Data sources: i = ITIS, c = Catalogue of Life, g = GBIF, b = Bugguide.net
