= Giesvianka =

Giesvianka River Gnesvianka

Location
- Country: Lithuania
- County: Vilnius
- Municiplality: Vilnius District Municipality
- Eldership: Maišiagala Eldership

Physical characteristics
- Source: Kryžinė
- Mouth: Dūkšta
  - coordinates: 54°51′22″N 25°02′44″E

The Giesvianka (Gnesvianka) river is located in the Vilnius district of Lithuania. A tributary to the Dūkšta River, it begins at the village of Kryžinė and then flows northwest to join the Dūkšta River 11.6 km from its mouth, at a point southwest of Maišiagala. The Gnesvianka river flows through or near multiple villages, including Babrukiškės, Giesvės, and Saugūniškės.

The riverbed has been altered in many places by local people from the Soviet era. This makes the river a regulated Lithuanian river. The river spans 10.2 km.
