= Tachytes desertus =

Scientific classification
- Kingdom: Animalia
- Phylum: Arthropoda
- Clade: Pancrustacea
- Class: Insecta
- Order: Hymenoptera
- Family: Crabronidae
- Subtribe: Gastrosericina
- Genus: Tachytes
- Species: T. desertus

Binomial name
- Tachytes desertus R. Bohart, 1994

Species of wasp

Tachytes desertus is a species of square-headed wasp in the family Crabronidae.
