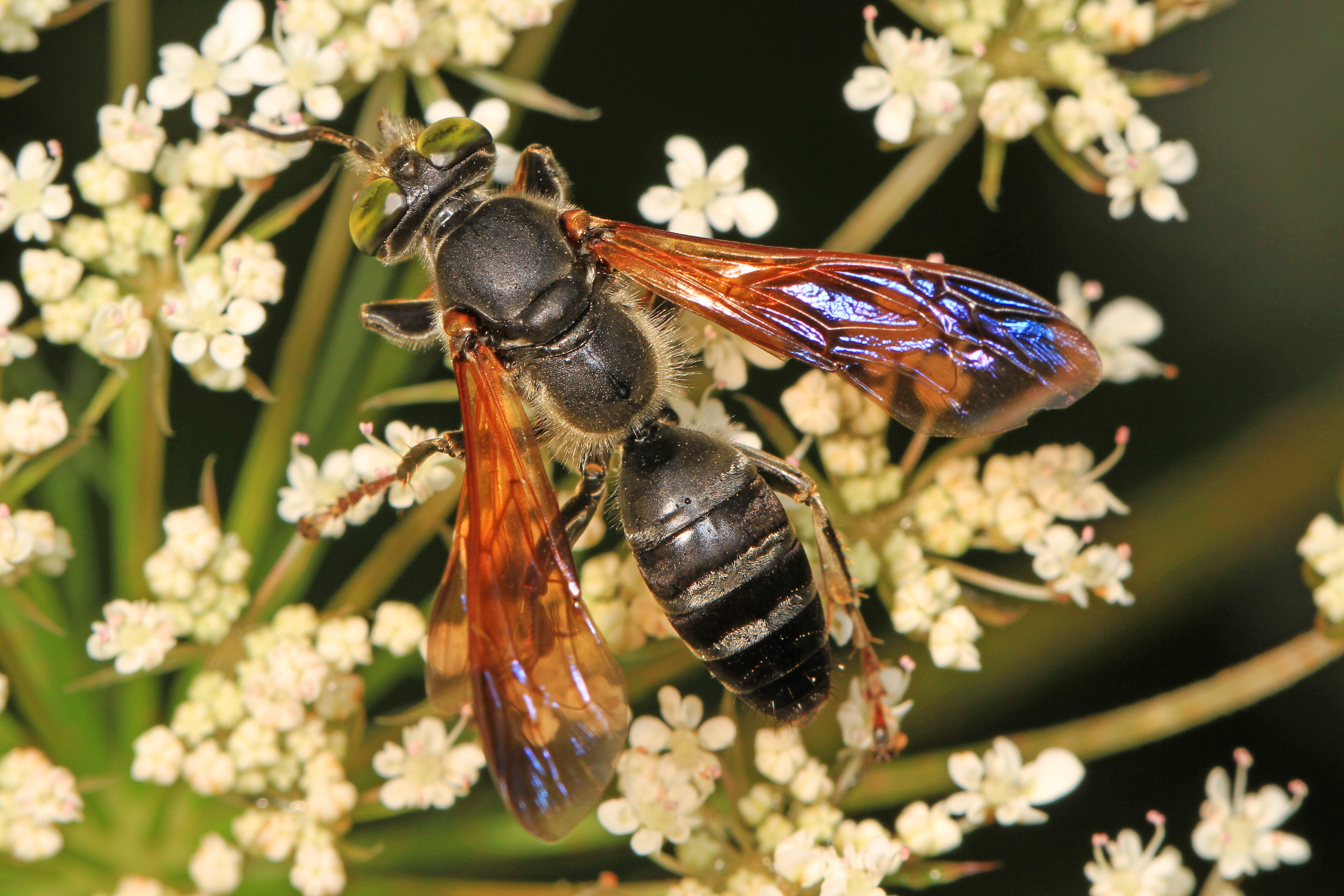

Scientific classification
- Kingdom: Animalia
- Phylum: Arthropoda
- Clade: Pancrustacea
- Class: Insecta
- Order: Hymenoptera
- Family: Crabronidae
- Subtribe: Gastrosericina
- Genus: Tachytes
- Species: T. guatemalensis

Binomial name
- Tachytes guatemalensis Cameron, 1889

Synonyms
- Liris coxalis Patton, 1892

= Tachytes guatemalensis =

Species of wasp

Tachytes guatemalensis is a species of square-headed wasp in the family Crabronidae. It is found in Central America and North America. The wasp is a predator of Melanoplus tequestae.

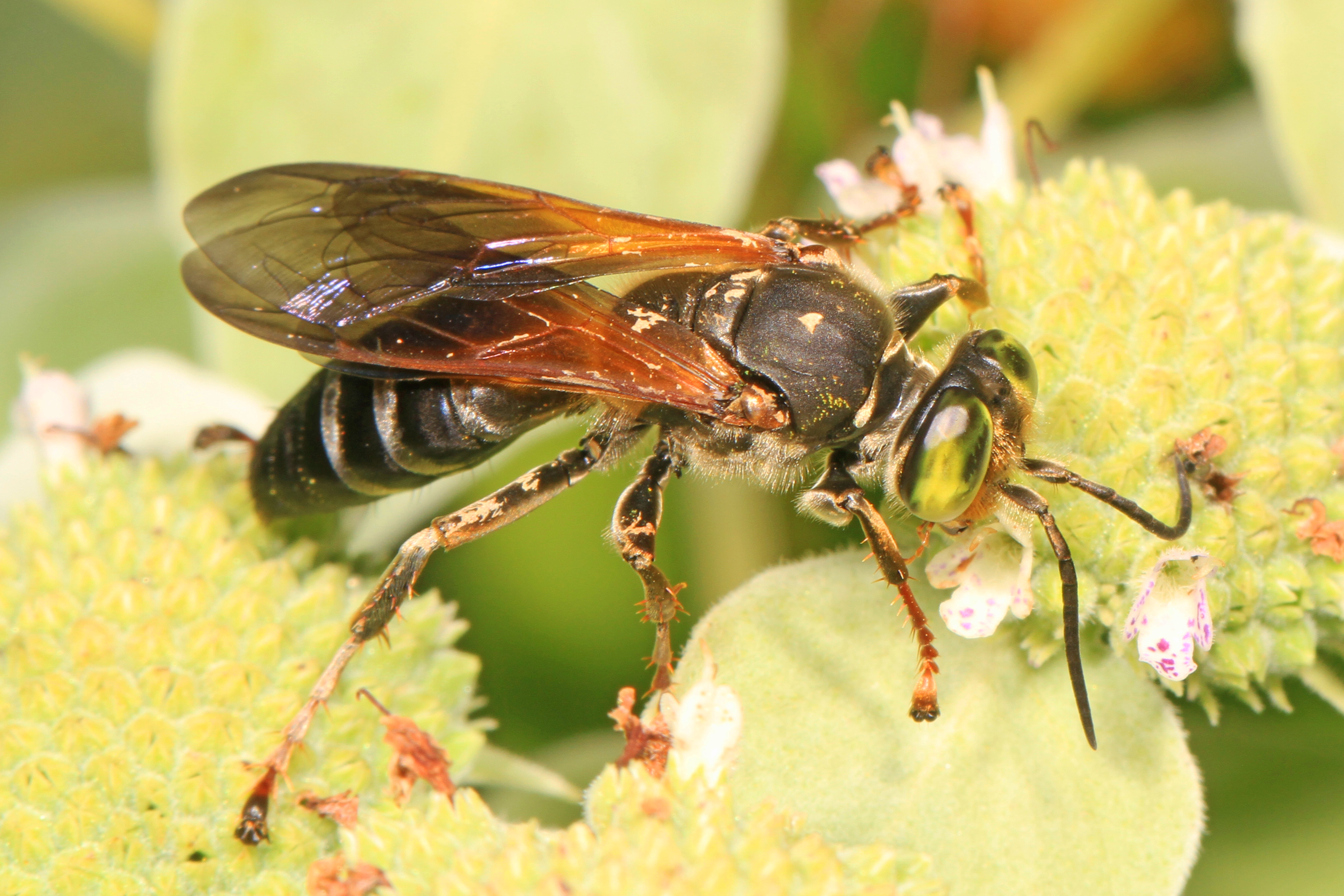
