= Tachytes grisselli =

Scientific classification
- Domain: Eukaryota
- Kingdom: Animalia
- Phylum: Arthropoda
- Class: Insecta
- Order: Hymenoptera
- Family: Crabronidae
- Subtribe: Gastrosericina
- Genus: Tachytes
- Species: T. grisselli

Binomial name
- Tachytes grisselli R. Bohart, 1994

Species of wasp

Tachytes grisselli is a species of square-headed wasp in the family Crabronidae.
