= Tachytes abdominalis =

Scientific classification
- Domain: Eukaryota
- Kingdom: Animalia
- Phylum: Arthropoda
- Class: Insecta
- Order: Hymenoptera
- Family: Crabronidae
- Genus: Tachytes
- Species: T. abdominalis

Binomial name
- Tachytes abdominalis (Say, 1823)

Synonyms
- Larra abdominalis Say, 1823

Species of wasp

Tachytes abdominalis is a species of square-headed wasp in the family Crabronidae. It is found in Central America and North America.
