= Tachytes validus =

Scientific classification
- Domain: Eukaryota
- Kingdom: Animalia
- Phylum: Arthropoda
- Class: Insecta
- Order: Hymenoptera
- Family: Crabronidae
- Genus: Tachytes
- Species: T. validus

Binomial name
- Tachytes validus Cresson, 1873

Synonyms
- Tachytes belfragei Banks, 1942; Tachytes breviventris Cresson, 1873; Tachytes calcaratiformis Rohwer, 1909; Tachytes calcaratiformis coloradensis Banks, 1942; Tachytes calcaratus W. Fox, 1892; Tachytes quadrifasciatus Dreisbach, 1948

Species of wasp

Tachytes validus is a species of square-headed wasp in the family Crabronidae. It is found in North America.
