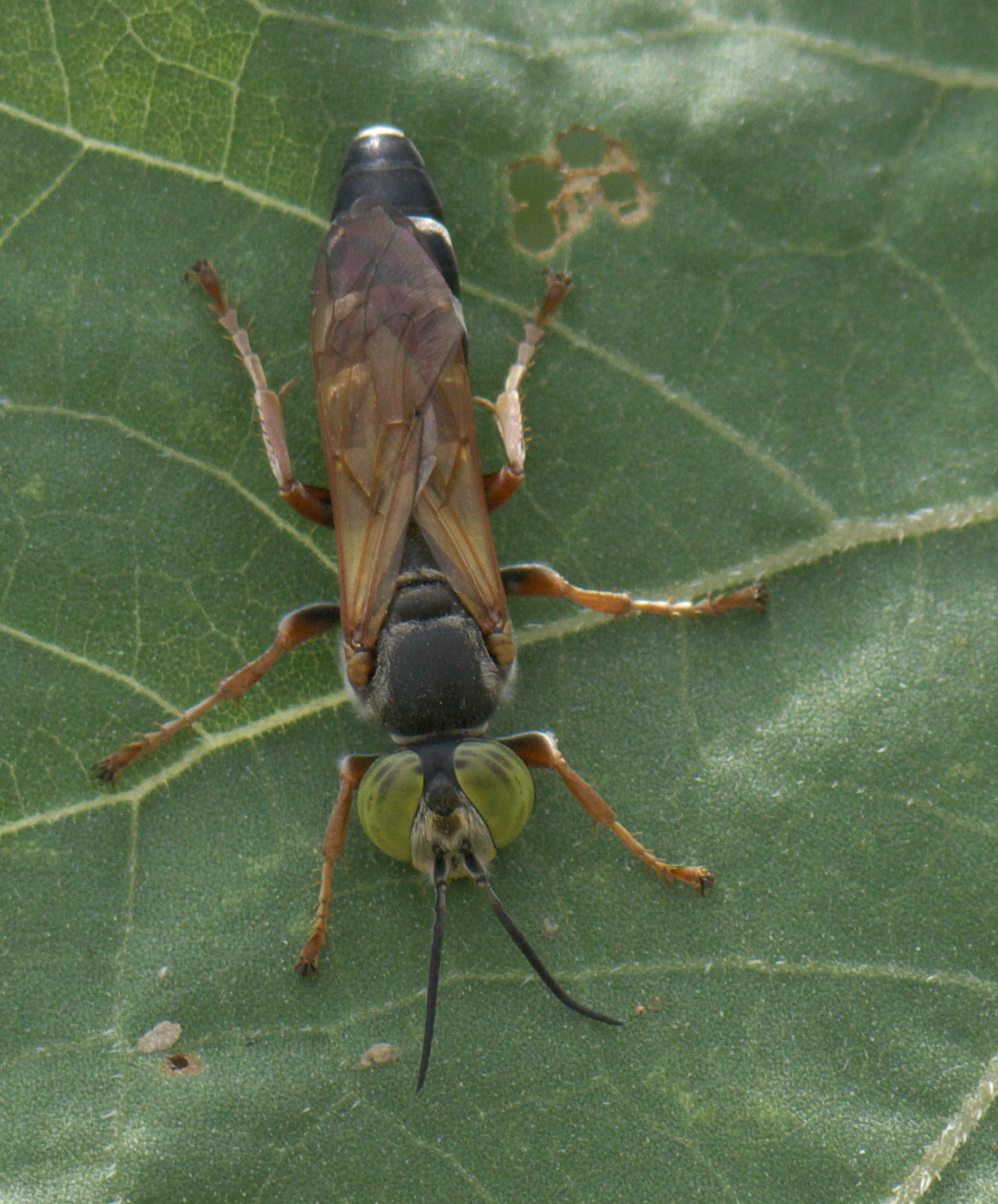

Scientific classification
- Kingdom: Animalia
- Phylum: Arthropoda
- Class: Insecta
- Order: Hymenoptera
- Family: Crabronidae
- Subtribe: Gastrosericina
- Genus: Tachytes
- Species: T. distinctus

Binomial name
- Tachytes distinctus F. Smith, 1856

Synonyms
- Larra fulvipes (F. Smith, 1856); Larrada fulvipes F. Smith, 1856; Tachytes austrinus Banks, 1942; Tachytes contractus W. Fox, 1892; Tachytes elongatus Cresson, 1873; Tachytes fulvipes (F. Smith, 1856); Tachytes yucatanensis Cameron, 1889

= Tachytes distinctus =

Species of wasp

Tachytes distinctus is a species of square-headed wasp in the family Crabronidae. It is found in the Caribbean Sea and North America.

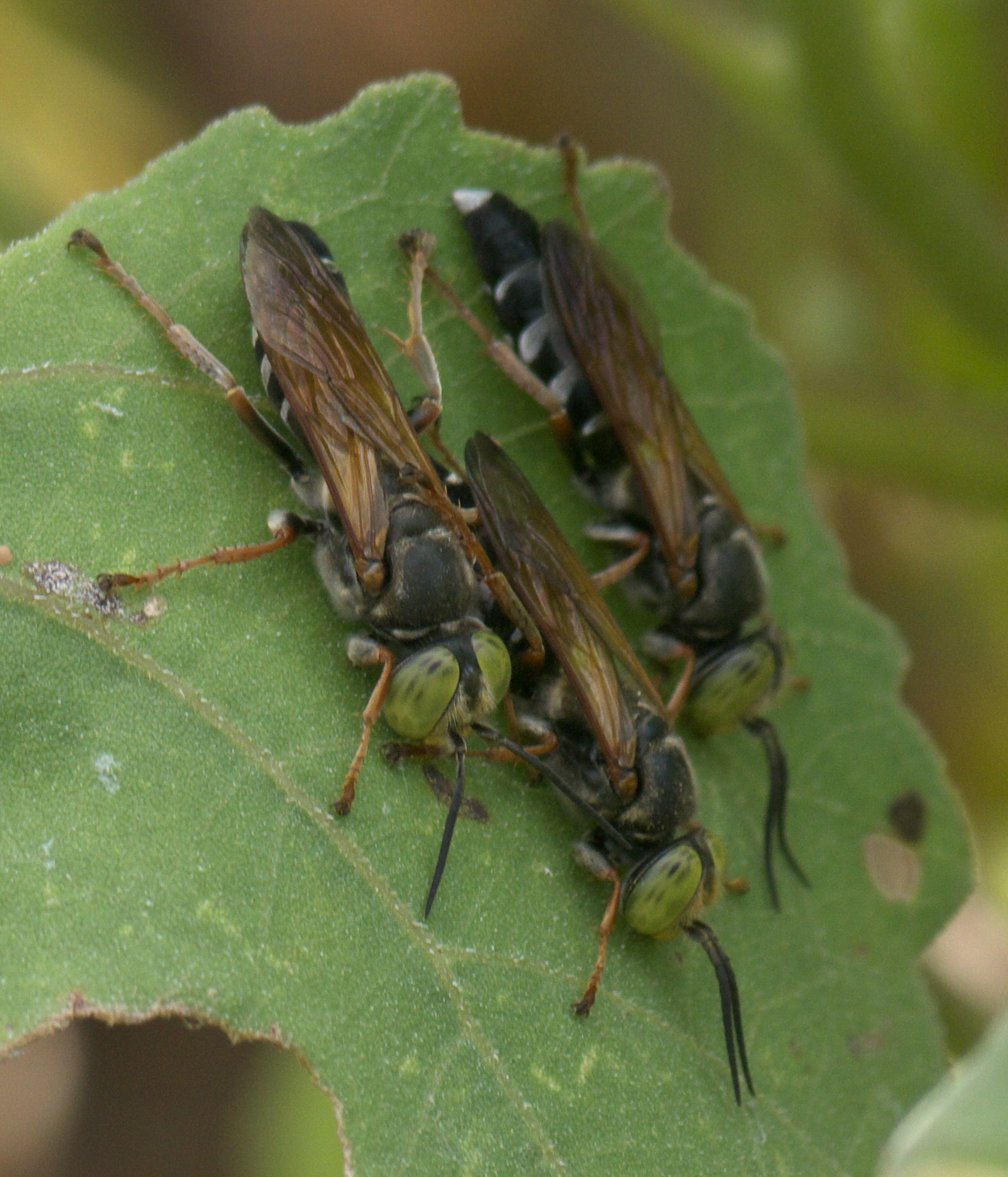

== Subspecies ==
These two subspecies belong to the species Tachytes distinctus:

- Tachytes distinctus bimini Krombein, 1953
- Tachytes distinctus distinctus F. Smith, 1856
