= Tachytes aurulentus =

Scientific classification
- Domain: Eukaryota
- Kingdom: Animalia
- Phylum: Arthropoda
- Class: Insecta
- Order: Hymenoptera
- Family: Crabronidae
- Genus: Tachytes
- Species: T. aurulentus

Binomial name
- Tachytes aurulentus (Fabricius, 1804)

Synonyms
- Larra aurulenta Fabricius, 1804; Tachytes duplicatus Rohwer, 1920; Tachytes mandibularis Patton, 1880; Tachytes propinquus Rohwer, 1909

Species of wasp

Tachytes aurulentus is a species of square-headed wasp in the family Crabronidae. It is found in North America.
