= Saugūniškės =

- Village
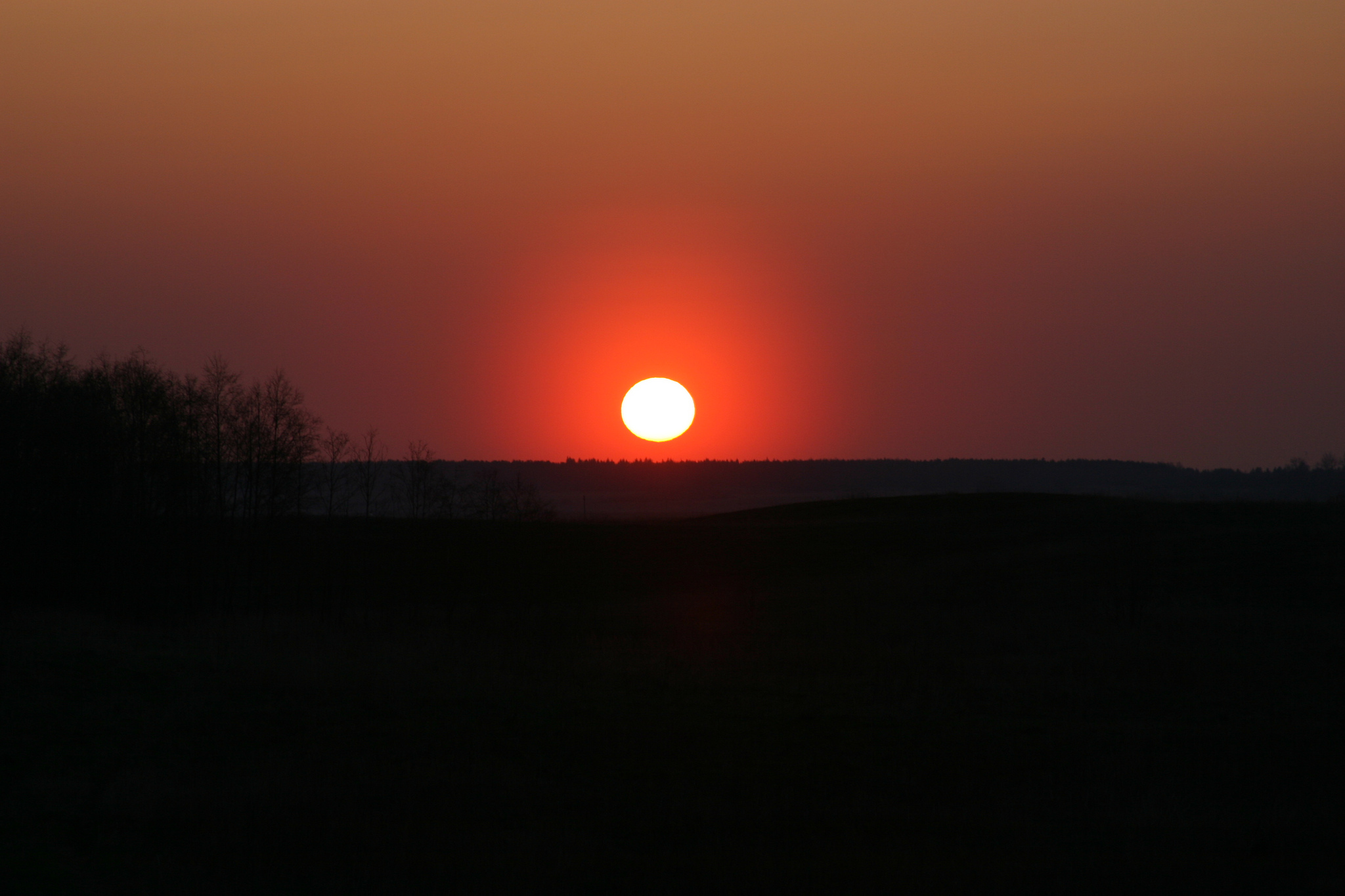
- Dawn at the Saugūniškės

- Location of Saugūniškės
- Coordinates: 54°51′00″N 25°04′41″E
- Country: Lithuania
- County: Vilnius County
- Municipality: Vilnius district municipality
- Eldership: Maišiagala eldership

Population (2011)
  - Total: 8
- Time zone: UTC+2 (EET)
  - Summer (DST): UTC+3 (EEST)

Saugūniškės is a village in Vilnius District Municipality, eastern Lithuania. According to the Lithuanian census of 2011, it has 8 inhabitants.

Surroundings of Saugūniškės are famous for crane roost. Village is known as one of the northernmost known points of Tachytes panzeri distribution in Europe.

== History ==
Bishop Ignotas Jokūbas Masalskis and Teodora Sapiegienė built a church and a manor house in Sudervė (village south of Saugūniškės). Saugūniškės was assigned to the church. From 1797 to 1820, the village was leased to a nobleman Simonas Baginavičius who worked as the church organist.

During the Soviet era in Lithuania (1960-1970), a drainage system was built in the area. cranes bread in the undeveloped areas of the village. The village has a 1-kilometre (0.62 mi) logn stream which flows into the Gnesvianka.

== Notable people ==
- Henryk Tomaszewicz (born 1942) is a hydrobotanist and a scientist.
