= Tachytes crassus =

Scientific classification
- Domain: Eukaryota
- Kingdom: Animalia
- Phylum: Arthropoda
- Class: Insecta
- Order: Hymenoptera
- Family: Crabronidae
- Subtribe: Gastrosericina
- Genus: Tachytes
- Species: T. crassus

Binomial name
- Tachytes crassus Patton, 1880

Species of wasp

Tachytes crassus is a species of square-headed wasp in the family Crabronidae. It is found in North America.
