= Babriškės (Varėna) =

Coordinates: 54°19′17″N 24°30′28″E

- Village
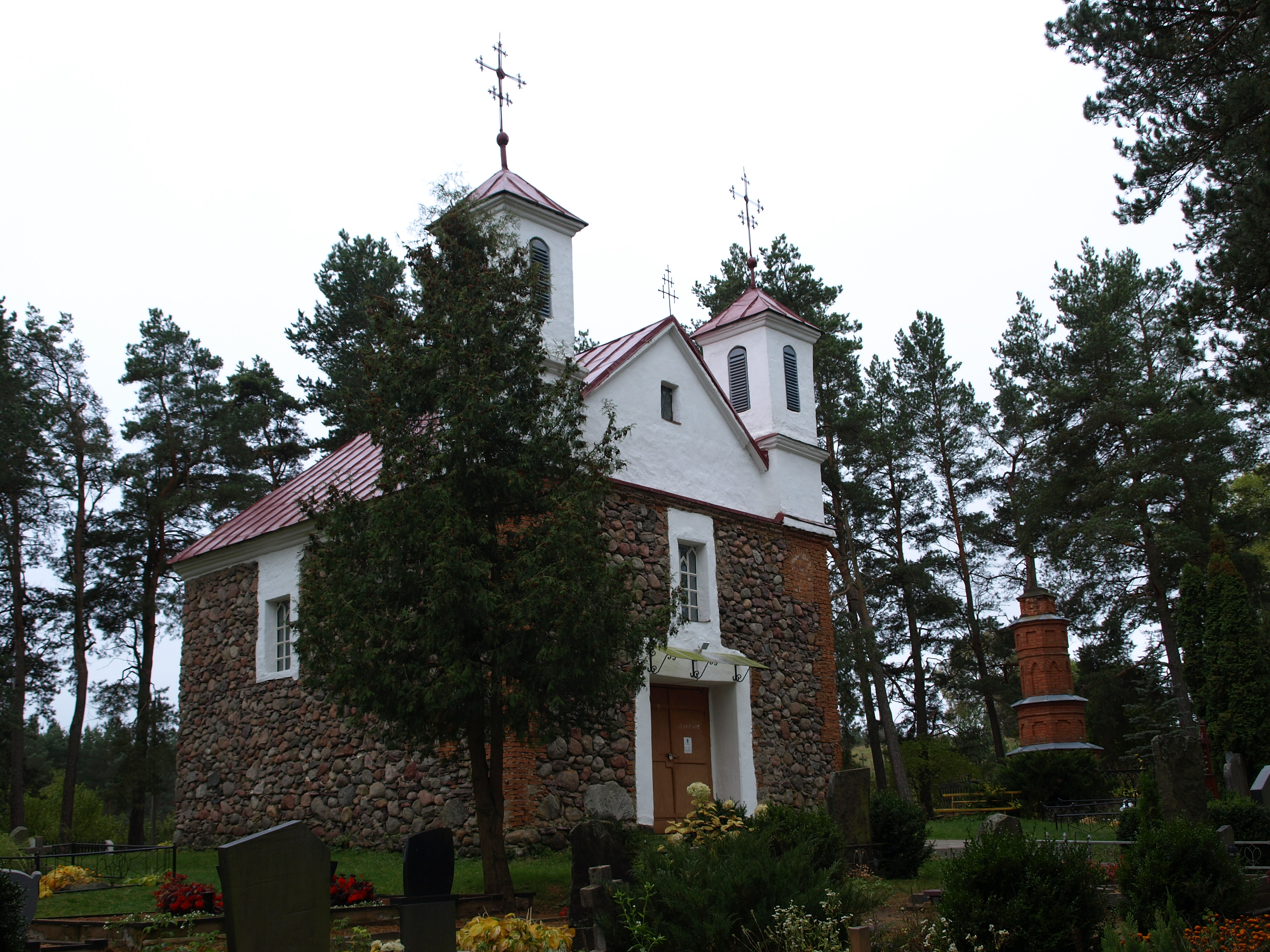
- Interactive map of Babriškės
- Country: Lithuania
- County: Alytus County
- Municipality: Varėna

Population (2001)
  - Total: 25
- Time zone: UTC+2 (EET)
  - Summer (DST): UTC+3 (EEST)

Babriškės is a village in the Varėna district municipality, within Alytus County, in southeastern Lithuania. According to the 2001 census, the village has a population of 25 people.
