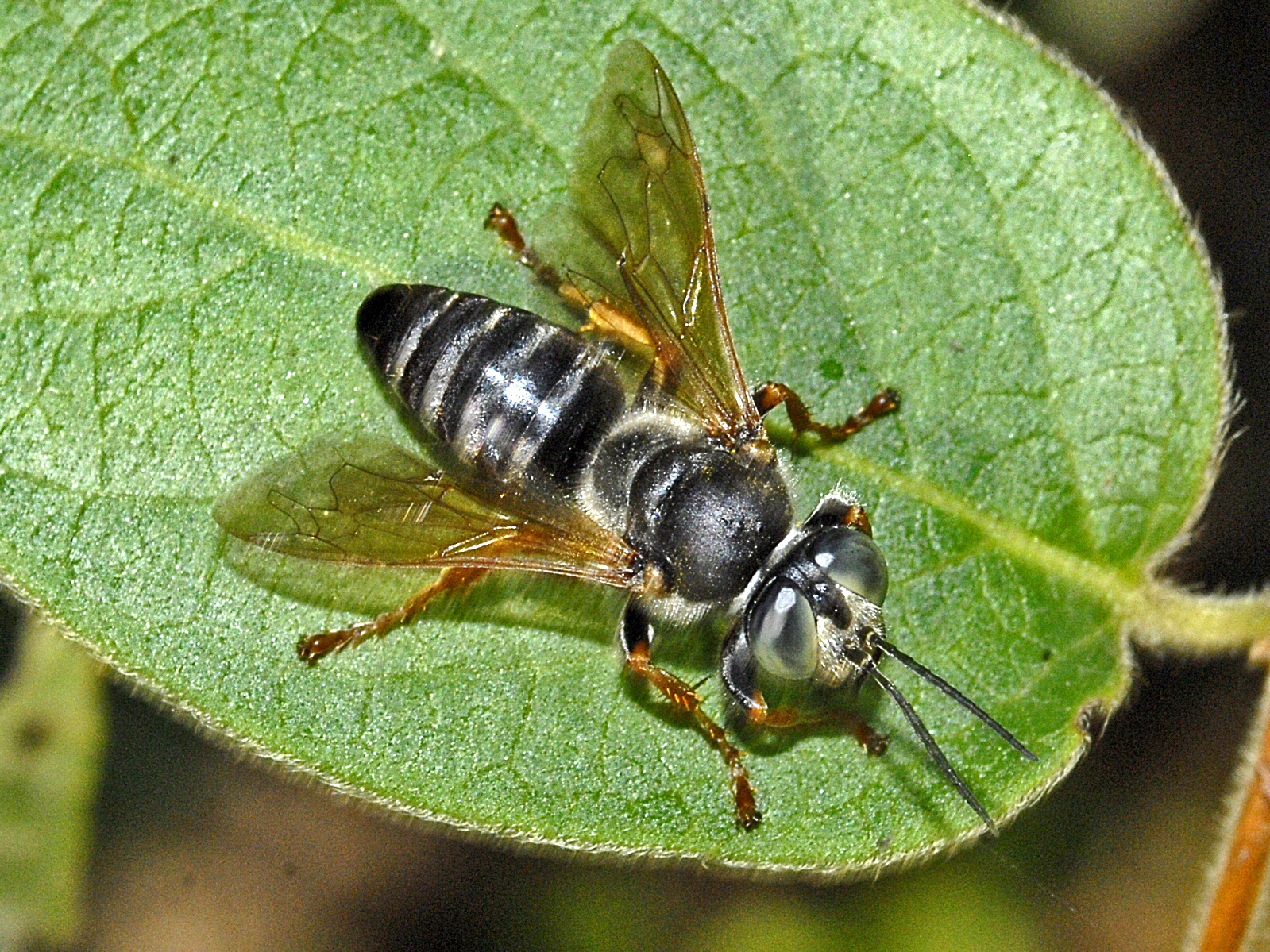
- Female

Scientific classification
- Domain: Eukaryota
- Kingdom: Animalia
- Phylum: Arthropoda
- Class: Insecta
- Order: Hymenoptera
- Family: Crabronidae
- Genus: Tachytes
- Species: T. etruscus

Binomial name
- Tachytes etruscus (Rossi, 1790)

Synonyms
- Andrena etrusca Rossi, 1790 species; Apis etrusca (Rossi, 1790) species; Larra etrusca (Rossi, 1790) species; Lyrops argentata (Brullé, 1832) species; Lyrops etrusca (Rossi, 1790) species; Tachytes argentatus Brullé, 1832 species

= Tachytes etruscus =

Species of wasp

Tachytes etruscus is a predatory, solitary wasp belonging to the family Crabronidae. The species was first described by Pietro Rossi in 1790.

== Distribution ==
This species is present in Albania, Austria, Bulgaria, France, Greece, Hungary, Italy, Portugal, Russia, Slovenia and Spain.

== Description ==
Tachytes etruscus can reach a length of 15–16 millimetres (0.59–0.63 in) in the female, and of 11–14 millimetres (0.43–0.55 in) in males. Its body is largely black, with silver stripes on the abdomen and brown to ferruginous wings, legs, mandibles and palpi.

== Biology ==
Females of this species usually predate on grasshoppers. The females dig holes in the ground in which they build some cells. Then they capture a prey grasshopper, paralyze it with a sting, carry it inside the underground nest and seal it in the burrow along with an egg. The larva consumes the prey during development. Males apparently guard the entrance of the burrows with developing females, waiting for them to emerge. These wasps have a preference for flowers of Solidago virgaurea and Echinophora spinosa.
