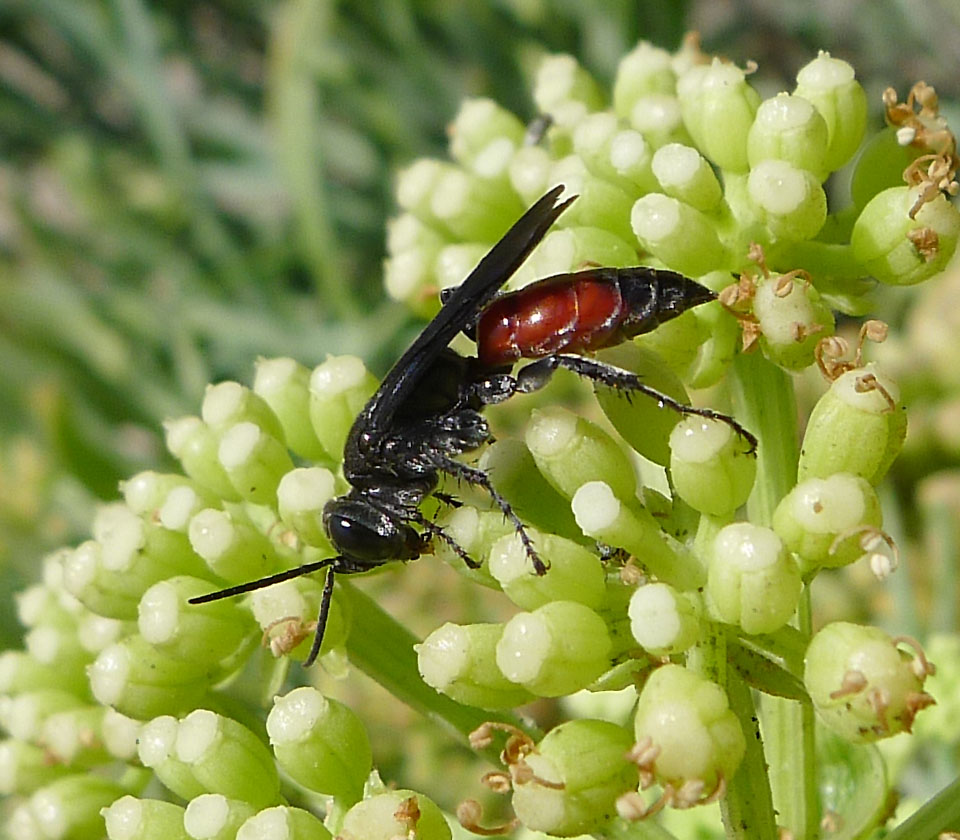

Scientific classification
- Kingdom: Animalia
- Phylum: Arthropoda
- Class: Insecta
- Order: Hymenoptera
- Family: Crabronidae
- Genus: Tachytes
- Species: T. panzeri

Binomial name
- Tachytes panzeri Dufour 1841
- The distribution of Tachytes panzeri in green, with a red line showing the latitude of the highest north Tachytes panzeri inhabit.

= Tachytes panzeri =

Species of wasp

Tachytes panzeri is a species of wasp of the genus Tachytes. They generally prey on Orthoptera; they also prey on moths. They are found in Europe (although only south of the Saugūniškės village), Northern Africa, South Asia and North Asia. Tachytes panzeri is generally characterised by their generally black colour and their central part of their abdomen being coloured red.

The name Tachytes panzeri comes from the Greek word for speed or swiftness tachytes (ταχύτης), and the word panzeri honours the German botanist and entomologist Georg Wolfgang Franz Panzer. It was first documented by Leon Jean Marie Dufour.
