= Tachytes intermedius =

Scientific classification
- Kingdom: Animalia
- Phylum: Arthropoda
- Clade: Pancrustacea
- Class: Insecta
- Order: Hymenoptera
- Family: Crabronidae
- Genus: Tachytes
- Species: T. intermedius

Binomial name
- Tachytes intermedius (Viereck, 1906)

Synonyms
- Tachysphex intermedius Viereck, 1906; Tachytes amiculus Rohwer, 1909; Tachytes austerus Mickel, 1916; Tachytes maestus Mickel, 1916; Tachytes minutus Banks, 1942

Species of wasp

Tachytes intermedius is a species of square-headed wasp in the family Crabronidae. It is found in Central America and North America.
