= List of Ectemnius species =

This is a list of 188 species in the genus Ectemnius.

== Ectemnius species ==
- Ectemnius abnormis (Blackburn in Blackburn and Cameron, 1886)
- Ectemnius abyssinicus (Arnold, 1947)
- Ectemnius adspectans (Blackburn in Blackburn and Cameron, 1886)
- Ectemnius agycus (Cameron, 1904)
- Ectemnius albomaculatus Tsuneki, 1966
- Ectemnius alishanus Tsuneki, 1968
- Ectemnius alpheus Pate, 1946
- Ectemnius ammanitus Leclercq, 1958
- Ectemnius anomalifulvus Ch.-y Li and Q. Li, 2009
- Ectemnius apo Tsuneki, 1984
- Ectemnius apoensis Tsuneki, 1984
- Ectemnius aprunatus Leclercq, 1968
- Ectemnius arcuatus (Say, 1837)
- Ectemnius arreptus (Kohl, 1915)
- Ectemnius arrogans (Arnold, 1958)
- Ectemnius atriceps (Cresson, 1865)
- Ectemnius atripennis (R. Perkins in R. Perkins and Forel, 1899)
- Ectemnius auriceps (Cresson, 1865)
- Ectemnius aztecus Leclercq, 1951
- Ectemnius basiflavus (Brèthes, 1910)
- Ectemnius belli Leclercq, 1999
- Ectemnius berissus Leclercq, 1972
- Ectemnius besseyae (Rohwer, 1908)
- Ectemnius birmanus Leclercq, 1999
- Ectemnius bogorensis Leclercq, 1958
- Ectemnius boletus Leclercq, 1958
- Ectemnius borealis (Zetterstedt, 1838)
- Ectemnius burgdorfi Leclercq, 1968
- Ectemnius carinatus (F. Smith, 1873)
- Ectemnius cavifrons (Thomson, 1870)
- Ectemnius centralis (Cameron, 1891)
- Ectemnius cephalotes (Olivier, 1792)
- Ectemnius chagrinatus Leclercq, 1950
- Ectemnius chrysites (Kohl, 1892)
- Ectemnius clearei Leclercq, 1964
- Ectemnius compactus (R. Perkins in R. Perkins and Forel, 1899)
- Ectemnius confinis (Walker, 1871)
- Ectemnius conglobatus (R. Turner, 1908)
- Ectemnius continuus (Fabricius, 1804)
- Ectemnius cooperi Leclercq, 1991
- Ectemnius corporaali Leclercq, 1950
- Ectemnius corvidus Leclercq, 1961
- Ectemnius craesus (Lepeletier de Saint Fargeau and Brullé, 1835)
- Ectemnius crassicornis (Spinola, 1808)
- Ectemnius crippsi (Arnold, 1927)
- Ectemnius crudator Leclercq, 1968
- Ectemnius cuernosi Leclercq, 1963
- Ectemnius curictensis (Mader, 1940)
- Ectemnius curtipes (R. Perkins in R. Perkins and Forel, 1899)
- Ectemnius cyanauges Pate, 1941
- Ectemnius dartanus Leclercq, 1968
- Ectemnius dayi Leclercq, 1999
- Ectemnius decemmaculatus (Say, 1823)
- Ectemnius dilectus (Cresson, 1865)
- Ectemnius discrepans (Giffard, 1915)
- Ectemnius distinctus (F. Smith, 1856)
- Ectemnius dives (Lepeletier de Saint Fargeau & Brullé, 1835)
- Ectemnius dizoster Pate, 1947
- Ectemnius domingensis Leclercq, 1950
- Ectemnius dominicanus Evans, 1972
- Ectemnius dungensis Leclercq, 1958
- Ectemnius embeliae Leclercq, 1958
- Ectemnius erebus Leclercq, 1958
- Ectemnius excavatus (W. Fox, 1892)
- Ectemnius ferrasi Alayo Dalmau, 1968
- Ectemnius flagellarius (F. Morawitz, 1892)
- Ectemnius flavipennis (Lepeletier de Saint Fargeau and Brullé, 1835)
- Ectemnius flavohirtus Tsuneki, 1954
- Ectemnius fossorius (Linnaeus, 1758)
- Ectemnius fredericismithi (W. Schulz, 1906)
- Ectemnius fulvicrus (R. Perkins in R. Perkins and Forel, 1899)
- Ectemnius fulvopilosellus (Cameron, 1902)
- Ectemnius furuichii (Iwata, 1934)
- Ectemnius fuscipennis (Lepeletier de Saint Fargeau and Brullé, 1835)
- Ectemnius guadalupensis Leclercq, 1972
- Ectemnius guttatus (Vander Linden, 1829)
- Ectemnius haleakalae (R. Perkins in R. Perkins and Forel, 1899)
- Ectemnius hawaiiensis (R. Perkins in R. Perkins and Forel, 1899)
- Ectemnius hebetescens (R. Turner, 1908)
- Ectemnius hector (Cameron, 1891)
- Ectemnius hispanicus (Kohl, 1915)
- Ectemnius honiarae Leclercq, 1999
- Ectemnius hypsae (De Stefani Perez, 1884)
- Ectemnius iliganensis Tsuneki, 1984
- Ectemnius insignis (F. Smith, 1856)
- Ectemnius invalidus Leclercq, 1958
- Ectemnius iridifrons (Pérez, 1905)
- Ectemnius kriechbaumeri (Kohl, 1879)
- Ectemnius krombeini Tsuneki, 1983
- Ectemnius krusemani (Leclercq, 1950)
- Ectemnius kvak Marshakov, 1976
- Ectemnius laevidorsis Tsuneki, 1977
- Ectemnius lapidarius (Panzer, 1803)
- Ectemnius leonesus Leclercq, 1968
- Ectemnius lesticoides Leclercq, 1950
- Ectemnius lituratus (Panzer, 1803)
- Ectemnius lysias (Cameron, 1905)
- Ectemnius mackayensis (R. Turner, 1908)
- Ectemnius maculosus (Gmelin, 1790)
- Ectemnius mamasae Leclercq, 1999
- Ectemnius mandibularis (F. Smith, 1879)
- Ectemnius martjanowi (F. Morawitz, 1892)
- Ectemnius massiliensis (Kohl, 1883)
- Ectemnius mayeri (Dewitz, 1881)
- Ectemnius melanotarsis (Cameron, 1902)
- Ectemnius menyllus (Cameron, 1905)
- Ectemnius meridionalis (A. Costa, 1867)
- Ectemnius mindanaonis Tsuneki in Tsuneki et al., 1992
- Ectemnius molokaiensis (R. Perkins in R. Perkins and Forel, 1899)
- Ectemnius monticola (R. Perkins in R. Perkins and Forel, 1899)
- Ectemnius neptunus Leclercq, 1958
- Ectemnius nesiotes (Pate, 1937)
- Ectemnius nigellus R. Bohart in R. Bohart and Kimsey, 1979
- Ectemnius nigritarsus (Herrich-Schaeffer, 1841)
- Ectemnius nitobei (Matsumura, 1912)
- Ectemnius noyesi Leclercq, 1991
- Ectemnius odyneroides (Cresson, 1865)
- Ectemnius orius Leclercq, 1958
- Ectemnius pacuarus Leclercq, 1972
- Ectemnius pahangi Leclercq, 1958
- Ectemnius palamosi Leclercq, 1964
- Ectemnius paluster Alayo Dalmau, 1968
- Ectemnius papuanus Tsuneki, 1983
- Ectemnius papuensis Tsuneki, 1983
- Ectemnius paucimaculatus (Packard, 1866)
- Ectemnius pedicellaris (F. Morawitz, 1889)
- Ectemnius pelotarum Leclercq, 1968
- Ectemnius pempuchi Tsuneki, 1971
- Ectemnius pendleburyi Leclercq, 1958
- Ectemnius persicus (Kohl, 1888)
- Ectemnius philippinensis Tsuneki, 1976
- Ectemnius plutonius Leclercq, 1958
- Ectemnius polynesialis (Cameron, 1881)
- Ectemnius praeclarus (Arnold, 1945)
- Ectemnius praevius (Kohl, 1915)
- Ectemnius productus (W. Fox, 1897)
- Ectemnius psychosus Leclercq, 1999
- Ectemnius psyllus Leclercq, 1982
- Ectemnius pulawskii Leclercq, 1999
- Ectemnius radiatus (Pérez, 1905)
- Ectemnius recuperatus Leclercq, 1972
- Ectemnius reginellus (Leclercq, 1954)
- Ectemnius riosorum Leclercq, 1968
- Ectemnius rubicola (Dufour and Perris, 1840)
- Ectemnius rubrocaudatus (Blackburn in Blackburn and Cameron, 1886)
- Ectemnius ruficornis (Zetterstedt, 1838)
- Ectemnius rufifemur (Packard, 1866)
- Ectemnius rufipes (Lepeletier de Saint Fargeau & Brullé, 1835)
- Ectemnius rugifer (Dahlbom, 1845)
- Ectemnius rugosellus Tsuneki, 1984
- Ectemnius rugosus Tsuneki, 1984
- Ectemnius sagutorius Leclercq, 1999
- Ectemnius satan Pate, 1946
- Ectemnius scaber (Lepeletier de Saint Fargeau & Brullé, 1835)
- Ectemnius schlettereri (Kohl, 1888)
- Ectemnius schwarzi (Rohwer, 1911)
- Ectemnius semipunctatus (Lepeletier de Saint Fargeau and Brullé, 1835)
- Ectemnius semirus Leclercq, 1982
- Ectemnius sennacus Leclercq, 1968
- Ectemnius sexcinctus (Fabricius, 1775)
- Ectemnius seyrigi (Arnold, 1945)
- Ectemnius shimoyamai Tsuneki, 1958
- Ectemnius slateri (Arnold, 1926)
- Ectemnius sodalis (Bingham, 1897)
- Ectemnius solomonicus Tsuneki, 1983
- Ectemnius sonorensis (Cameron, 1891)
- Ectemnius spiniferus (W. Fox, 1895)
- Ectemnius spinipes (A. Morawitz, 1866)
- Ectemnius stirpicola (Packard, 1866)
- Ectemnius stygius (Kirby in Blackburn and Kirby, 1880)
- Ectemnius tabanicida (Fischer, 1929)
- Ectemnius taino Pate, 1947
- Ectemnius tarawakanus Tsuneki, 1976
- Ectemnius teleges Pate, 1946
- Ectemnius trichiosomus (Cameron, 1904)
- Ectemnius trifasciatus (Say, 1824)
- Ectemnius tsuifenicus Tsuneki, 1971
- Ectemnius tumidoventris (R. Perkins in R. Perkins and Forel, 1899)
- Ectemnius urophori (Radoszkowski, 1877)
- Ectemnius varentzowi (F. Morawitz, 1894)
- Ectemnius violaceipennis (Cameron, 1907)
- Ectemnius walteri (Kohl in Kohl and Handlirsch, 1889)
- Ectemnius wasbaueri Leclercq, 1999
- Ectemnius weberi Yoshimoto, 1960
- Ectemnius wickwari (R. Turner, 1920)
- Ectemnius yitonus Leclercq, 2007
- Ectemnius yoshimotoi R. Bohart in R. Bohart and Menke, 1976
- Ectemnius zonsteini H.-J. Jacobs, 2016
