= Ectemnius stirpicola =

Scientific classification
- Domain: Eukaryota
- Kingdom: Animalia
- Phylum: Arthropoda
- Class: Insecta
- Order: Hymenoptera
- Family: Crabronidae
- Genus: Ectemnius
- Species: E. stirpicola

Binomial name
- Ectemnius stirpicola (Packard, 1866)

Synonyms
- Crabro stirpicola Packard, 1866

Species of wasp

Ectemnius stirpicola is a species of square-headed wasp in the family Crabronidae. It is found in North America.
