= Ectemnius rufipes =

Scientific classification
- Kingdom: Animalia
- Phylum: Arthropoda
- Class: Insecta
- Order: Hymenoptera
- Family: Crabronidae
- Tribe: Crabronini
- Genus: Ectemnius
- Species: E. rufipes

Binomial name
- Ectemnius rufipes (Lepeletier de Saint Fargeau & Brullé, 1835)

Synonyms
- Ceratocolus rufipes Lepeletier de Saint Fargeau and Brullé, 1835; Crabro texanus Cresson, 1873; Ectemnius texanus (Cresson, 1873); Hypocrabro texanus (Cresson, 1873); Solenius texanus (Cresson, 1873)

Species of wasp

Ectemnius rufipes is a species of square-headed wasp in the family Crabronidae. It is found in North America.

== Subspecies ==
These two subspecies belong to the species Ectemnius rufipes:

- Ectemnius rufipes ais Pate, 1946
- Ectemnius rufipes rufipes (Lepeletier de Saint Fargeau & Brullé, 1835)
