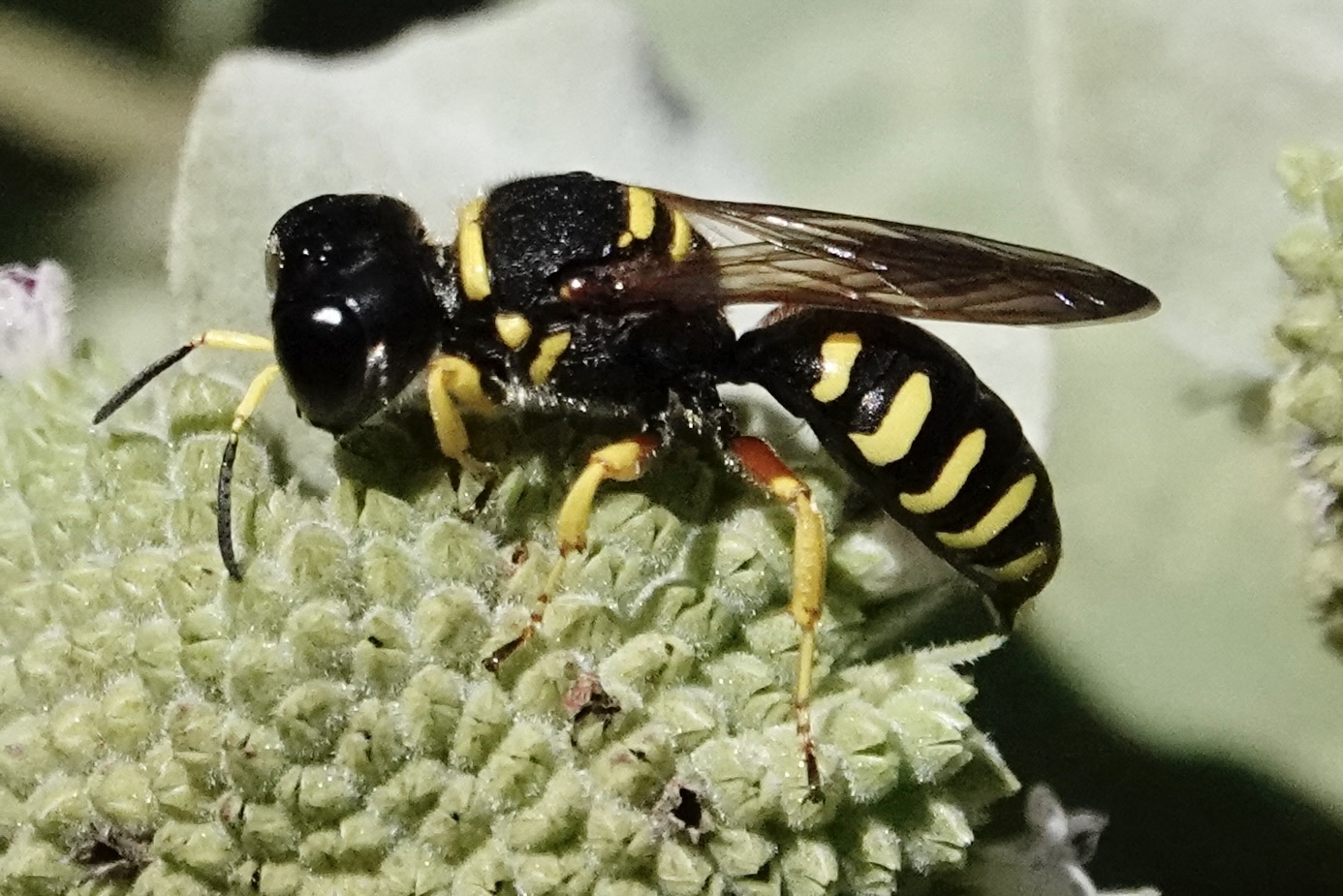

Scientific classification
- Kingdom: Animalia
- Phylum: Arthropoda
- Clade: Pancrustacea
- Class: Insecta
- Order: Hymenoptera
- Family: Crabronidae
- Genus: Ectemnius
- Species: E. decemmaculatus

Binomial name
- Ectemnius decemmaculatus (Say, 1823)

Synonyms
- Crabro aurifrons F. Smith, 1856; Crabro chrysargyrus Lepeletier de Saint Fargeau and Brullé, 1835; Crabro collinus F. Smith, 1856; Crabro decemmaculatus Say, 1823; Crabro novanus Rohwer, 1911; Ectemnius chrysargyrus (Lepeletier de Saint Fargeau and Brullé, 1835); Solenius chrysargyrus (Lepeletier de Saint Fargeau and Brullé, 1835)

= Ectemnius decemmaculatus =

Species of wasp

Ectemnius decemmaculatus is a species of square-headed wasp in the family Crabronidae. It is found in North America.
