= Ectemnius scaber =

Scientific classification
- Kingdom: Animalia
- Phylum: Arthropoda
- Class: Insecta
- Order: Hymenoptera
- Family: Crabronidae
- Tribe: Crabronini
- Genus: Ectemnius
- Species: E. scaber

Binomial name
- Ectemnius scaber (Lepeletier de Saint Fargeau & Brullé, 1835)

Synonyms
- Solenius scaber Lepeletier de Saint Fargeau and Brullé, 1835

Species of wasp

Ectemnius scaber is a species of square-headed wasp in the family Crabronidae. It is found in North America.

== Subspecies ==
These two subspecies belong to the species Ectemnius scaber:

- Ectemnius scaber rufescens Krombein, 1954
- Ectemnius scaber scaber (Lepeletier de Saint Fargeau & Brullé, 1835)
