= Ectemnius arcuatus =

Scientific classification
- Domain: Eukaryota
- Kingdom: Animalia
- Phylum: Arthropoda
- Class: Insecta
- Order: Hymenoptera
- Family: Crabronidae
- Genus: Ectemnius
- Species: E. arcuatus

Binomial name
- Ectemnius arcuatus (Say, 1837)

Synonyms
- Crabro arcuatus Say, 1837; Crabro honestus Cresson, 1865; Crabro nokomis (Cresson, 1865); Crabro packardi Cresson, 1865; Crabro villosifrons Packard, 1866; Hypocrabro packardi Rohwer, 1908

Species of wasp

Ectemnius arcuatus is a species of square-headed wasp in the family Crabronidae. It is found in North America.
