= Ectemnius sonorensis =

Scientific classification
- Domain: Eukaryota
- Kingdom: Animalia
- Phylum: Arthropoda
- Class: Insecta
- Order: Hymenoptera
- Family: Crabronidae
- Tribe: Crabronini
- Genus: Ectemnius
- Species: E. sonorensis

Binomial name
- Ectemnius sonorensis (Cameron, 1891)

Synonyms
- Crabro ferrugineipes Rohwer, 1908; Crabro imbutus W. Fox, 1894; Crabro montivagus Cameron, 1891; Crabro sonorensis Cameron, 1891; Ectemnius ferrugineipes (Rohwer, 1908); Ectemnius imbutus (W. Fox, 1894); Ectemnius montivagus (Cameron, 1891); Pseudocrabro imbutus (W. Fox, 1894)

Species of square-headed wasp

Ectemnius sonorensis is a species of square-headed wasp in the family Crabronidae. It is found in Central America.
