= Ectemnius rufifemur =

Scientific classification
- Domain: Eukaryota
- Kingdom: Animalia
- Phylum: Arthropoda
- Class: Insecta
- Order: Hymenoptera
- Family: Crabronidae
- Genus: Ectemnius
- Species: E. rufifemur

Binomial name
- Ectemnius rufifemur (Packard, 1866)

Synonyms
- Crabro rufifemur Packard, 1866

Species of wasp

Ectemnius rufifemur is a species of square-headed wasp in the family Crabronidae. It is found in Central America and North America.

== Subspecies ==
These two subspecies belong to the species Ectemnius rufifemur:

- Ectemnius rufifemur orizabinus Leclercq, 1968
- Ectemnius rufifemur rufifemur (Packard, 1866)
