= Ectemnius centralis =

Scientific classification
- Domain: Eukaryota
- Kingdom: Animalia
- Phylum: Arthropoda
- Class: Insecta
- Order: Hymenoptera
- Family: Crabronidae
- Tribe: Crabronini
- Genus: Ectemnius
- Species: E. centralis

Binomial name
- Ectemnius centralis (Cameron, 1891)

Synonyms
- Crabro centralis Cameron, 1891

Species of wasp

Ectemnius centralis is a species of square-headed wasp in the family Crabronidae. It is found in the Caribbean, Central America, and South America.
