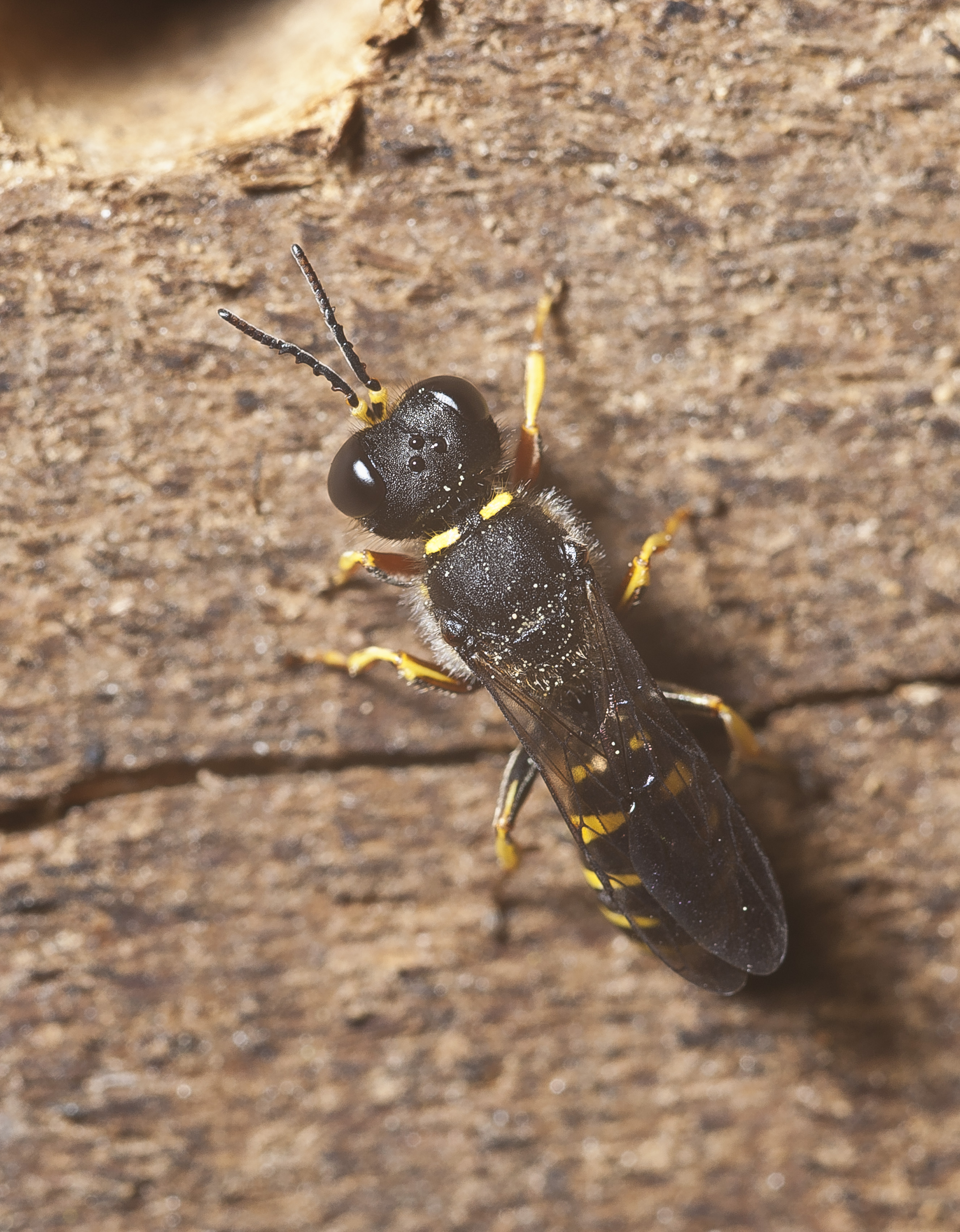

Scientific classification
- Domain: Eukaryota
- Kingdom: Animalia
- Phylum: Arthropoda
- Class: Insecta
- Order: Hymenoptera
- Family: Crabronidae
- Subfamily: Crabroninae
- Tribe: Crabronini
- Genus: Ectemnius
- Species: E. cavifrons

Binomial name
- Ectemnius cavifrons (Thomson,1870)

= Ectemnius cavifrons =

Species of wasp

Ectemnius cavifrons is a Palearctic species of solitary wasp.
