= Ectemnius cephalotes =

Scientific classification
- Kingdom: Animalia
- Phylum: Arthropoda
- Clade: Pancrustacea
- Class: Insecta
- Order: Hymenoptera
- Family: Crabronidae
- Genus: Ectemnius
- Species: E. cephalotes

Binomial name
- Ectemnius cephalotes (Olivier, 1792)

Synonyms
- Blepharipus striatulus Olivier, 1792; Ceratocolus striatus Olivier, 1792; Crabro aciculatus Olivier, 1792; Crabro cephalotes Panzer, 1799; Crabro fargeii Stephens, 1829; Crabro floralis (Lepeletier de Saint Fargeau and Brullé, 1835); Crabro geniculatus Lepeletier de Saint Fargeau and Brullé, 1835; Crabro interruptus Lepeletier de Saint Fargeau and Brullé, 1835; Crabro lindenius Shuckard, 1837; Crabro ruthenicus Dahlbom, 1839; Crabro shuckardi Dahlbom, 1845; Crabro striatus (Dahlbom, 1845); Crabro subinterruptus Smith, 1856; Solenius aciculatus Provancher, 1882; Solenius interruptus (Provancher, 1882)

Species of wasp

Ectemnius cephalotes is a species of square-headed wasps in the family Crabronidae. It is found in Europe and Northern Asia (excluding China) as well as North America.
