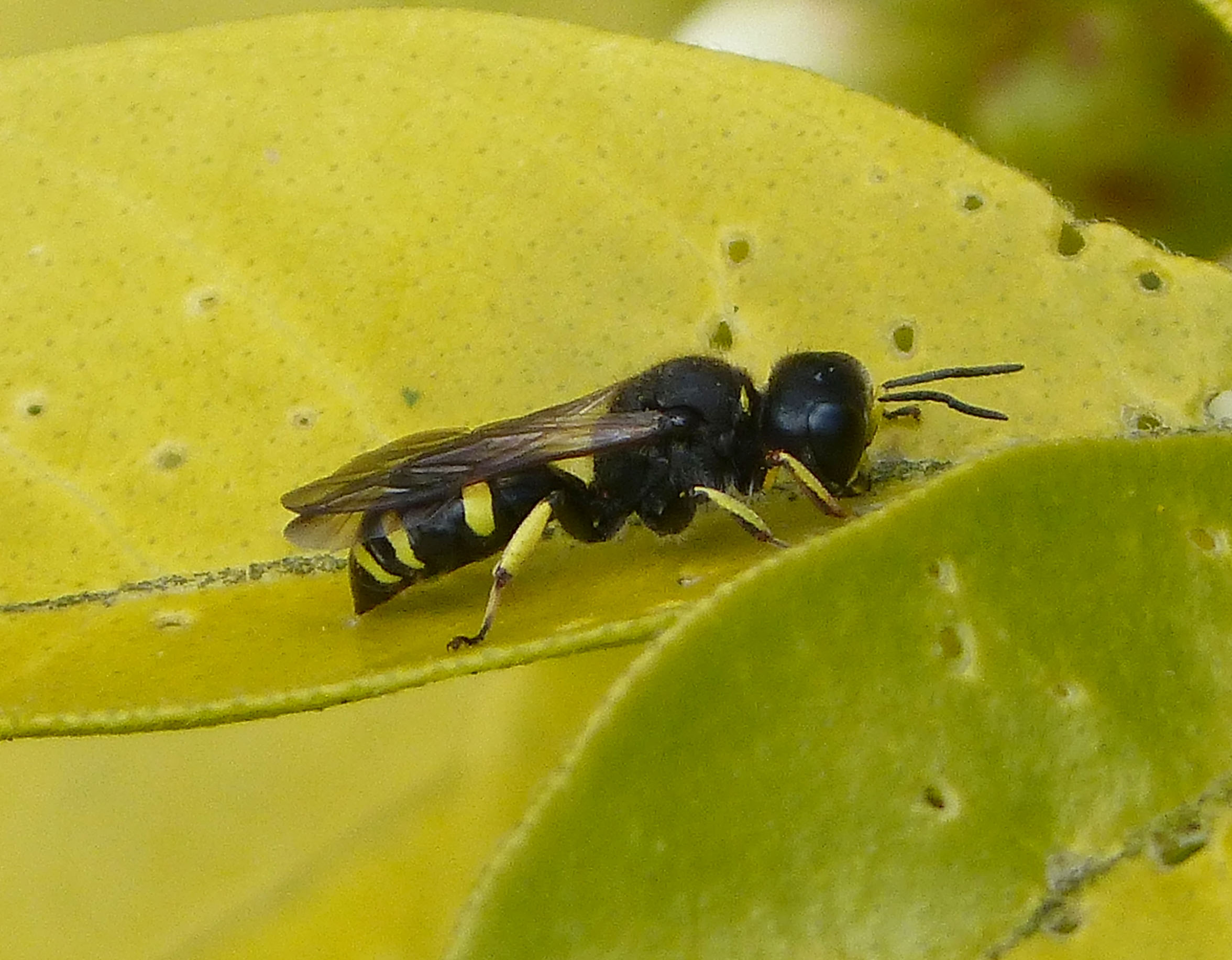

Scientific classification
- Kingdom: Animalia
- Phylum: Arthropoda
- Clade: Pancrustacea
- Class: Insecta
- Order: Hymenoptera
- Family: Crabronidae
- Genus: Ectemnius
- Species: E. continuus

Binomial name
- Ectemnius continuus (Fabricius, 1804)

Synonyms
- Crabro bisexmaculatus Viereck in J. Smith, 1910; Crabro continuus Fabricius, 1804; Crabro fuscitarsis Herrich-Schaeffer, 1841; Crabro granulatus Walker, 1871; Crabro rugosopunctatus Taschenberg, 1875; Crabro sayi Cockerell, 1910; Crabro sexmaculatus Say, 1824; Crabro vagans Fokker, 1887; Crabro vagatus F. Smith, 1869; Crabro vagus validus De Stefani Perez, 1884; Crabro validus De Stefani Perez, 1884; Crossocerus sexmaculatus (Say, 1824); Ectemnius fuscitarsis (Herrich-Schaeffer, 1841); Solenius fuscitarsis (Herrich-Schaeffer, 1841); Solenius giffardi Rohwer, 1917; Solenius sayi (Cockerell, 1910); Xestocrabro sayi (Cockerell, 1910); Xestocrabro sexmaculatus (Say, 1824)

= Ectemnius continuus =

Species of wasp

Ectemnius continuus is a species of square-headed wasp in the family Crabronidae. It is found in Africa, Europe and Northern Asia (excluding China), North America, and Southern Asia.

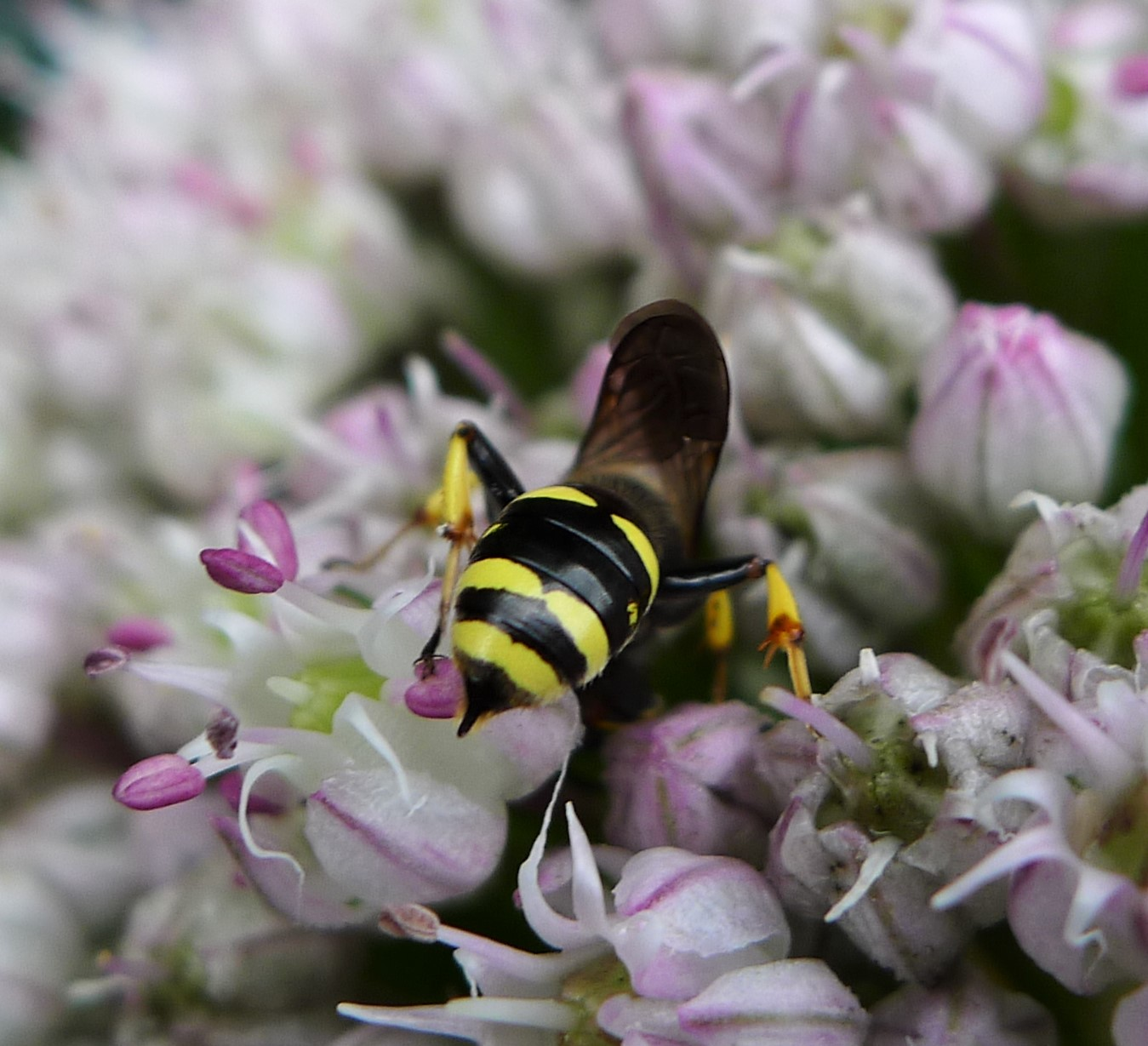

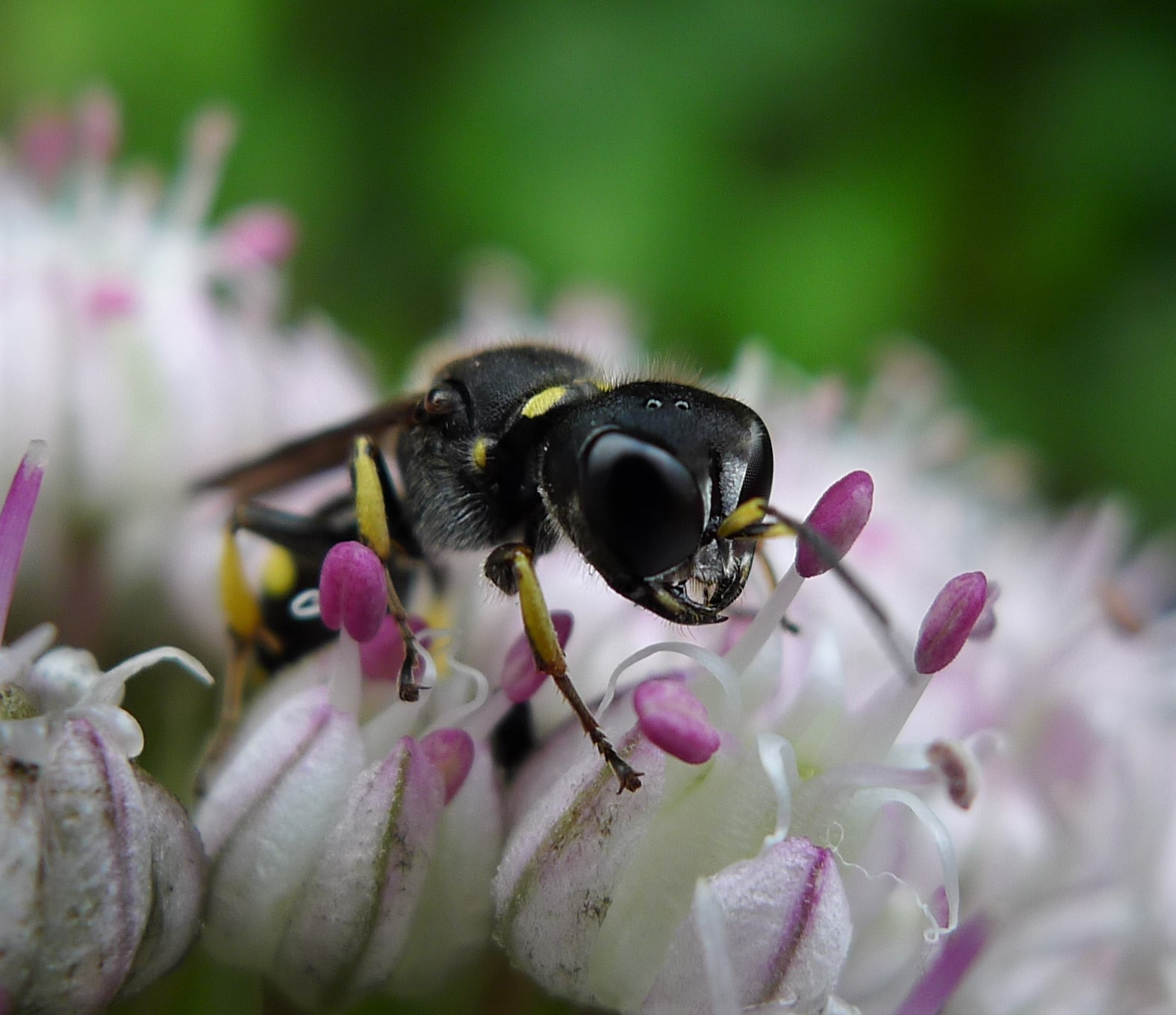

== Subspecies ==
These four subspecies belong to the species Ectemnius continuus:

- Ectemnius continuus continuus (Fabricius, 1804)
- Ectemnius continuus punctatus (Lepeletier de Saint Fargeau & Brullé, 1835)
- Ectemnius continuus rufitarsis (Dalla Torre, 1897)
- Ectemnius continuus sulphureipes (F. Smith, 1856)
