= Ectemnius ruficornis =

Scientific classification
- Kingdom: Animalia
- Phylum: Arthropoda
- Clade: Pancrustacea
- Class: Insecta
- Order: Hymenoptera
- Family: Crabronidae
- Tribe: Crabronini
- Genus: Ectemnius
- Species: E. ruficornis

Binomial name
- Ectemnius ruficornis (Zetterstedt, 1838)

Synonyms
- Clytochrysus nigrifrons (Cresson, 1865); Clytochrysus planifrons (Thomson, 1870); Clytochrysus septentrionalis (Packard, 1866); Crabro aurilabris Herrich-Schaeffer, 1841; Crabro chipsani Matsumura, 1912; Crabro contiguus Cresson, 1865; Crabro lineatotarsis Matsumura, 1911; Crabro longipalpis C. Verhoeff, 1892; Crabro nigrifrons Cresson, 1865; Crabro planifrons Thomson, 1870; Crabro ruficornis Zetterstedt, 1838; Crabro septentrionalis Packard, 1866; Ectemnius nigrifrons (Cresson, 1865); Ectemnius planifrons (Thomson, 1870); Solenius nigrifrons (Cresson, 1865); Solenius septentrionalis (Packard, 1866)

Species of wasp

Ectemnius ruficornis is a species of square-headed wasp in the family Crabronidae.

== Subspecies ==
These two subspecies belong to the species Ectemnius ruficornis:

- Ectemnius ruficornis ruficornis (Zetterstedt, 1838);
- Ectemnius ruficornis taiwanus Tsuneki, 1968.
