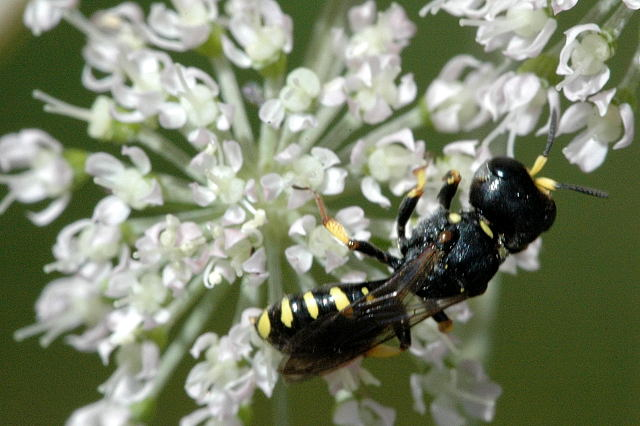
- Ectemnius dives

Scientific classification
- Kingdom: Animalia
- Phylum: Arthropoda
- Class: Insecta
- Order: Hymenoptera
- Family: Crabronidae
- Tribe: Crabronini
- Genus: Ectemnius
- Species: E. dives

Binomial name
- Ectemnius dives (Lepeletier de Saint Fargeau & Brullé, 1835)

Synonyms
- Clytochrysus octavonotatus (Lepeletier de Saint Fargeau and Brullé, 1835); Crabro alatulus Dahlbom, 1839; Crabro auratus F. Smith, 1856; Crabro cristatus Packard, 1866; Crabro cubiceps Packard, 1866; Crabro heraclei Rohwer, 1908; Crabro montanus Cresson, 1865; Crabro montivagans Strand, 1916; Crabro octavonotatus (Lepeletier de Saint Fargeau and Brullé, 1835); Crabro octonotatus (Lepeletier de Saint Fargeau and Brullé, 1835); Crabro pictipes Herrich-Schaeffer, 1841; Ectemnius dives pictipes (Herrich-Schaeffer, 1841); Ectemnius montanus (Cresson, 1865); Ectemnius pictipes (Herrich-Schaeffer, 1841); Solenius dives Lepeletier de Saint Fargeau and Brullé, 1835; Solenius montanus (Cresson, 1865); Solenius octavonotatus Lepeletier de Saint Fargeau and Brullé, 1835; Solenius octonotatus Lepeletier de Saint Fargeau and Brullé, 1835

= Ectemnius dives =

Species of wasp

Ectemnius dives is a species of square-headed wasp in the family Crabronidae. It is found in Europe and Northern Asia (excluding China), North America, and Southern Asia.
