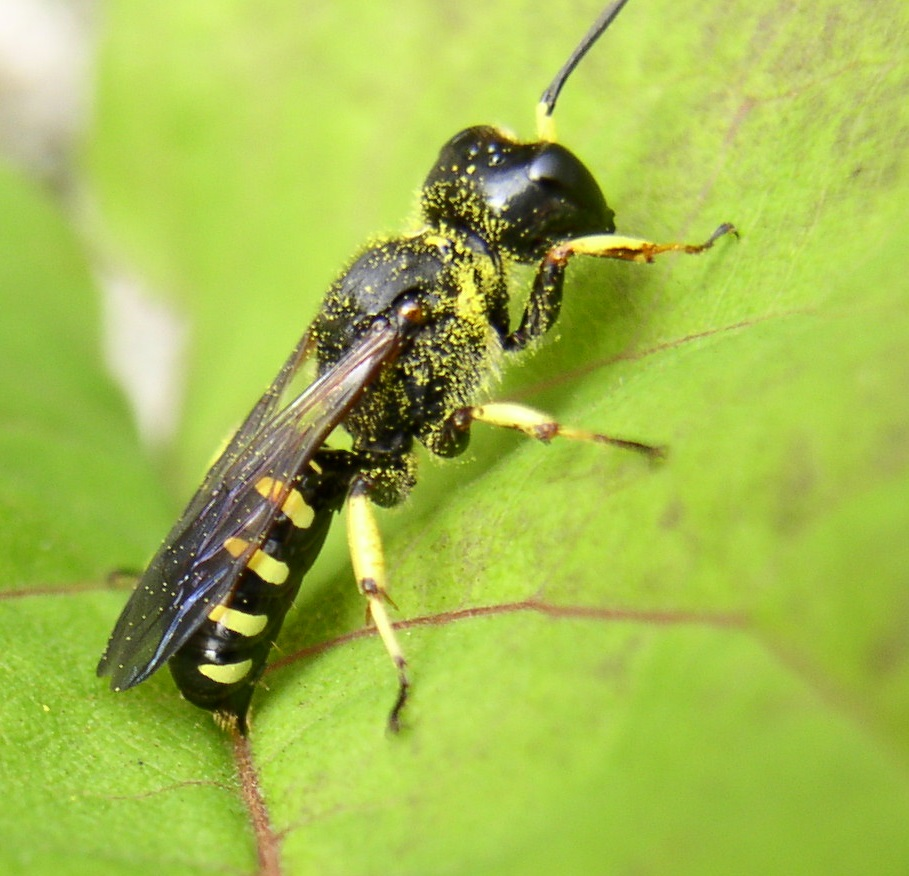

Scientific classification
- Domain: Eukaryota
- Kingdom: Animalia
- Phylum: Arthropoda
- Class: Insecta
- Order: Hymenoptera
- Family: Crabronidae
- Genus: Ectemnius
- Species: E. maculosus

Binomial name
- Ectemnius maculosus (Gmelin, 1790)

Synonyms
- Crabro frigidus F. Smith, 1856; Crabro oblongus Packard, 1866; Crabro quadrangularis Packard, 1866; Crabro quatuordecimmaculatus Packard, 1866; Crabro singularis F. Smith, 1856; Crabro trapezoideus Packard, 1866; Ectemnius oblongus (Packard, 1866); Ectemnius singularis (F. Smith, 1856); Ectemnius trapezoideus (Packard, 1866); Solenius singularis (F. Smith, 1856); Solenius trapezoideus (Packard, 1866); Vespa maculosa Gmelin, 1790

= Ectemnius maculosus =

Species of wasp

Ectemnius maculosus is a species of square-headed wasp in the family Crabronidae. Its native range comprises much of the eastern United States, as well as southeasternmost Canada. It may also be adventive elsewhere, with some reports from outside the native range in North America, Europe, and northern Asia.
