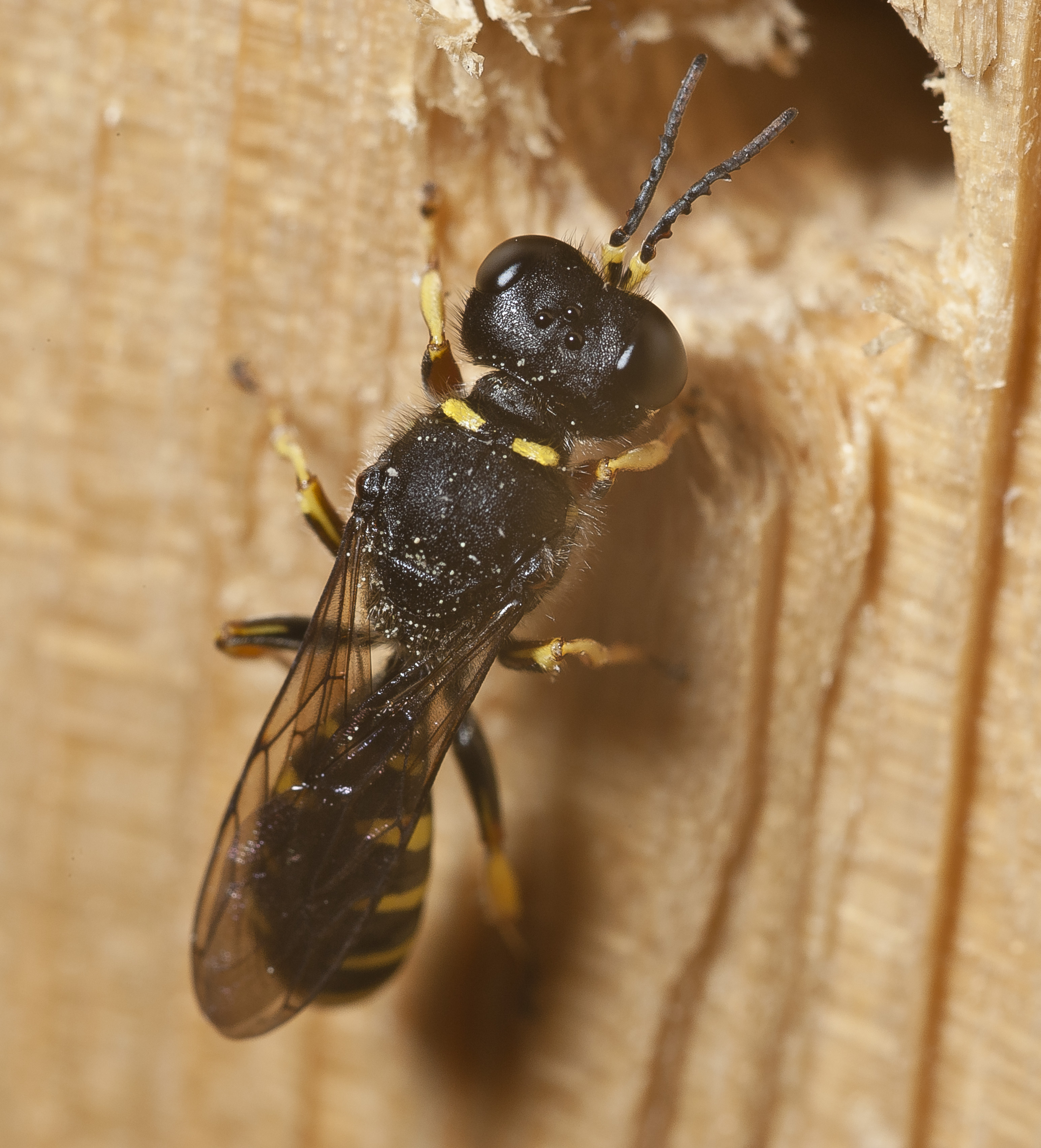
- Ectemnius cavifrons

Scientific classification
- Domain: Eukaryota
- Kingdom: Animalia
- Phylum: Arthropoda
- Class: Insecta
- Order: Hymenoptera
- Family: Crabronidae
- Subfamily: Crabroninae
- Tribe: Crabronini
- Genus: Ectemnius; Dahlbom, 1845

Type species
- Ectemnius guttatus (Vander Linden, 1829)

Species
- See text

= Ectemnius =

Genus of insects

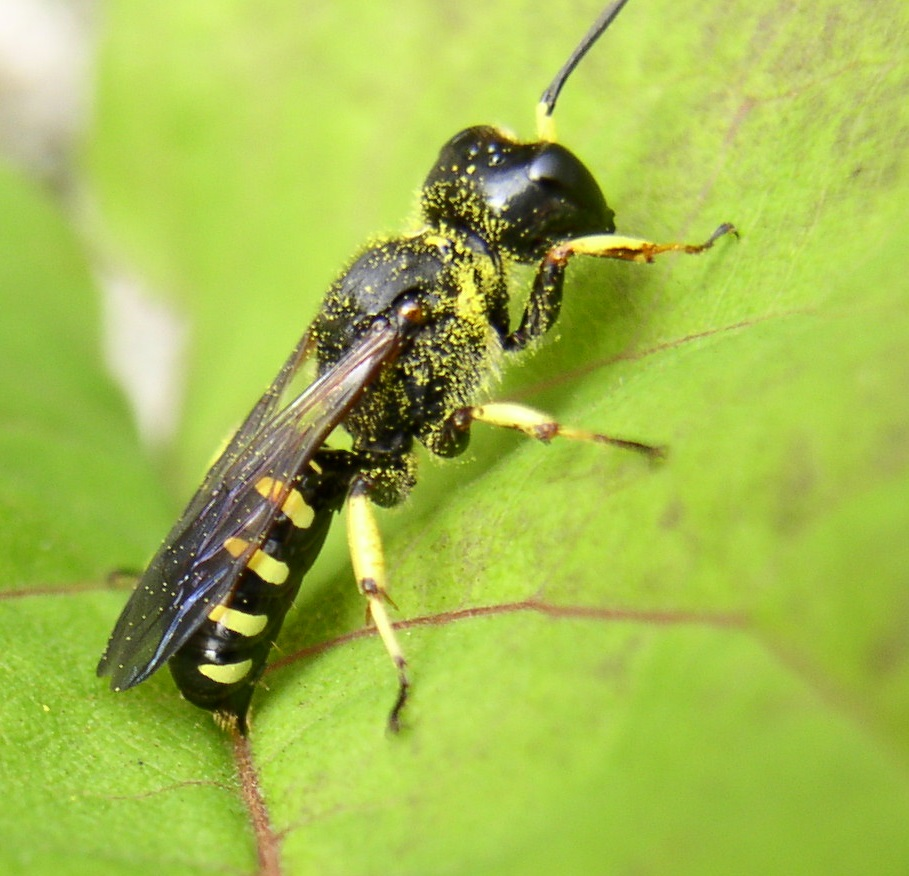
Ectemnius maculosus

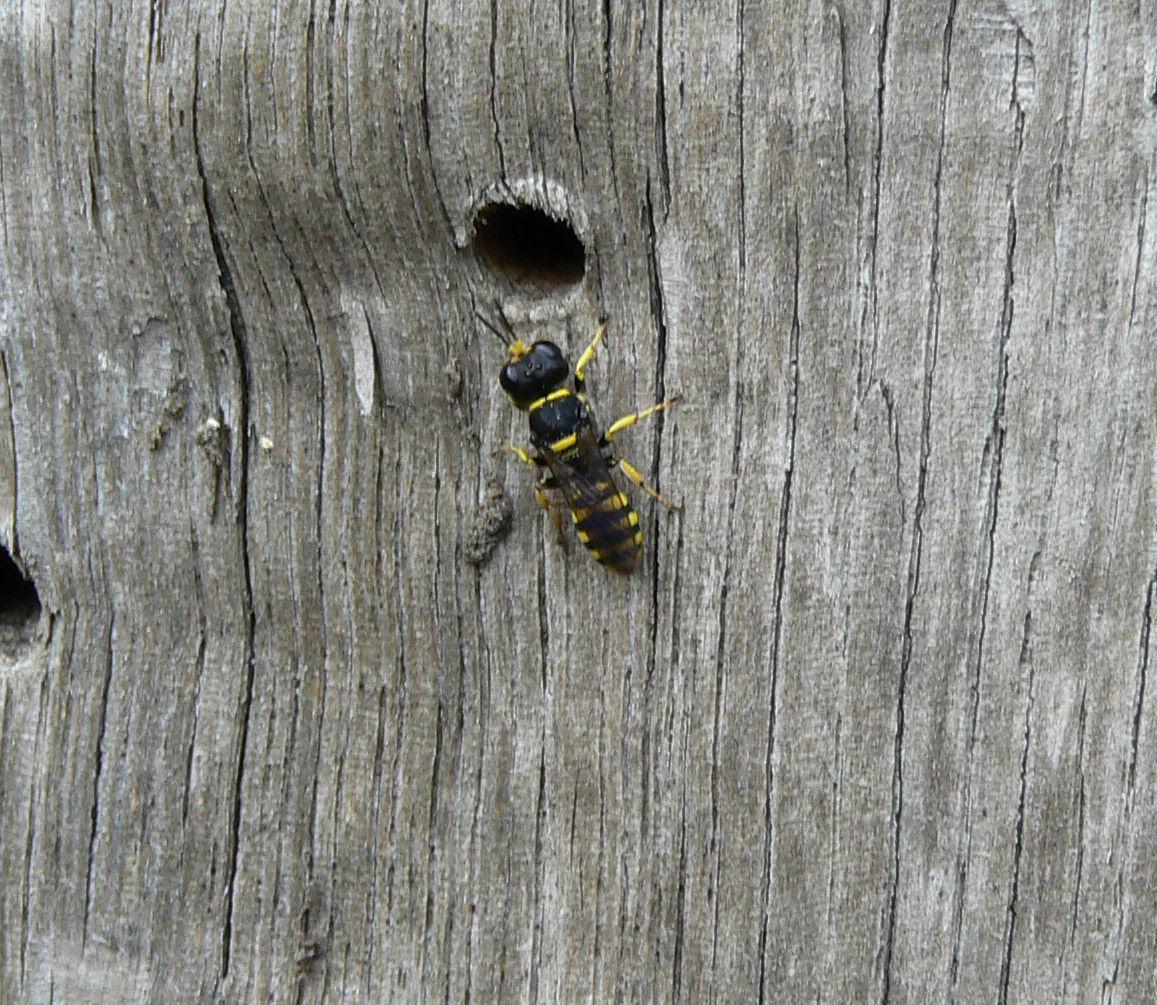
Ectemnius cephalotes at a nest entrance

Ectemnius is a genus of wasps in the family Crabronidae. 188 species are known. The genus is found around the world but Australia has only two species.

Ectemnius species excavate nest tunnels in pieces of dead wood such as stumps, fallen tree trunks, rotting logs and sometimes building timbers or posts with the help of the mandibles. Nesting aggregations can be large and dense, and sometimes more than one female has been recorded using a common nest entrance. In most species the brood is supplied with Diptera from several different families.

== Species (Europe) ==
- Ectemnius borealis (Zetterstedt 1838)
- Ectemnius cavifrons (Thomson 1870)
- Ectemnius cephalotes (Olivier 1792)
- Ectemnius confinis (Walker 1871)
- Ectemnius continuus (Fabricius 1804)
- Ectemnius crassicornis (Spinola 1808)
- Ectemnius curictensis (Mader 1940)
- Ectemnius dives (Lepeletier & Brulle 1835)
- Ectemnius fossorius (Linnaeus 1758)
- Ectemnius guttatus (Vander Linden 1829)
- Ectemnius hispanicus (Kohl 1915)
- Ectemnius hypsae (De Stefani 1894)
- Ectemnius kriechbaumeri (Kohl 1879)
- Ectemnius lapidarius (Panzer 1804)
- Ectemnius lituratus (Panzer 1804)
- Ectemnius massiliensis (Kohl 1883)
- Ectemnius meridionalis (A. Costa 1871)
- Ectemnius nigritarsus (Herrich-Schaeffer 1841)
- Ectemnius palamosi Leclercq 1964
- Ectemnius rubicola (Dufour & Perris 1840)
- Ectemnius ruficornis (Zetterstedt 1838)
- Ectemnius rugifer (Dahlbom 1845)
- Ectemnius schlettereri (Kohl 1888)
- Ectemnius sexcinctus (Fabricius 1775)
- Ectemnius spinipes (A. Morawitz 1866)
- Ectemnius walteri (Kohl 1899)

== See also ==
- List of Ectemnius species
