= List of Nomada species =

Below is a list of species in the large bee genus Nomada.

- Nomada abnormis Ducke, 1912
- Nomada abtana Tsuneki, 1973
- Nomada abyssinica Meade-Waldo, 1913
- Nomada accentifera Pérez, 1895
- Nomada accepta Cresson, 1878
- Nomada acutilabris Schwarz, 1990
- Nomada adducta Cresson, 1878
- Nomada adusta Smith, 1875
- Nomada advena Smith, 1860
- Nomada aethiopica Eardley & Schwarz, 1991
- Nomada affabilis Cresson, 1878
- Nomada africana Friese, 1911
- Nomada agrestis Fabricius, 1787
- Nomada albidemaculata Lozinski, 1922
- Nomada alboguttata Herrich-Schäffer, 1839
- Nomada alboscutellata Schwarz, 1990
- Nomada aldrichi Cockerell, 1910
- Nomada algira Mocsáry, 1883
- Nomada alpha Cockerell, 1905
- Nomada alpigena Schwarz, Gusenleitner & Mazzucco, 1999
- Nomada amabilis Radoszkowski, 1876
- Nomada amamiensis Hirashima, 1960
- Nomada amoena Cresson, 1863
- Nomada amorphae Swenk, 1913
- Nomada amurensis Radoszkowski, 1876
- Nomada angelarum Cockerell, 1903
- Nomada angulata Swenk, 1913
- Nomada annulata Smith, 1854
- Nomada anpingensis Strand, 1913
- Nomada antennata Meade-Waldo, 1913
- Nomada aprilina Swenk, 1913
- Nomada aquilarum Cockerell, 1903
- Nomada arasiana Tsuneki, 1973
- Nomada arenicola Swenk, 1913
- Nomada argentata Herrich-Schäffer, 1839
- Nomada argentea (Schwarz, 1966)
- Nomada ariasi Dusmet y Alonso, 1913
- Nomada arizonica Cockerell, 1911
- Nomada armata Herrich-Schäffer, 1839
- Nomada armatella Cockerell, 1903
- Nomada arrogans Schmiedeknecht, 1882
- Nomada articulata Smith, 1854
- Nomada ashabadensis Schwarz, 1987
- Nomada ashmeadi Cockerell, 1903
- Nomada asozuana Tsuneki, 1975
- Nomada asteris Swenk, 1913
- Nomada astori Cockerell, 1903
- Nomada aswensis Tsuneki, 1973
- Nomada atrocincta Friese, 1920
- Nomada agynia Cockerell, 1905
- Nomada atrofrontata Cockerell, 1903
- Nomada atrohirta Friese, 1923
- Nomada atroscutellaris Strand, 1921
- Nomada attenuata Cockerell, 1929
- Nomada attrita Cockerell, 1919
- Nomada augustiana Mitchell, 1962
- Nomada aurantifascia Eardley & Schwarz, 1991
- Nomada australensis Perkins, 1912
- Nomada australis Mitchell, 1962
- Nomada austriaca Schmiedeknecht, 1882
- Nomada autumnalis Mitchell, 1962
- Nomada avalonica Cockerell, 1938
- Nomada azaleae Mitchell, 1962
- Nomada aztecorum Cockerell, 1903
- Nomada babai Tsuneki, 1986
- Nomada babiyi Schwarz & Standfuss, 2007
- Nomada baccata Smith, 1844
- Nomada bakeri Cockerell, 1915
- Nomada baldiniana Benzi, 1892
- Nomada banahaonis Cockerell, 1915
- Nomada banksi Cockerell, 1907
- Nomada barbilabris Pérez, 1895
- Nomada barcelonensis Cockerell, 1917
- Nomada basalis Herrich-Schäffer, 1839
- Nomada beaumonti Schwarz, 1967
- Nomada belfragei Cresson, 1878
- Nomada bella Cresson, 1863
- Nomada besseyi Swenk, 1913
- Nomada bethunei Cockerell, 1903
- Nomada beulahensis Cockerell, 1903
- Nomada bicellula Schwarz, 1990
- Nomada bicellularis Ducke, 1908
- Nomada bicrista Swenk, 1913
- Nomada bifasciata Olivier, 1811
- Nomada bifurcata Cockerell, 1903
- Nomada biguttata Friese, 1909
- Nomada biroi Friese, 1909
- Nomada bisetosa Swenk, 1913
- Nomada bisignata Say, 1824
- Nomada bispinosa Mocsáry, 1883
- Nomada blepharipes Schmiedeknecht, 1882
- Nomada bluethgeni Stoeckhert, 1943
- Nomada bohartorum Moalif, 1988
- Nomada bolivari Dusmet y Alonso, 1913
- Nomada bonaerensis Holmberg, 1886
- Nomada bouceki Kocourek, 1985
- Nomada braunsiana Schmiedeknecht, 1882
- Nomada brevis Saunders, 1908
- Nomada breviuscula Schwarz, 1990
- Nomada brewsterae Broemeling, 1989
- Nomada californiae Cockerell, 1903
- Nomada calimorpha Schmiedeknecht, 1882
- Nomada calloptera Cockerell, 1918
- Nomada calloxantha Cockerell, 1921
- Nomada capillata Mitchell, 1962
- Nomada carinicauda Cockerell, 1921
- Nomada carnifex Mocsáry, 1883
- Nomada carthaginensis Dusmet y Alonso, 1932
- Nomada caspia Morawitz, 1895
- Nomada castellana Dusmet y Alonso, 1913
- Nomada ceanothi Cockerell, 1907
- Nomada centenarii Dusmet y Alonso, 1932
- Nomada ceylonica Cameron, 1897
- Nomada cherkesiana Mavromoustakis, 1955
- Nomada chrysopyga Morawitz, 1871
- Nomada citrina Cresson, 1878
- Nomada civilis Cresson, 1878
- Nomada clarescens Cockerell, 1921
- Nomada clarkii Cockerell, 1903
- Nomada cleopatra Schwarz, 1989
- Nomada collarae Schwarz, 1964
- Nomada collinsiana Cockerell, 1905
- Nomada coloradella Cockerell, 1905
- Nomada coloradensis Cockerell, 1903
- Nomada comparata Cockerell, 1911
- Nomada composita Mitchell, 1962
- Nomada concessa Cockerell, 1919
- Nomada concinnula Cockerell, 1921
- Nomada concolor Schmiedeknecht, 1882
- Nomada confinis Schmiedeknecht, 1882
- Nomada confusa Schwarz & Gusenleitner, 2004
- Nomada conjungens Herrich-Schäffer, 1839
- Nomada connectens Pérez, 1884
- Nomada consobrina Dufour, 1841
- Nomada conspicua Smith, 1864
- Nomada coquilletti Cockerell, 1903
- Nomada corcyraea Schmiedeknecht, 1882
- Nomada cordilabris Schwarz, 1990
- Nomada cordillera Eardley & Schwarz, 1991
- Nomada cordleyi Cockerell, 1903
- Nomada coronata Pérez, 1896
- Nomada corvallisensis Cockerell, 1903
- Nomada costalis Brèthes, 1909
- Nomada costaricensis Schrottky, 1920
- Nomada coxalis Morawitz, 1877
- Nomada crawfordi Cockerell, 1905
- Nomada cressonii Robertson, 1893
- Nomada cristata Pérez, 1896
- Nomada crotchii Cresson, 1878
- Nomada crucis Cockerell, 1903
- Nomada crudelis Cresson, 1878
- Nomada cruenta Schmiedeknecht, 1882
- Nomada cubensis Cresson, 1865
- Nomada cuneata (Robertson, 1903)
- Nomada curvispinosa Schwarz, 1981
- Nomada custeriana Cockerell, 1911
- Nomada cymbalariae Cockerell, 1906
- Nomada cypriaca Schwarz, 1999
- Nomada cypricola Mavromoustakis, 1955
- Nomada dahli Friese, 1912
- Nomada davidsoni Cockerell, 1903
- Nomada debilis Timberlake, 1954
- Nomada decempunctata Cockerell, 1903
- Nomada decepta Mitchell, 1962
- Nomada dentariae (Robertson, 1903)
- Nomada denticulata Robertson, 1902
- Nomada depressa Cresson, 1863
- Nomada detrita Mitchell, 1962
- Nomada diacantha Schwarz, 1981
- Nomada dilucida Cresson, 1878
- Nomada dira Schmiedeknecht, 1882
- Nomada discedens Pérez, 1884
- Nomada discicollis Morawitz, 1875
- Nomada discrepans Schmiedeknecht, 1882
- Nomada dissessa Cockerell, 1920
- Nomada distinguenda Morawitz, 1874
- Nomada dives Erichson, 1849
- Nomada dolosa Mocsáry, 1883
- Nomada dreisbachi Mitchell, 1962
- Nomada dreisbachorum Moalif, 1988
- Nomada dubia Eversmann, 1852
- Nomada duplex Smith, 1854
- Nomada durangoae Broemeling, 1989
- Nomada dybovskij Radoszkowski, 1876
- Nomada ecarinata Morawitz, 1888
- Nomada ednae Cockerell, 1907
- Nomada edwardsii Cresson, 1878
- Nomada electa Cresson, 1863
- Nomada electella Cockerell, 1903
- Nomada elegantula Cockerell, 1903
- Nomada elrodi Cockerell, 1903
- Nomada emarginata Morawitz, 1877
- Nomada eos Schmiedeknecht, 1882
- Nomada erigeronis Robertson, 1897
- Nomada errans Lepeletier, 1841
- Nomada erythra Mitai, Hirashima & Tadauchi, 2007
- Nomada erythraea Dalla Torre, 1896
- Nomada erythrocephala Morawitz, 1870
- Nomada erythrochroa Cockerell, 1903
- Nomada erythrospila Cockerell, 1916
- Nomada esana Tsuneki, 1973
- Nomada exheredans Cockerell, 1919
- Nomada eximia Eardley & Schwarz, 1991
- Nomada fabriciana (Linné, 1767)
- Nomada facilis Schwarz, 1967
- Nomada fallax Pérez, 1913
- Nomada fedtschenkoi Morawitz, 1875
- Nomada felici Schwarz, 1977
- Nomada femoralis Morawitz, 1869
- Nomada fenestrata Lepeletier, 1841
- Nomada ferghanica Morawitz, 1875
- Nomada ferruginata (Linné, 1767)
- Nomada fervens Smith, 1873
- Nomada fervida Smith, 1854
- Nomada festiva Cresson, 1863
- Nomada flammigera Cockerell, 1906
- Nomada flava Panzer, 1798
- Nomada flavescens Friese, 1917
- Nomada flaviceps Cresson, 1865
- Nomada flavigenis Schwarz & Standfuss, 2007
- Nomada flavilabris Morawitz, 1875
- Nomada flavinervis Brullé, 1832
- Nomada flavoguttata (Kirby, 1802)
- Nomada flavopicta (Kirby, 1802)
- Nomada flavozonata Nurse, 1902
- Nomada florilega Lovell & Cockerell, 1905
- Nomada fontis Cockerell, 1910
- Nomada formula Viereck, 1902
- Nomada fragariae Mitchell, 1962
- Nomada fragilis Cresson, 1878
- Nomada frankei Cockerell, 1929
- Nomada frieseana Cockerell, 1904
- Nomada fucata Panzer, 1798
- Nomada fukuiana Tsuneki, 1973
- Nomada fulvicornis Fabricius, 1793
- Nomada furva Panzer, 1798
- Nomada furvoides Stoeckhert, 1944
- Nomada fusca Schwarz, 1986
- Nomada fuscicincta Swenk, 1915
- Nomada fuscicornis Nylander, 1848
- Nomada fuscipennis Lepeletier, 1841
- Nomada galloisi Yasumatsu & Hirashima, 1953
- Nomada garciana Cockerell, 1907
- Nomada gibbosa Viereck, 1905
- Nomada gigas Friese, 1905
- Nomada gillettei Cockerell, 1905
- Nomada ginran Tsuneki, 1973
- Nomada glaberrima Schmiedeknecht, 1882
- Nomada glabriventris Schwarz, 1990
- Nomada glaucopis Pérez, 1890
- Nomada goodeniana (Kirby, 1802)
- Nomada gracilicornis Morawitz, 1895
- Nomada gracilis Cresson, 1863
- Nomada graenicheri Cockerell, 1905
- Nomada grandior Friese, 1921
- Nomada grandis Cresson, 1875
- Nomada gransassoi Schwarz, 1986
- Nomada grayi Cockerell, 1903
- Nomada gribodoi Schmiedeknecht, 1882
- Nomada gruenwaldti Schwarz, 1979
- Nomada guichardi Schwarz, 1981
- Nomada guichardiana Eardley & Schwarz, 1991
- Nomada gusenleitneri Schwarz, 1981
- Nomada gutierreziae Cockerell, 1896
- Nomada guttulata Schenck, 1861
- Nomada gyangensis Cockerell, 1911
- Nomada hackoda Tsuneki, 1973
- Nomada hakonensis Cockerell, 1911
- Nomada hakusana Tsuneki, 1973
- Nomada hammarstroemi Morawitz, 1888
- Nomada hararensis Meade-Waldo, 1913
- Nomada harimensis Cockerell, 1914
- Nomada heiligbrodtii Cresson, 1878
- Nomada hemphilli Cockerell, 1903
- Nomada henningeri Evans, 1972
- Nomada hera Schwarz, 1965
- Nomada hesperia Cockerell, 1903
- Nomada heterosticta Cockerell, 1921
- Nomada hirticeps Pérez, 1895
- Nomada hirtipes Pérez, 1884
- Nomada hirtiventris Schwarz, 1990
- Nomada hispanica Dusmet y Alonso, 1913
- Nomada hondurasica Cockerell, 1949
- Nomada hoodiana Cockerell, 1903
- Nomada hummeli Alfken, 1936
- Nomada hungarica Dalla Torre & Friese, 1894
- Nomada hurdi Evans, 1972
- Nomada hydrophylli Swenk, 1915
- Nomada ibanezi Dusmet y Alonso, 1915
- Nomada icazti Tsuneki, 1976
- Nomada idahoensis Swenk, 1913
- Nomada illinoensis Robertson, 1900
- Nomada illustris Schmiedeknecht, 1882
- Nomada imbricata Smith, 1854
- Nomada immaculata Morawitz, 1874
- Nomada imperialis Schmiedeknecht, 1882
- Nomada incisa Schmiedeknecht, 1882
- Nomada indusata Mitchell, 1962
- Nomada inepta Mitchell, 1962
- Nomada inermis Pérez, 1895
- Nomada infrequens Smith, 1879
- Nomada insignipes Schmiedeknecht, 1882
- Nomada insularis Smith, 1864
- Nomada integerrima Dalla Torre, 1896
- Nomada integra Brullé, 1832
- Nomada interruptella Fowler, 1902
- Nomada issikii Yasumatsu, 1939
- Nomada italica Dalla Torre & Friese, 1894
- Nomada itamera Cockerell, 1910
- Nomada jamaicensis Cockerell, 1912
- Nomada jammuensis Schwarz, 1990
- Nomada japonica Smith, 1873
- Nomada jaramense Dusmet y Alonso, 1913
- Nomada javaensis Schwarz & Gusenleitner, 2004
- Nomada javanica Friese, 1909
- Nomada jennei Cockerell, 1906
- Nomada jocularis Cresson, 1879
- Nomada kaguya Hirashima, 1953
- Nomada keroanensis Pérez, 1895
- Nomada kervilleana Pérez, 1913
- Nomada kincaidiana Cockerell, 1903
- Nomada kingstonensis Mitchell, 1962
- Nomada kinosukei Tsuneki, 1973
- Nomada klamathensis Fox, 1926
- Nomada kocoureki Schwarz, 1987
- Nomada kohli Schmiedeknecht, 1882
- Nomada koikensis Tsuneki, 1973
- Nomada komarowi Radoszkowski, 1893
- Nomada koreana Cockerell, 1926
- Nomada kornosica Mavromoustakis, 1958
- Nomada krombeini Schwarz, 1966
- Nomada krugii Cresson, 1878
- Nomada kusdasi Schwarz, 1981
- Nomada ladakhiensis Schwarz, 1990
- Nomada lagrecai Noble, 1990
- Nomada lamarensis Cockerell, 1905
- Nomada lamellata Schwarz, 1977
- Nomada laramiensis Swenk, 1913
- Nomada lateritia Mocsáry, 1883
- Nomada lathburiana (Kirby, 1802)
- Nomada laticrus Mocsáry, 1883
- Nomada latifrons Cockerell, 1903
- Nomada lehighensis Cockerell, 1903
- Nomada lepida Cresson, 1863
- Nomada leucophthalma (Kirby, 1802)
- Nomada leucotricha Strand, 1914
- Nomada leucozona Rodeck, 1931
- Nomada lewisi Cockerell, 1903
- Nomada libata Cresson, 1878
- Nomada limassolica Mavromoustakis, 1955
- Nomada limata Cresson, 1878
- Nomada linsenmaieri Schwarz, 1974
- Nomada linsleyi Evans, 1972
- Nomada lippiae Cockerell, 1903
- Nomada litigiosa Gribodo, 1893
- Nomada longicornis Friese, 1920
- Nomada louisianae Cockerell, 1903
- Nomada lucidula Schwarz, 1967
- Nomada lucilla Nurse, 1902
- Nomada lusca Smith, 1854
- Nomada lutea Eversmann, 1852
- Nomada luteola Olivier, 1811
- Nomada luteoloides Robertson, 1895
- Nomada luteopicta Cockerell, 1905
- Nomada maculata Cresson, 1863
- Nomada maculicornis Pérez, 1884
- Nomada maculifrons Smith, 1869
- Nomada maculipennis (Cameron, 1902)
- Nomada maculiventer Swenk, 1915
- Nomada makilingensis Cockerell, 1915
- Nomada malayana Cameron, 1909
- Nomada malonella Cockerell, 1910
- Nomada malonina Cockerell, 1910
- Nomada margelanica Schwarz, 1987
- Nomada marginella Cockerell, 1903
- Nomada marshamella (Kirby, 1802)
- Nomada martinella Cockerell, 1903
- Nomada mauritanica Lepeletier, 1841
- Nomada mavromoustakisi Schwarz & Standfuss, 2007
- Nomada mckenziei Timberlake & Cockerell, 1937
- Nomada media Mitchell, 1962
- Nomada mediana Swenk, 1913
- Nomada melanoptera Cockerell, 1921
- Nomada melanopyga Schmiedeknecht, 1882
- Nomada melanosoma Cockerell, 1916
- Nomada melanura Mocsáry, 1883
- Nomada melathoracica Imhoff, 1834
- Nomada melliventris Cresson, 1878
- Nomada mendica Mitchell, 1962
- Nomada merceti Alfken, 1909
- Nomada mexicana Cresson, 1878
- Nomada micheneri Schwarz & Gusenleitner, 2004
- Nomada micronycha Pérez, 1902
- Nomada mimus (Cockerell, 1916)
- Nomada mindanaonis Cockerell, 1915
- Nomada miniata Smith, 1854
- Nomada minima Mitchell, 1962
- Nomada minor Gmelin, 1790
- Nomada mitchelli Cockerell, 1911
- Nomada mocsaryi Schmiedeknecht, 1882
- Nomada moeschleri Alfken, 1913
- Nomada monozana Friese, 1920
- Nomada montezumia Smith, 1879
- Nomada montverna Tsuneki, 1973
- Nomada moravitzii Radoszkowski, 1876
- Nomada moricei Friese, 1899
- Nomada morrisoni Cresson, 1878
- Nomada multicolor Ducke, 1911
- Nomada munakatai Tsuneki, 1973
- Nomada munda Cresson, 1878
- Nomada mutabilis Morawitz, 1870
- Nomada mutans Cockerell, 1910
- Nomada mutica Morawitz, 1872
- Nomada nausicaa Schmiedeknecht, 1882
- Nomada navasi Dusmet y Alonso, 1913
- Nomada neomexicana Cockerell, 1903
- Nomada nepalensis Schwarz, 1990
- Nomada nesiotica Mavromoustakis, 1958
- Nomada nigrescens Friese, 1921
- Nomada nigrociliata Swenk, 1913
- Nomada nigrocincta Smith, 1879
- Nomada nigrofasciata Swenk, 1913
- Nomada nigroflavida Gribodo, 1894
- Nomada nigrovaria Pérez, 1896
- Nomada nipponica Yasumatsu & Hirashima, 1951
- Nomada nitida Schwarz, 1977
- Nomada nitidiceps Cockerell, 1931
- Nomada nobilis Herrich-Schäffer, 1839
- Nomada noskiewiczi Schwarz, 1966
- Nomada numida Lepeletier, 1841
- Nomada nuptura Dusmet y Alonso, 1913
- Nomada obliquella Fowler, 1902
- Nomada obliterata Cresson, 1863
- Nomada obscura Zetterstedt, 1838
- Nomada obscurella Fowler, 1902
- Nomada obscuriventris Schwarz, 1990
- Nomada obtusata Swenk, 1915
- Nomada obtusifrons Nylander, 1848
- Nomada ochlerata Mitchell, 1962
- Nomada ochrohirta Swenk, 1913
- Nomada oculata Friese, 1921
- Nomada odontocera Cockerell, 1916
- Nomada odontophora Kohl, 1905
- Nomada okamotonis Matsumura, 1912
- Nomada okubira Tsuneki, 1973
- Nomada opaca Alfken, 1913
- Nomada opacella Timberlake, 1954
- Nomada opposita Cresson, 1878
- Nomada oralis Schwarz, 1981
- Nomada orba Mitchell, 1962
- Nomada orbitalis Pérez, 1913
- Nomada orcusella Cockerell, 1910
- Nomada oregonica Cockerell, 1903
- Nomada ornithica Cockerell, 1906
- Nomada orophila Cockerell, 1921
- Nomada ortegai Dusmet y Alonso, 1915
- Nomada osborni Cockerell, 1911
- Nomada ovaliceps Schwarz, 1981
- Nomada ovata (Robertson, 1903)
- Nomada pacifica Tsuneki, 1973
- Nomada packardiella Cockerell, 1906
- Nomada palavanica Cockerell, 1919
- Nomada pallidella Cockerell, 1905
- Nomada pallidelutea Swenk, 1915
- Nomada pallidenotata Schmiedeknecht, 1882
- Nomada pallidipicta Swenk, 1913
- Nomada pallispinosa Schwarz, 1967
- Nomada palmeni Morawitz, 1888
- Nomada pampicola Holmberg, 1886
- Nomada panamensis Michener, 1954
- Nomada panurgina Morawitz, 1869
- Nomada panurginoides Saunders, 1908
- Nomada panzeri Lepeletier, 1841
- Nomada papuana Cockerell, 1933
- Nomada parallela Swenk, 1913
- Nomada parata Cresson, 1878
- Nomada parkeri Evans, 1972
- Nomada parva Robertson, 1900
- Nomada pascoensis Cockerell, 1903
- Nomada pastoralis Schmiedeknecht, 1882
- Nomada pecosensis Cockerell, 1903
- Nomada pectoralis Morawitz, 1877
- Nomada pekingensis Tsuneki, 1986
- Nomada penangensis Cockerell, 1920
- Nomada perbella (Viereck, 1905)
- Nomada perezi Dusmet y Alonso, 1913
- Nomada perivincta Cockerell, 1905
- Nomada perplexa Cresson, 1863
- Nomada perplexans Cockerell, 1910
- Nomada pervasor Cockerell, 1919
- Nomada pesenkoi Schwarz, 1987
- Nomada physura Cockerell, 1903
- Nomada piccioliana Magretti, 1883
- Nomada picticauda Cockerell, 1929
- Nomada pictiscutum Alfken, 1927
- Nomada pilipes (Cresson, 1865)
- Nomada piliventris Morawitz, 1877
- Nomada placida Cresson, 1863
- Nomada placitensis Cockerell, 1903
- Nomada platythorax Schwarz, 1981
- Nomada pleurosticta Herrich-Schäffer, 1839
- Nomada plumosa Gribodo, 1894
- Nomada podagrica Gribodo, 1894
- Nomada polemediana Mavromoustakis, 1957
- Nomada polyacantha Pérez, 1895
- Nomada polybioides Ducke, 1908
- Nomada polyodonta Cockerell, 1920
- Nomada portalensis Broemeling, 1989
- Nomada posthuma Blüthgen, 1949
- Nomada priesneri Schwarz, 1965
- Nomada priscilla Nurse, 1902
- Nomada propinqua Schmiedeknecht, 1882
- Nomada proxima Cresson, 1863
- Nomada pruinosa Pérez, 1895
- Nomada pseudops Cockerell, 1905
- Nomada psilocera Kohl, 1908
- Nomada pulawskii Tsuneki, 1973
- Nomada pulchra Arnold, 1888
- Nomada pulsatillae Cockerell, 1906
- Nomada pusilla Lepeletier, 1841
- Nomada putnami Cresson, 1876
- Nomada pygidialis Schwarz, 1981
- Nomada pygmaea Cresson, 1863
- Nomada pyrifera Cockerell, 1918
- Nomada pyrrha Cockerell, 1916
- Nomada quadrifasciata Schwarz, 1981
- Nomada quinquefasciata Schwarz, 1981
- Nomada radoszkowskii Lozinski, 1922
- Nomada rhenana Morawitz, 1872
- Nomada rhinula Strand, 1914
- Nomada rhodalis Cockerell, 1903
- Nomada rhodomelas Cockerell, 1903
- Nomada rhodosoma Cockerell, 1903
- Nomada rhodotricha Cockerell, 1903
- Nomada rhodoxantha Cockerell, 1905
- Nomada ridingsii Cresson, 1878
- Nomada rivalis Cresson, 1878
- Nomada roberjeotiana Panzer, 1799
- Nomada robertsonella Cockerell, 1903
- Nomada rodecki Mitchell, 1962
- Nomada rohweri Cockerell, 1906
- Nomada rostrata Herrich-Schäffer, 1839
- Nomada rubi Swenk, 1915
- Nomada rubicunda Olivier, 1811
- Nomada rubiginosa Pérez, 1884
- Nomada rubinii (Rayment, 1930)
- Nomada rubra Smith, 1849
- Nomada rubrella Cockerell, 1905
- Nomada rubrica Provancher, 1896
- Nomada rubricollis Schwarz, 1967
- Nomada rubricosa Eversmann, 1852
- Nomada rubricoxa Schwarz, 1977
- Nomada rubriventris Schwarz, 1981
- Nomada ruficollis Morawitz, 1875
- Nomada ruficornis (Linnaeus, 1758)
- Nomada rufipes Fabricius, 1793
- Nomada rufoabdominalis Schwarz, 1963
- Nomada rugicollis Friese, 1917
- Nomada ruidosensis Cockerell, 1903
- Nomada sabaensis Tsuneki, 1973
- Nomada sabulosa Radoszkowski, 1876
- Nomada salicicola Swenk, 1913
- Nomada salicis Robertson, 1900
- Nomada saltillo Broemeling, 1988
- Nomada sanctaecrucis Cockerell, 1903
- Nomada sandacana Cockerell, 1920
- Nomada sanguinea Smith, 1854
- Nomada sarta Morawitz, 1875
- Nomada sayi Robertson, 1893
- Nomada scheuchli Schwarz & Standfuss, 2007
- Nomada schulthessi Schwarz, 1999
- Nomada schwarzi Cockerell, 1903
- Nomada scita Cresson, 1878
- Nomada scitiformis Cockerell, 1903
- Nomada secessa Cockerell, 1911
- Nomada sedi Cockerell, 1919
- Nomada semirugosa Cockerell, 1929
- Nomada semiscita Cockerell, 1904
- Nomada semisuavis Cockerell, 1910
- Nomada sempiterna Morawitz, 1894
- Nomada seneciophila Mitchell, 1962
- Nomada serricornis Pérez, 1884
- Nomada sexfasciata Panzer, 1799
- Nomada sheppardana (Kirby, 1802)
- Nomada shirakii Yasumatsu & Hirashima, 1951
- Nomada shoyozana Tsuneki, 1986
- Nomada siccorum Cockerell, 1919
- Nomada siciliensis Dalla Torre & Friese, 1894
- Nomada sicula Schwarz, 1974
- Nomada signata Jurine, 1807
- Nomada silvicola Tsuneki, 1973
- Nomada similis Morawitz, 1872
- Nomada simplicicoxa Swenk, 1915
- Nomada siouxensis Swenk, 1913
- Nomada skinneri Cockerell, 1908
- Nomada snowii Cresson, 1878
- Nomada sobrina Mitchell, 1962
- Nomada solitaria Smith, 1854
- Nomada sophiarum Cockerell, 1903
- Nomada sphaerogaster Cockerell, 1903
- Nomada spinicoxa Schwarz, 1987
- Nomada standfussi Schwarz, 2007
- Nomada sternalis Pérez, 1902
- Nomada stigma Fabricius, 1804
- Nomada stoeckherti Pittioni, 1951
- Nomada striata Fabricius, 1793
- Nomada suavis Cresson, 1878
- Nomada subaccepta Cockerell, 1907
- Nomada subangusta Cockerell, 1903
- Nomada subgracilis Cockerell, 1903
- Nomada subnigrocincta Swenk, 1915
- Nomada subpacata Swenk, 1913
- Nomada subpetiolata Smith, 1879
- Nomada subrubi Swenk, 1915
- Nomada subrutila Lovell & Cockerell, 1905
- Nomada subscopifera Ducke, 1908
- Nomada subsimilis Cockerell, 1903
- Nomada subvicinalis Cockerell, 1903
- Nomada subvirescens Morawitz, 1875
- Nomada succincta Panzer, 1798
- Nomada suda Cresson, 1879
- Nomada suffossa Cockerell, 1922
- Nomada sulphurata Smith, 1854
- Nomada superba Cresson, 1863
- Nomada sutepensis Cockerell, 1929
- Nomada swenki Schwarz, 1966
- Nomada sybarita Schmiedeknecht, 1882
- Nomada symphyti Stoeckhert, 1930
- Nomada taicho Tsuneki, 1973
- Nomada taraxacella Cockerell, 1903
- Nomada temmasana Tsuneki, 1986
- Nomada tenella Mocsáry, 1883
- Nomada tenuicornis Cockerell, 1949
- Nomada tepoztlan Moalif, 1988
- Nomada tesaceobalteata Cameron, 1910
- Nomada texana Cresson, 1872
- Nomada thersites Schmiedeknecht, 1882
- Nomada tibialis Cresson, 1865
- Nomada tiendang Tsuneki, 1986
- Nomada timberlakei Broemeling, 1989
- Nomada tintinnabulum Cockerell, 1903
- Nomada towada Tsuneki, 1973
- Nomada townesi Mitchell, 1962
- Nomada transitoria Schmiedeknecht, 1882
- Nomada trapeziformis Schmiedeknecht, 1882
- Nomada trapidoi Michener, 1954
- Nomada tricurta Swenk, 1915
- Nomada tridentirostris Dours, 1873
- Nomada trispinosa Schmiedeknecht, 1882
- Nomada truttarum Cockerell, 1909
- Nomada tsunekiana Schwarz, 1999
- Nomada turneri Meade-Waldo, 1913
- Nomada tyrrellensis Mitchell, 1962
- Nomada uhleri Cockerell, 1905
- Nomada ulsterensis Mitchell, 1962
- Nomada ultima Cockerell, 1903
- Nomada ultimella Cockerell, 1903
- Nomada undulaticornis Cockerell, 1906
- Nomada unispinosa Schwarz, 1981
- Nomada utahensis Moalif, 1988
- Nomada utensis Swenk, 1913
- Nomada valida Smith, 1854
- Nomada vallesina Cockerell, 1906
- Nomada vegana Cockerell, 1903
- Nomada velutina Swenk, 1913
- Nomada verecunda Cresson, 1879
- Nomada verna Schmiedeknecht, 1882
- Nomada vernonensis Cockerell, 1916
- Nomada vexator Cockerell, 1909
- Nomada vicina Cresson, 1863
- Nomada vicinalis Cresson, 1878
- Nomada victrix Cockerell, 1911
- Nomada vierecki Cockerell, 1903
- Nomada villosa Thomson, 1870
- Nomada vincta Say, 1837
- Nomada vitticollis Cresson, 1878
- Nomada vulpis Cockerell, 1921
- Nomada waltoni Cockerell, 1910
- Nomada washingtoni Cockerell, 1903
- Nomada wheeleri Cockerell, 1903
- Nomada whiteheadi Eardley & Schwarz, 1991
- Nomada wickwari Meade-Waldo, 1913
- Nomada wisconsinensis Graenicher, 1911
- Nomada wootonella Cockerell, 1909
- Nomada wyomingensis Swenk, 1913
- Nomada xantha Mitai, Hirashima & Tadauchi, 2007
- Nomada xantholepis Cockerell, 1911
- Nomada xanthophila Cockerell, 1900
- Nomada xanthopoda Schwarz, 1990
- Nomada xanthopus Friese, 1921
- Nomada xanthura Cockerell, 1908
- Nomada yagensis Tsuneki, 1973
- Nomada yakushimensis Mitai, Ikudome & Tadauchi, 2007
- Nomada yanoi Tsuneki, 1973
- Nomada yarrowi Schwarz, 1981
- Nomada yasha Tsuneki, 1986
- Nomada zamoranica Cockerell, 1949
- Nomada zebrata Cresson, 1878
- Nomada ziziae Swenk, 1915
- Nomada zonalis Schwarz, 1990
- Nomada zonata Panzer, 1798
