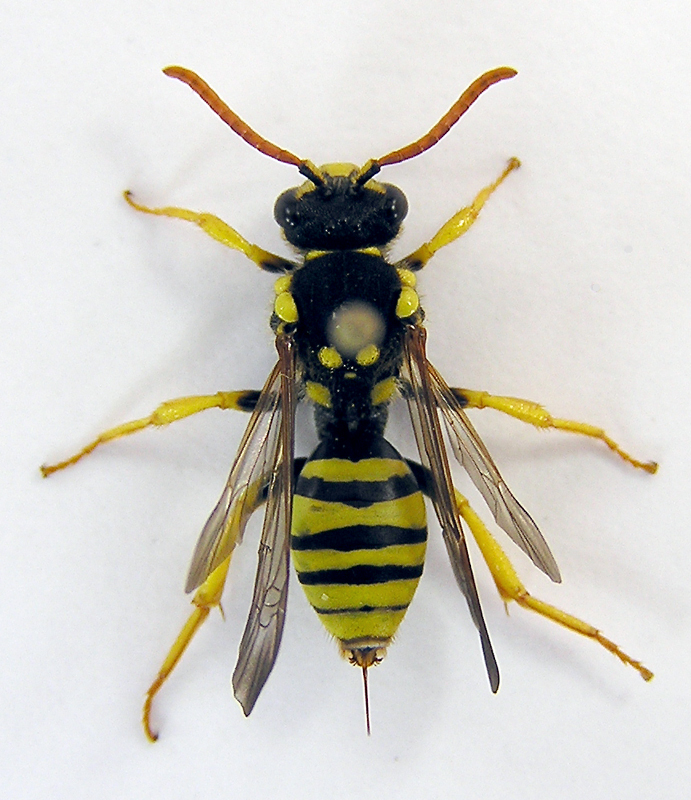

Scientific classification
- Kingdom: Animalia
- Phylum: Arthropoda
- Clade: Pancrustacea
- Class: Insecta
- Order: Hymenoptera
- Family: Apidae
- Genus: Nomada
- Species: N. succincta

Binomial name
- Nomada succincta Panzer, 1798

= Nomada succincta =

Species of bee

Nomada succincta is a species of bee in the family Apidae. It is known commonly as the yellow-legged nomad-bee.

This species is often confused with Nomada goodeniana and the two names may be listed as synonyms. Molecular analysis confirms that they are separate species.

== Gallery ==
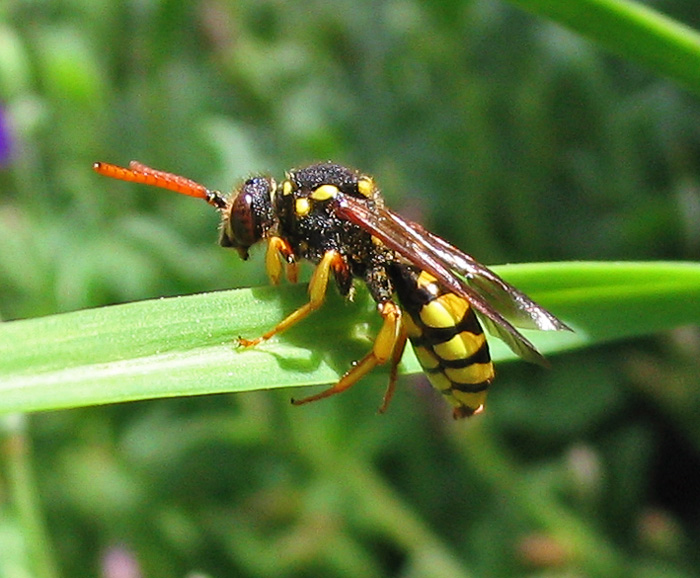

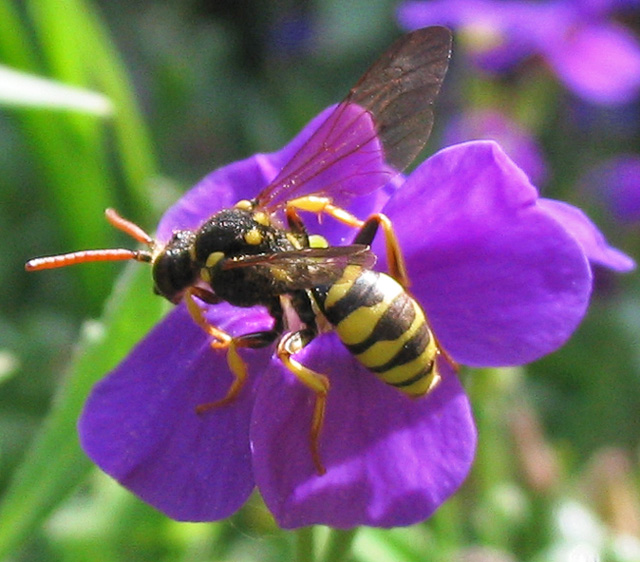

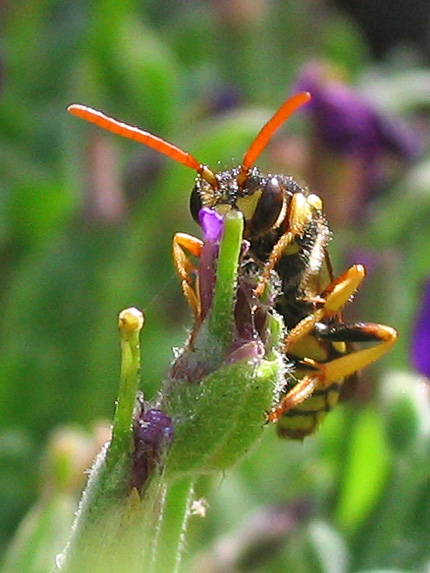

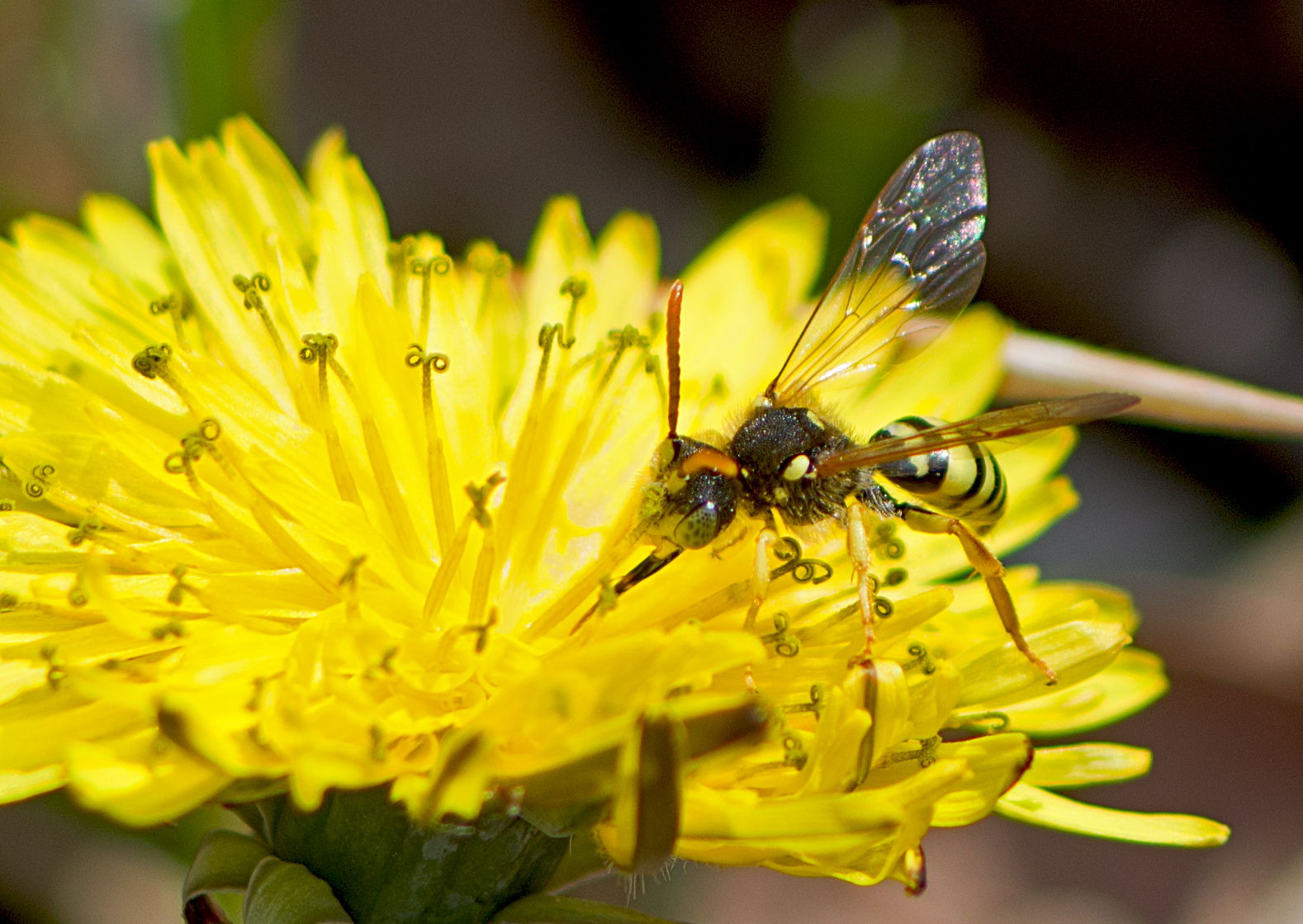
A yellow-legged nomad bee on a Dandelion
