= Nomada hemphilli =

Scientific classification
- Kingdom: Animalia
- Phylum: Arthropoda
- Clade: Pancrustacea
- Class: Insecta
- Order: Hymenoptera
- Family: Apidae
- Genus: Nomada
- Species: N. hemphilli

Binomial name
- Nomada hemphilli Cockerell, 1903

Species of bee

Nomada hemphilli is a species of nomad bee in the family Apidae. It is found in Central America and North America.
