= Nomada priscilla =

Scientific classification
- Kingdom: Animalia
- Phylum: Arthropoda
- Clade: Pancrustacea
- Class: Insecta
- Order: Hymenoptera
- Family: Apidae
- Genus: Nomada
- Species: N. priscilla

Binomial name
- Nomada priscilla Nurse, 1902

Species of bee

Nomada priscilla is a species of bee belonging to the family Apidae subfamily Nomadinae. It is found in Sri Lanka, India and Philippines.
