= Nomada utahensis =

Scientific classification
- Kingdom: Animalia
- Phylum: Arthropoda
- Clade: Pancrustacea
- Class: Insecta
- Order: Hymenoptera
- Family: Apidae
- Tribe: Nomadini
- Genus: Nomada
- Species: N. utahensis

Binomial name
- Nomada utahensis Moalif, 1988

Species of bee

Nomada utahensis is a species of nomad bee in the family Apidae. It is found in North America.
