= Nomada antennata =

Scientific classification
- Kingdom: Animalia
- Phylum: Arthropoda
- Clade: Pancrustacea
- Class: Insecta
- Order: Hymenoptera
- Family: Apidae
- Genus: Nomada
- Species: N. antennata

Binomial name
- Nomada antennata Meade-Waldo, 1913

Species of bee

Nomada antennata is a species of bee belonging to the family Apidae subfamily Nomadinae. It is endemic to Sri Lanka.
