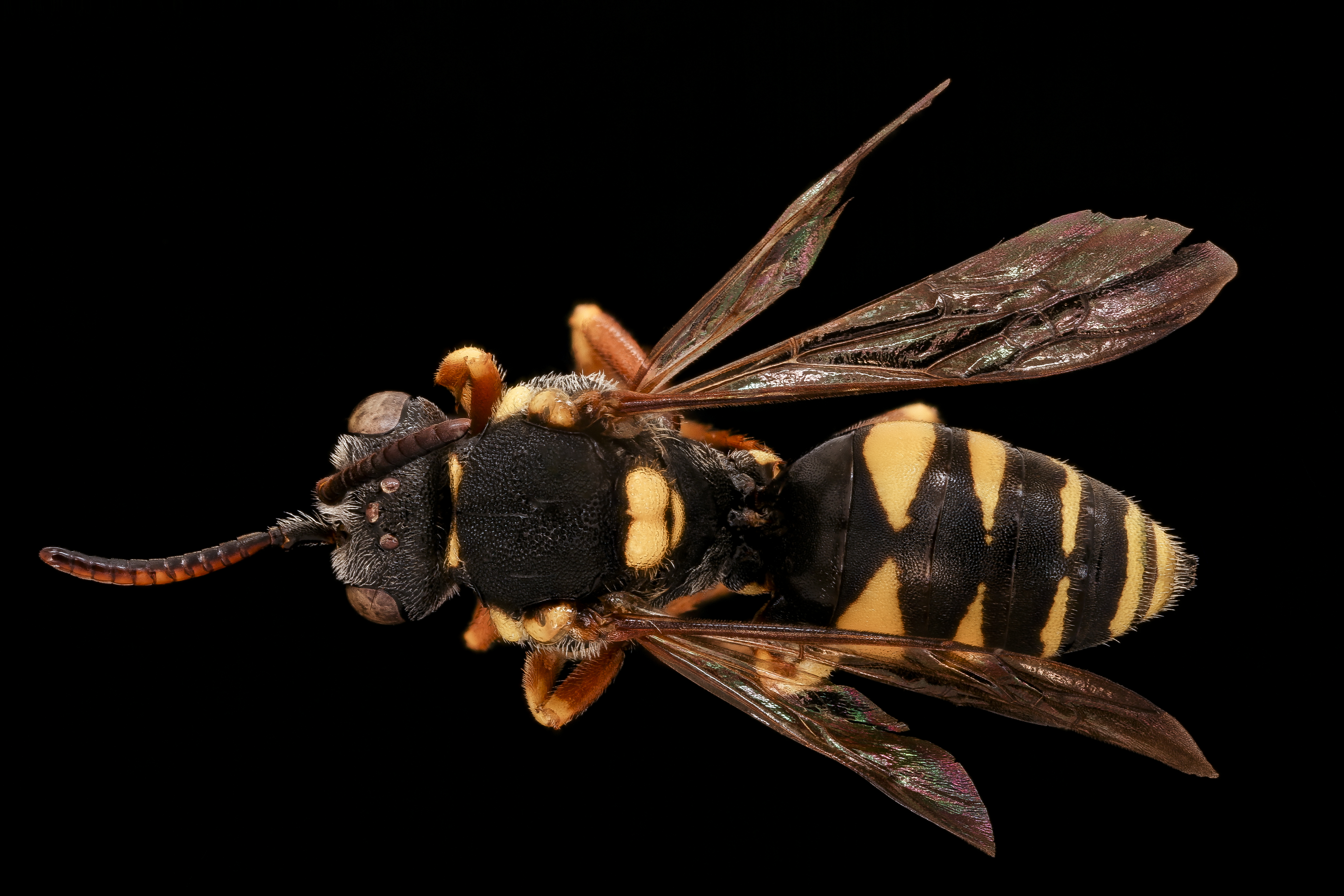

Scientific classification
- Kingdom: Animalia
- Phylum: Arthropoda
- Clade: Pancrustacea
- Class: Insecta
- Order: Hymenoptera
- Family: Apidae
- Genus: Nomada
- Species: N. placida

Binomial name
- Nomada placida Cresson, 1863

= Nomada placida =

Species of bee

Nomada placida is a species of nomad bee in the family Apidae. It is found in North America.
