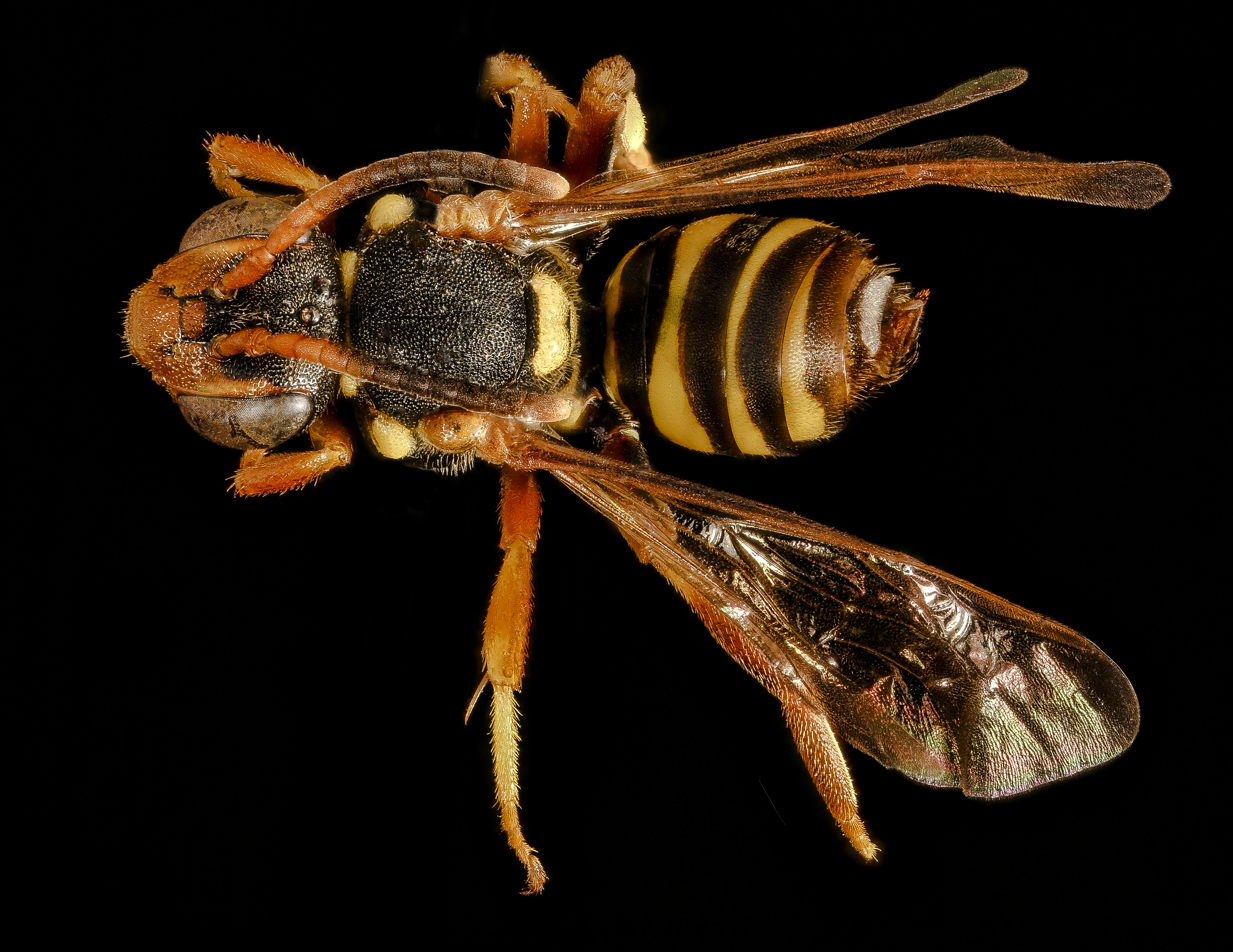

Scientific classification
- Kingdom: Animalia
- Phylum: Arthropoda
- Clade: Pancrustacea
- Class: Insecta
- Order: Hymenoptera
- Family: Apidae
- Genus: Nomada
- Species: N. vincta

Binomial name
- Nomada vincta Say, 1837

= Nomada vincta =

Species of bee

Nomada vincta is a species of nomad bee in the family Apidae. It is found in North America.
