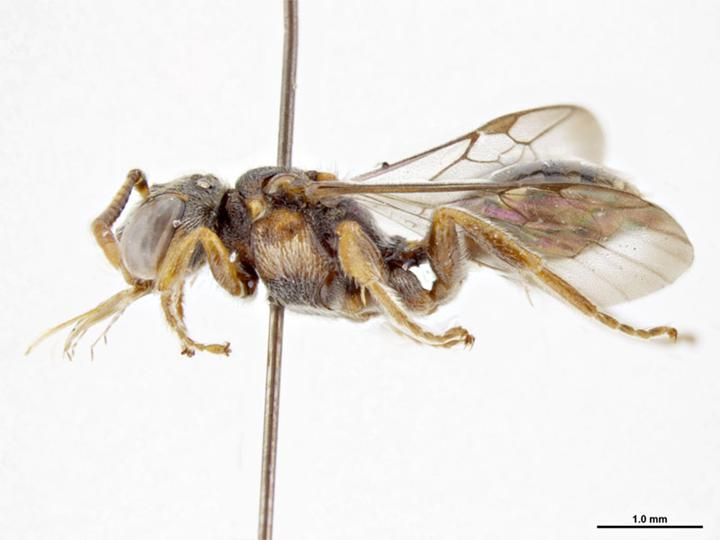
- Female

Scientific classification
- Kingdom: Animalia
- Phylum: Arthropoda
- Clade: Pancrustacea
- Class: Insecta
- Order: Hymenoptera
- Family: Apidae
- Genus: Nomada
- Species: N. australensis

Binomial name
- Nomada australensis Perkins, 1912

Synonyms
- Nomda rubinii Rayment, 1930

= Nomada australensis =

Species of bee

Nomada australensis, is a species of bee in the family Apidae and subfamily Nomadinae. It is endemic to Australia. It was described by British entomologist Robert Cyril Layton Perkins in 1912.

== Description ==
Female body length is about 6 mm. Integumental colouration is mainly black and brown.

== Distribution and habitat ==
The species occurs in north-eastern Australia. The type locality is Kuranda, Queensland.

== Behaviour ==
The adults are solitary flying mellivores. They are kleptoparasitic on other bees, possibly on Lasioglossum species, as brood parasites.

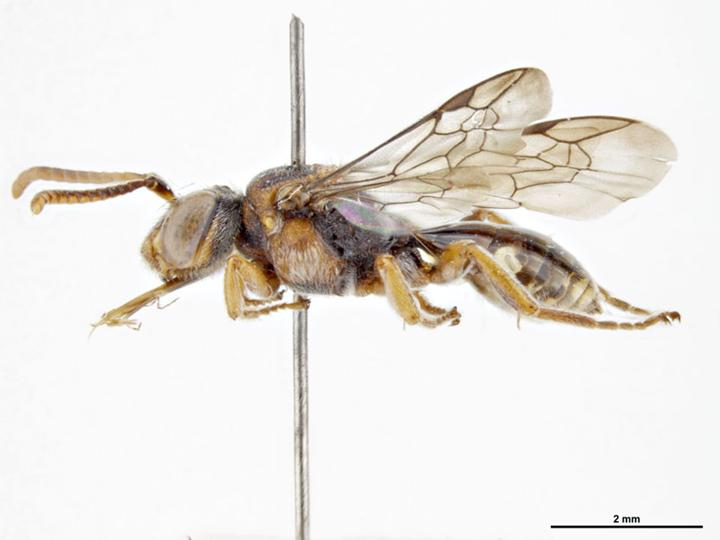
Male
