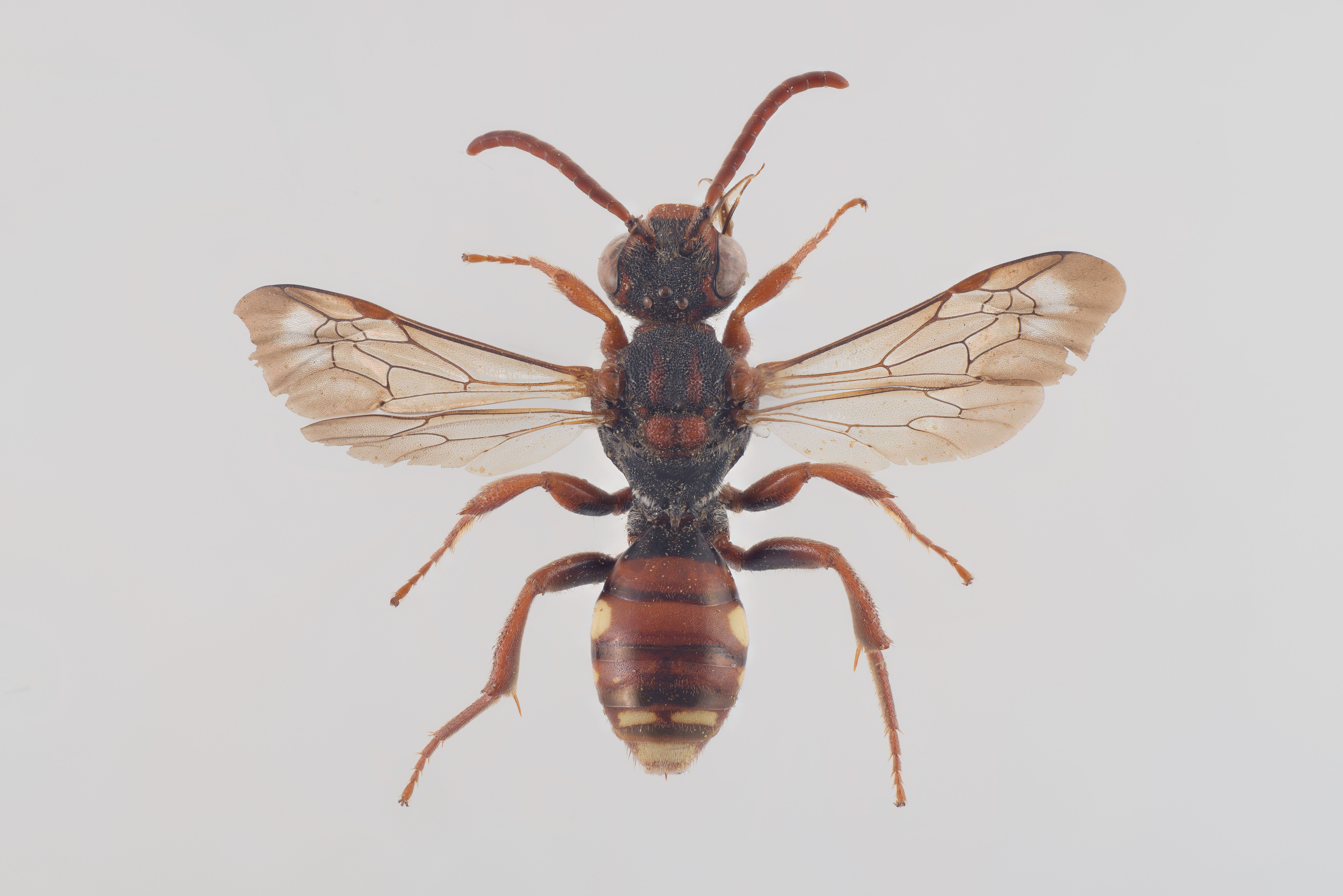

Scientific classification
- Kingdom: Animalia
- Phylum: Arthropoda
- Clade: Pancrustacea
- Class: Insecta
- Order: Hymenoptera
- Family: Apidae
- Subfamily: Nomadinae
- Tribe: Nomadini
- Genus: Nomada
- Species: N. striata

Binomial name
- Nomada striata (Fabricius, 1793)

= Nomada striata =

Species of bee

Nomada striata is a Palearctic species of nomad bee.
