= Nomada suavis =

Scientific classification
- Kingdom: Animalia
- Phylum: Arthropoda
- Clade: Pancrustacea
- Class: Insecta
- Order: Hymenoptera
- Family: Apidae
- Genus: Nomada
- Species: N. suavis

Binomial name
- Nomada suavis Cresson, 1878

Species of bee

Nomada suavis is a species of nomad bee in the family Apidae. It is found in North America.
