= Nomada abnormis =

Scientific classification
- Kingdom: Animalia
- Phylum: Arthropoda
- Clade: Pancrustacea
- Class: Insecta
- Order: Hymenoptera
- Family: Apidae
- Genus: Nomada
- Species: N. abnormis

Binomial name
- Nomada abnormis Ducke, 1912

Species of insect

Nomada abnormis is a bee in the Nomada genus. It can be found in South America.
