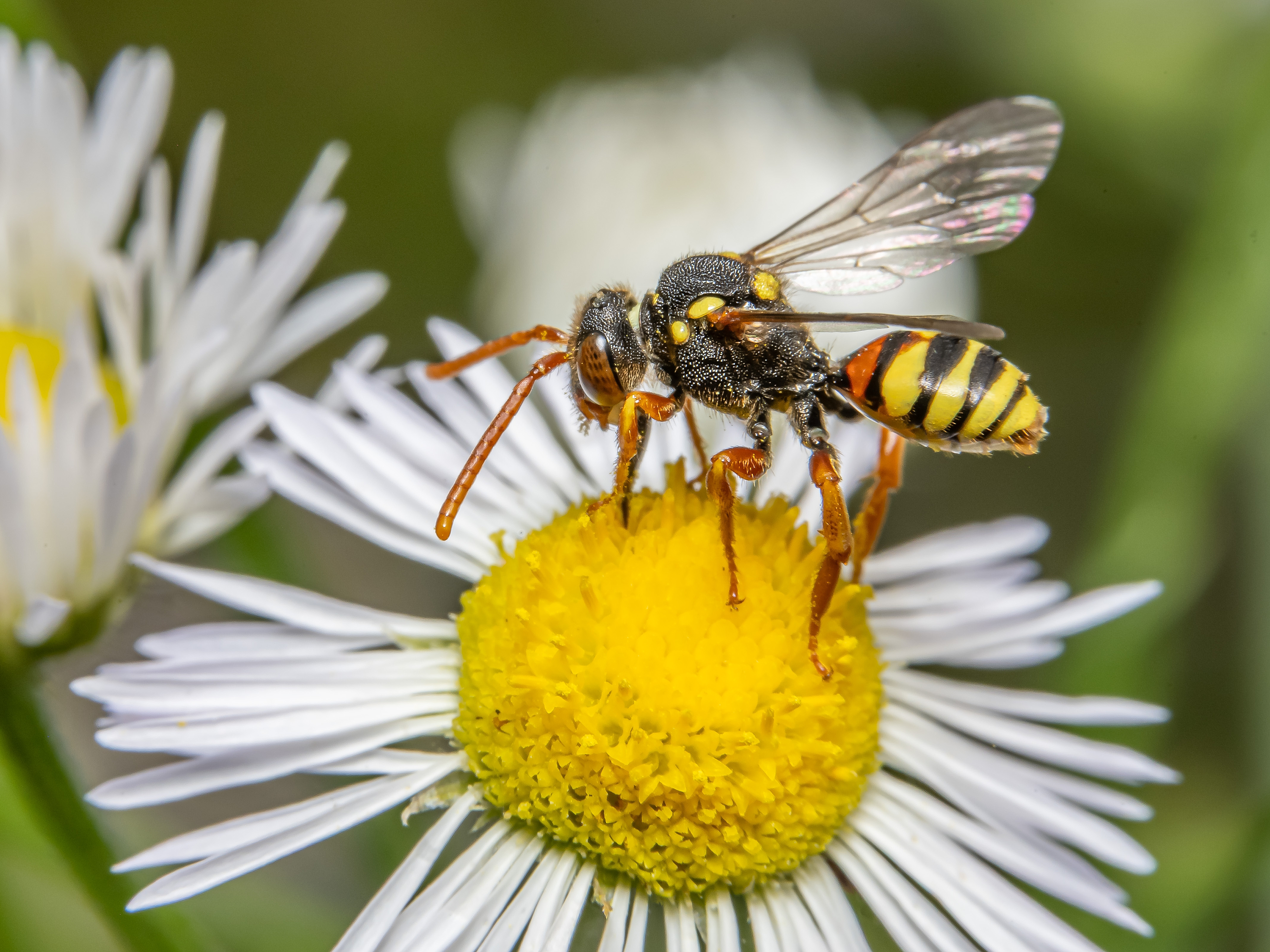

Scientific classification
- Kingdom: Animalia
- Phylum: Arthropoda
- Clade: Pancrustacea
- Class: Insecta
- Order: Hymenoptera
- Family: Apidae
- Genus: Nomada
- Species: N. fucata

Binomial name
- Nomada fucata Panzer, 1798

= Nomada fucata =

Species of bee

Nomada fucata, the painted nomad bee, is a species of bee in the family Apidae. The species is distributed over all of Europe and to parts of central Asia. The host of this species is Andrena flavipes.
