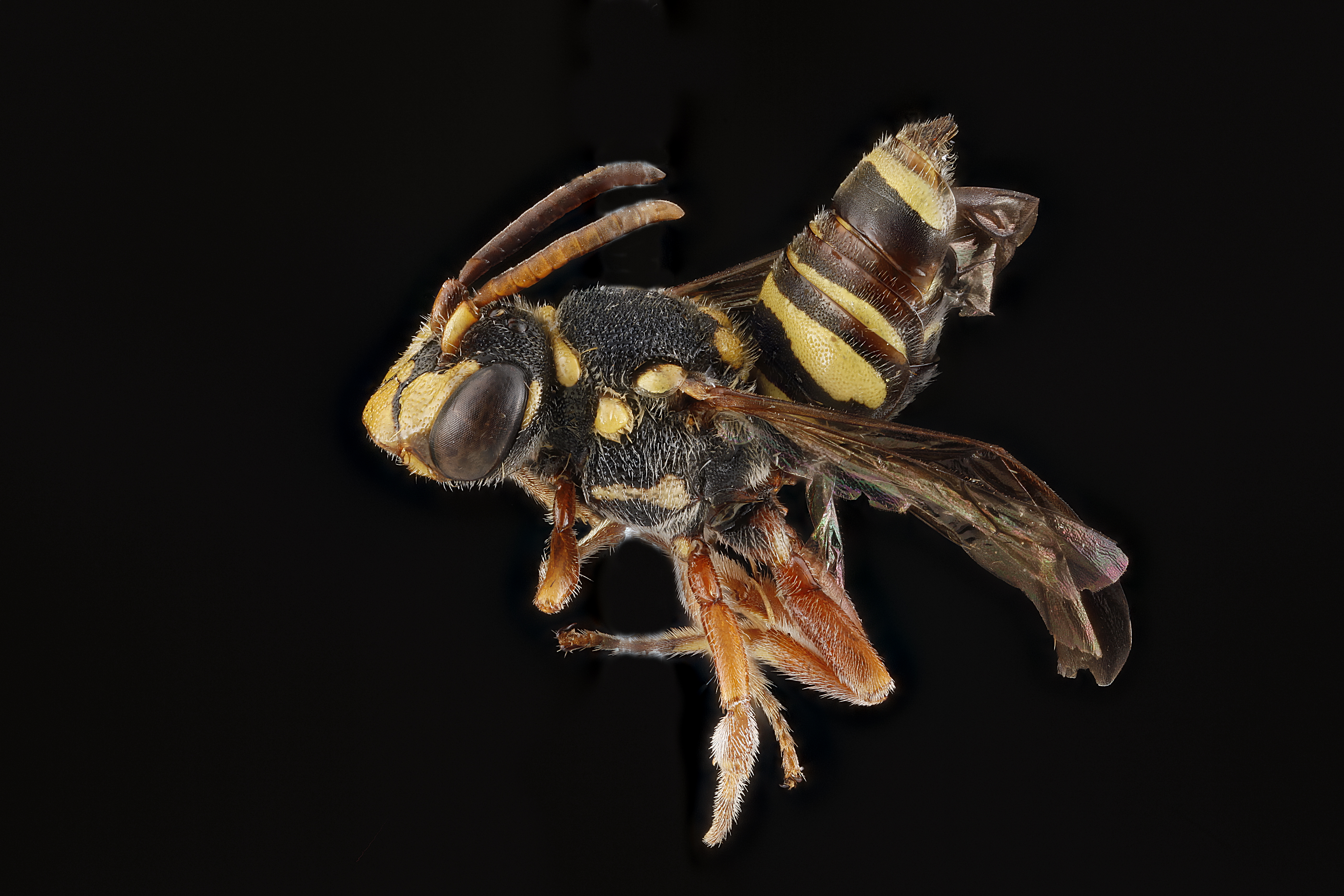

Scientific classification
- Domain: Eukaryota
- Kingdom: Animalia
- Phylum: Arthropoda
- Class: Insecta
- Order: Hymenoptera
- Family: Apidae
- Genus: Nomada
- Species: N. texana

Binomial name
- Nomada texana (Cresson, 1872)

Synonyms
- Nomada heiligbrodtii Cresson, 1878; Cephen texanus Cresson, 1872

= Nomada texana =

Species of bee

Nomada texana is a species of bee native to the southern and western United States and other parts of North America (including Mexico).

== Description ==
Nomada texana males measure from 7.5 to 8.0 mm, and females measure at around 8–9 mm. These bees are primarily black with yellow markings and reddish legs.
