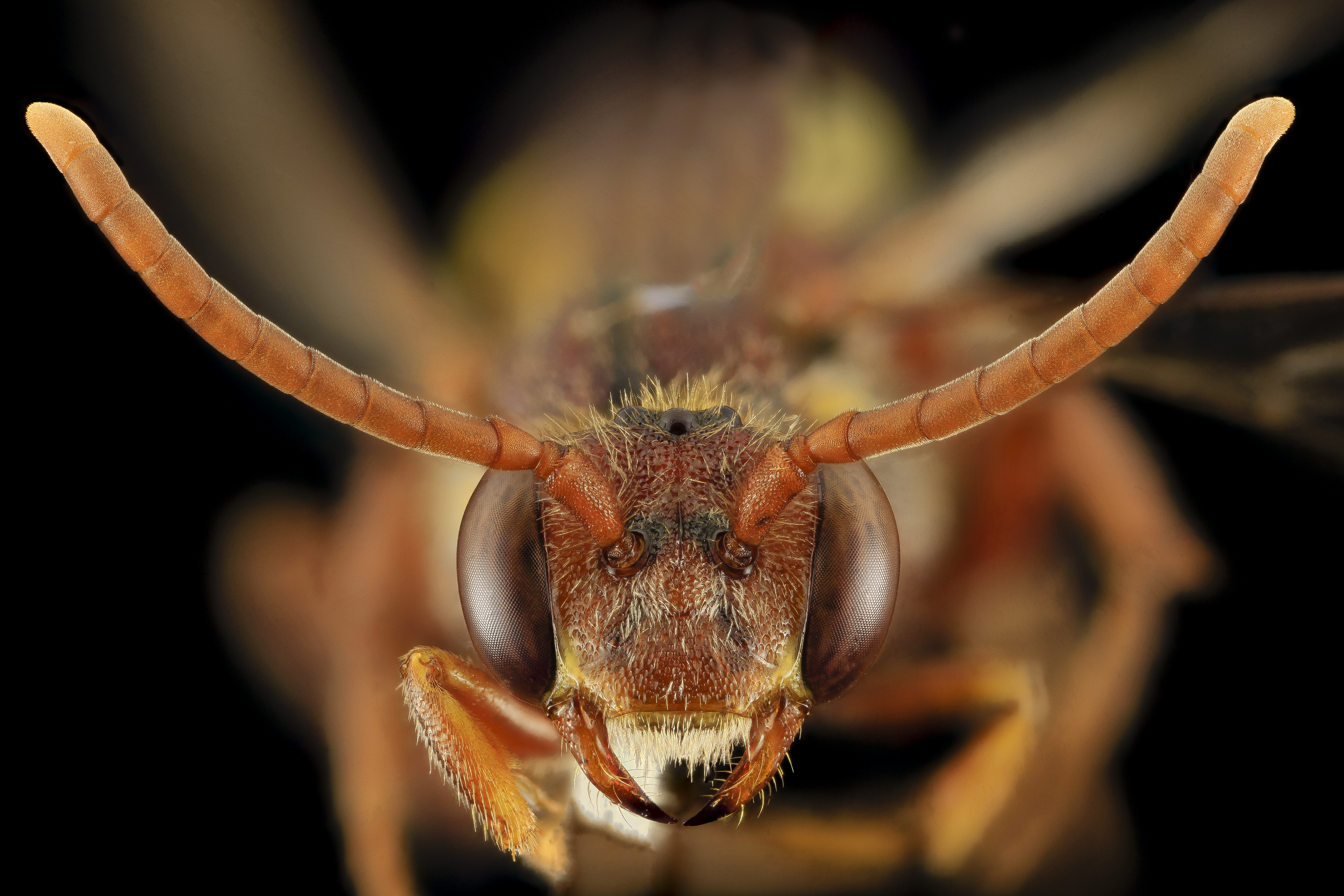

Scientific classification
- Kingdom: Animalia
- Phylum: Arthropoda
- Clade: Pancrustacea
- Class: Insecta
- Order: Hymenoptera
- Family: Apidae
- Tribe: Nomadini
- Genus: Nomada
- Species: N. bethunei

Binomial name
- Nomada bethunei Grote & Robinson, 1868

= Nomada bethunei =

Species of bee

Nomada bethunei is a species of nomad bee in the family Apidae. It is found in North America.
