= Nomada edwardsii =

Scientific classification
- Kingdom: Animalia
- Phylum: Arthropoda
- Clade: Pancrustacea
- Class: Insecta
- Order: Hymenoptera
- Family: Apidae
- Genus: Nomada
- Species: N. edwardsii

Binomial name
- Nomada edwardsii Cresson, 1878

Species of bee

Nomada edwardsii is a species of nomad bee in the family Apidae. It is found in Central America and North America.

== Subspecies ==
These two subspecies belong to the species Nomada edwardsii:

- Nomada edwardsii edwardsii Cresson, 1878
- Nomada edwardsii vinnula Cresson, 1879
