= Nomada verecunda =

Scientific classification
- Kingdom: Animalia
- Phylum: Arthropoda
- Clade: Pancrustacea
- Class: Insecta
- Order: Hymenoptera
- Family: Apidae
- Genus: Nomada
- Species: N. verecunda

Binomial name
- Nomada verecunda Cresson, 1879

Species of bee

Nomada verecunda is a species in the family Apidae ("cuckoo, carpenter, digger, bumble, and honey bees"), in the order Hymenoptera ("ants, bees, wasps and sawflies"). Nomada verecunda is found in North America.
