= Nomada abtana =

Scientific classification
- Kingdom: Animalia
- Phylum: Arthropoda
- Clade: Pancrustacea
- Class: Insecta
- Order: Hymenoptera
- Family: Apidae
- Genus: Nomada
- Species: N. abtana

Binomial name
- Nomada abtana Tsuneki, 1973

Species of Bee

Nomada abtana is a species of bee in the Nomada genus. It is most active in the summer and can be found in Japan.
