= Nomada wickwari =

Scientific classification
- Kingdom: Animalia
- Phylum: Arthropoda
- Clade: Pancrustacea
- Class: Insecta
- Order: Hymenoptera
- Family: Apidae
- Genus: Nomada
- Species: N. wickwari

Binomial name
- Nomada wickwari Meade-Waldo, 1913

Species of bee

Nomada wickwari is a species of bee belonging to the family Apidae subfamily Nomadinae. It is endemic to Sri Lanka.
