= Nomada crotchii =

Scientific classification
- Kingdom: Animalia
- Phylum: Arthropoda
- Clade: Pancrustacea
- Class: Insecta
- Order: Hymenoptera
- Family: Apidae
- Genus: Nomada
- Species: N. crotchii

Binomial name
- Nomada crotchii Cresson, 1878

Species of bee

Nomada crotchii is a species of nomad bee in the family Apidae. It is found in North America.

== Subspecies ==
These two subspecies belong to the species Nomada crotchii:

- Nomada crotchii crotchii Cresson, 1878
- Nomada crotchii nigrior Cockerell, 1903
