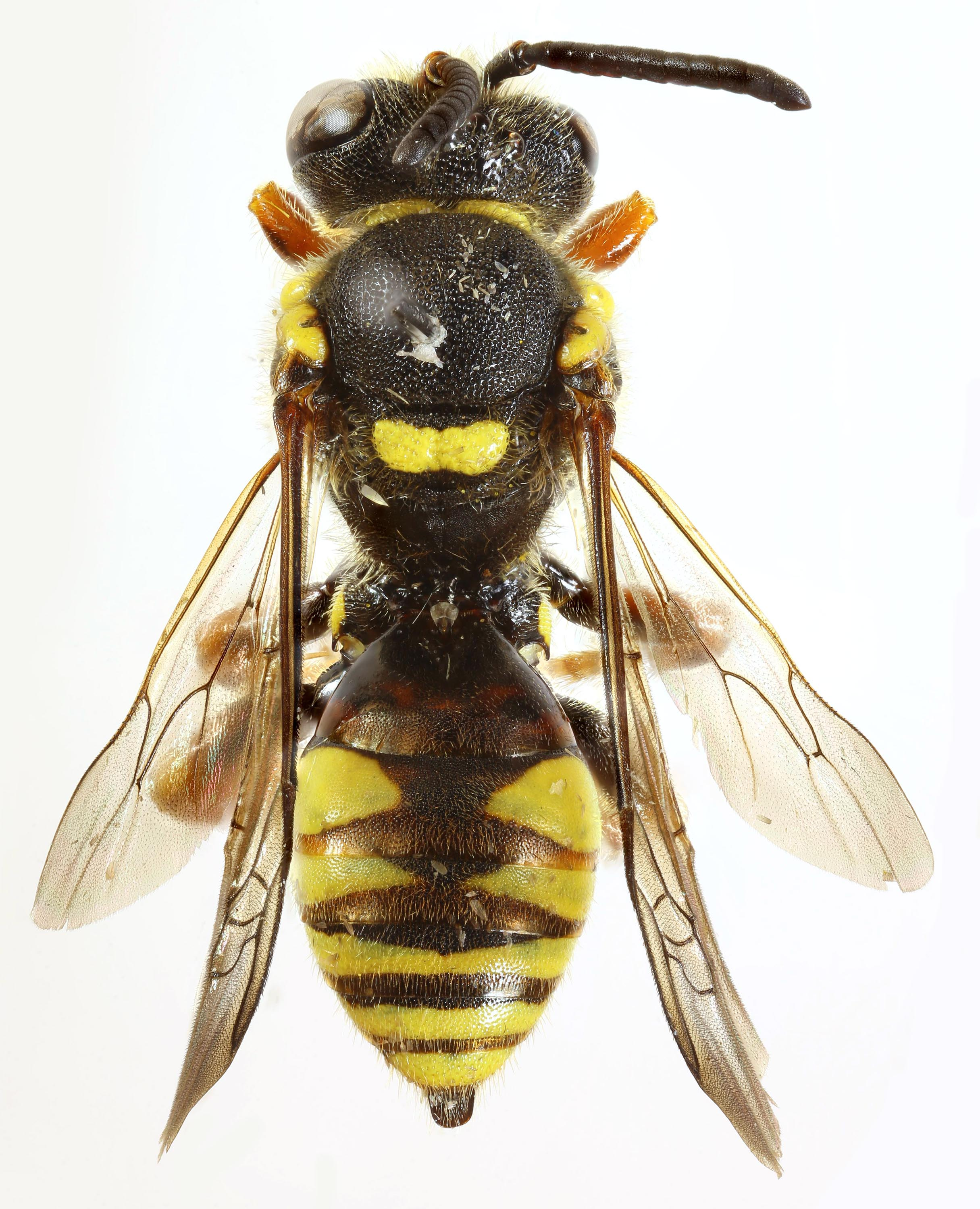
- Nomada rufipes male Bagillt, North Wales

Scientific classification
- Kingdom: Animalia
- Phylum: Arthropoda
- Clade: Pancrustacea
- Class: Insecta
- Order: Hymenoptera
- Family: Apidae
- Subfamily: Nomadinae
- Tribe: Nomadini
- Genus: Nomada
- Species: N. rufipes

Binomial name
- Nomada rufipes (Fabricius, 1793)

= Nomada rufipes =

Species of bee

Nomada rufipes is a Palearctic species of nomad bee.
