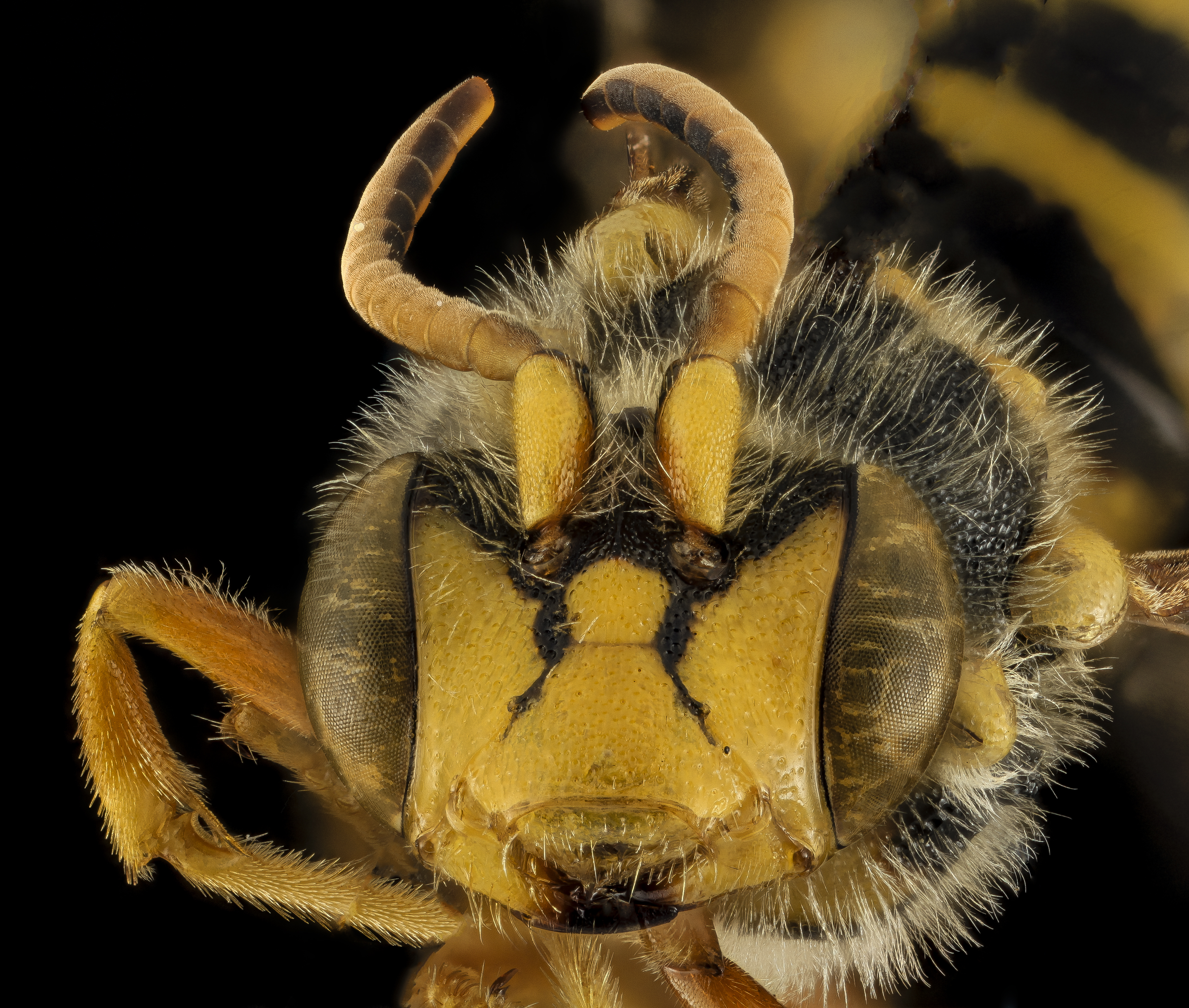

Scientific classification
- Kingdom: Animalia
- Phylum: Arthropoda
- Clade: Pancrustacea
- Class: Insecta
- Order: Hymenoptera
- Family: Apidae
- Genus: Nomada
- Species: N. affabilis

Binomial name
- Nomada affabilis Cresson, 1878

= Nomada affabilis =

Species of bee

Nomada affabilis is a species of nomad bee in the family Apidae. It is found in North America.

== Subspecies ==
These two subspecies belong to the species Nomada affabilis:

- Nomada affabilis affabilis Cresson, 1878
- Nomada affabilis dallasensis Cockerell, 1911
