= Nomada ceylonica =

Scientific classification
- Kingdom: Animalia
- Phylum: Arthropoda
- Clade: Pancrustacea
- Class: Insecta
- Order: Hymenoptera
- Family: Apidae
- Genus: Nomada
- Species: N. ceylonica

Binomial name
- Nomada ceylonica Cameron, 1897

Species of bee

Nomada ceylonica is a species of bee belonging to the family Apidae subfamily Nomadinae. It is found from Sri Lanka and south India.
