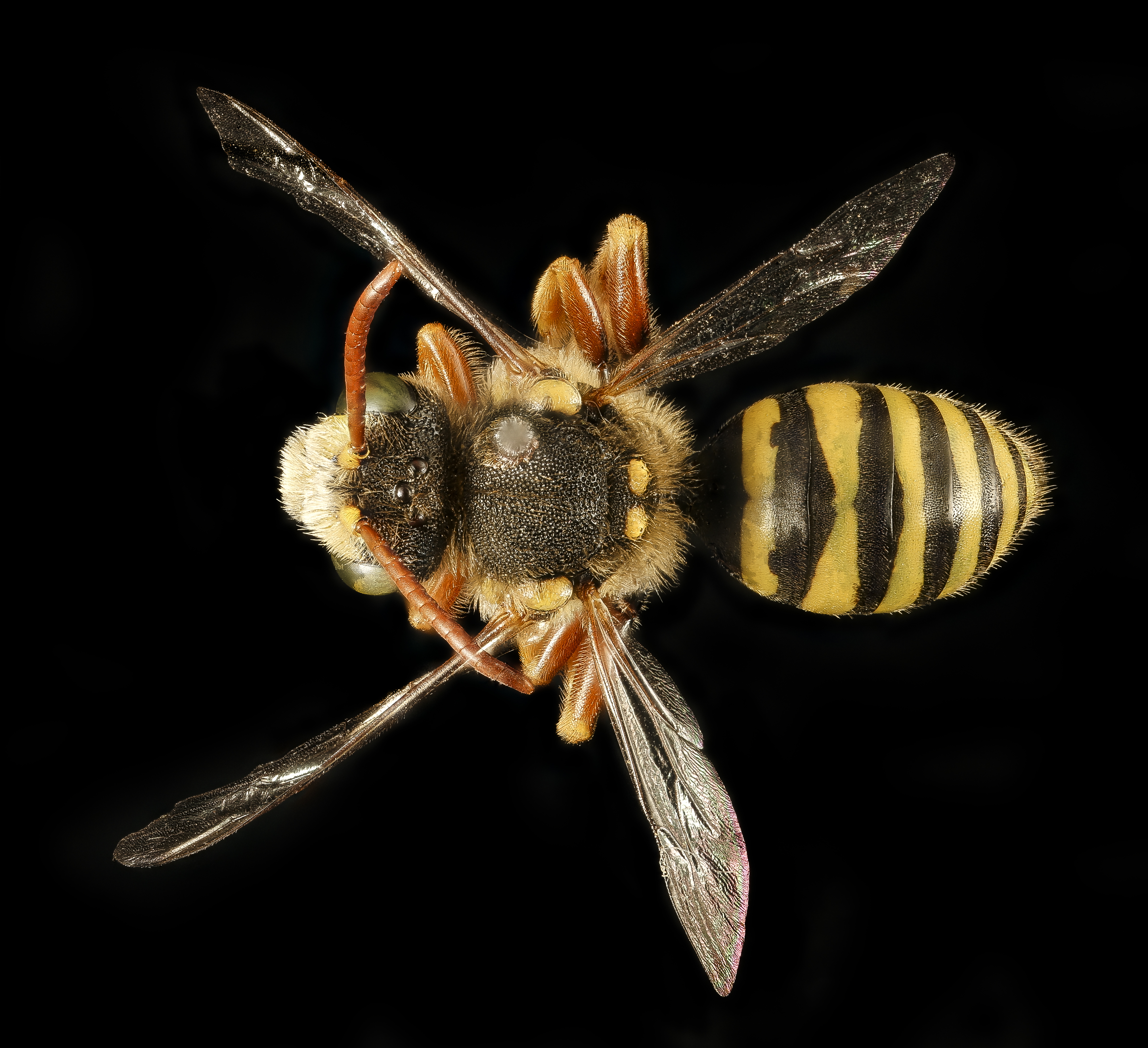

Scientific classification
- Kingdom: Animalia
- Phylum: Arthropoda
- Clade: Pancrustacea
- Class: Insecta
- Order: Hymenoptera
- Family: Apidae
- Genus: Nomada
- Species: N. superba

Binomial name
- Nomada superba Cresson, 1863

= Nomada superba =

Species of bee

Nomada superba is a species of nomad bee in the family Apidae. It is found in North America.

== Subspecies ==
These two subspecies belong to the species Nomada superba:

- Nomada superba malvastri Swenk, 1913
- Nomada superba superba Cresson, 1863
