= Nomada adusta =

Scientific classification
- Kingdom: Animalia
- Phylum: Arthropoda
- Clade: Pancrustacea
- Class: Insecta
- Order: Hymenoptera
- Family: Apidae
- Genus: Nomada
- Species: N. adusta

Binomial name
- Nomada adusta Smith, 1875

Species of bee

Nomada adusta is a species of bee belonging to the family Apidae. It is found in India, Malaysia, Myanmar, Nepal, Sri Lanka, and Thailand.
