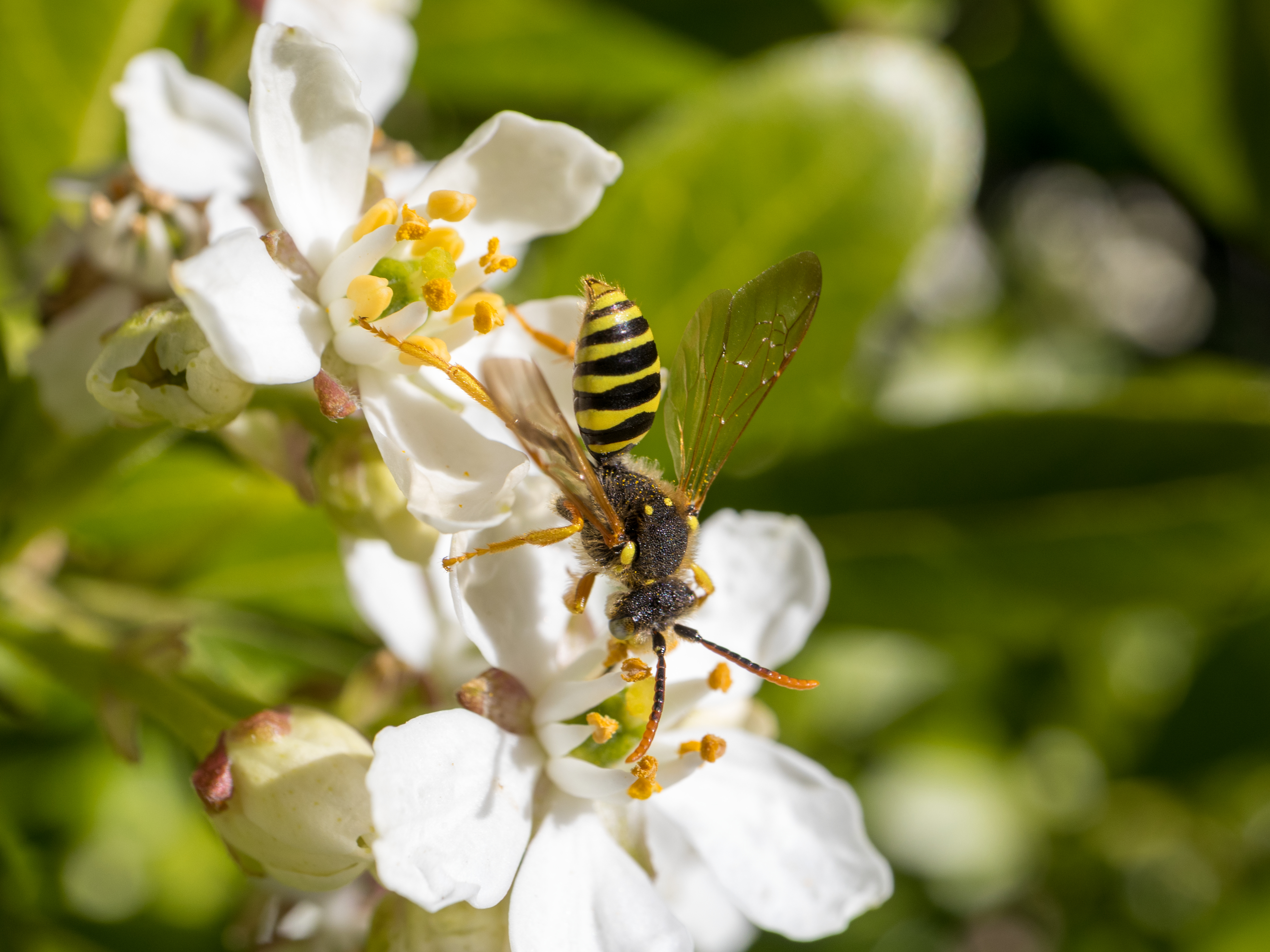
- Nomada goodeniana

Scientific classification
- Kingdom: Animalia
- Phylum: Arthropoda
- Clade: Pancrustacea
- Class: Insecta
- Order: Hymenoptera
- Family: Apidae
- Subfamily: Nomadinae
- Tribe: Nomadini
- Genus: Nomada
- Species: N. goodeniana

Binomial name
- Nomada goodeniana (Kirby, 1802)

= Nomada goodeniana =

Species of bee

Nomada goodeniana is a Palearctic species of nomad bee. This bees lays its eggs in Andrena nitida nests.
