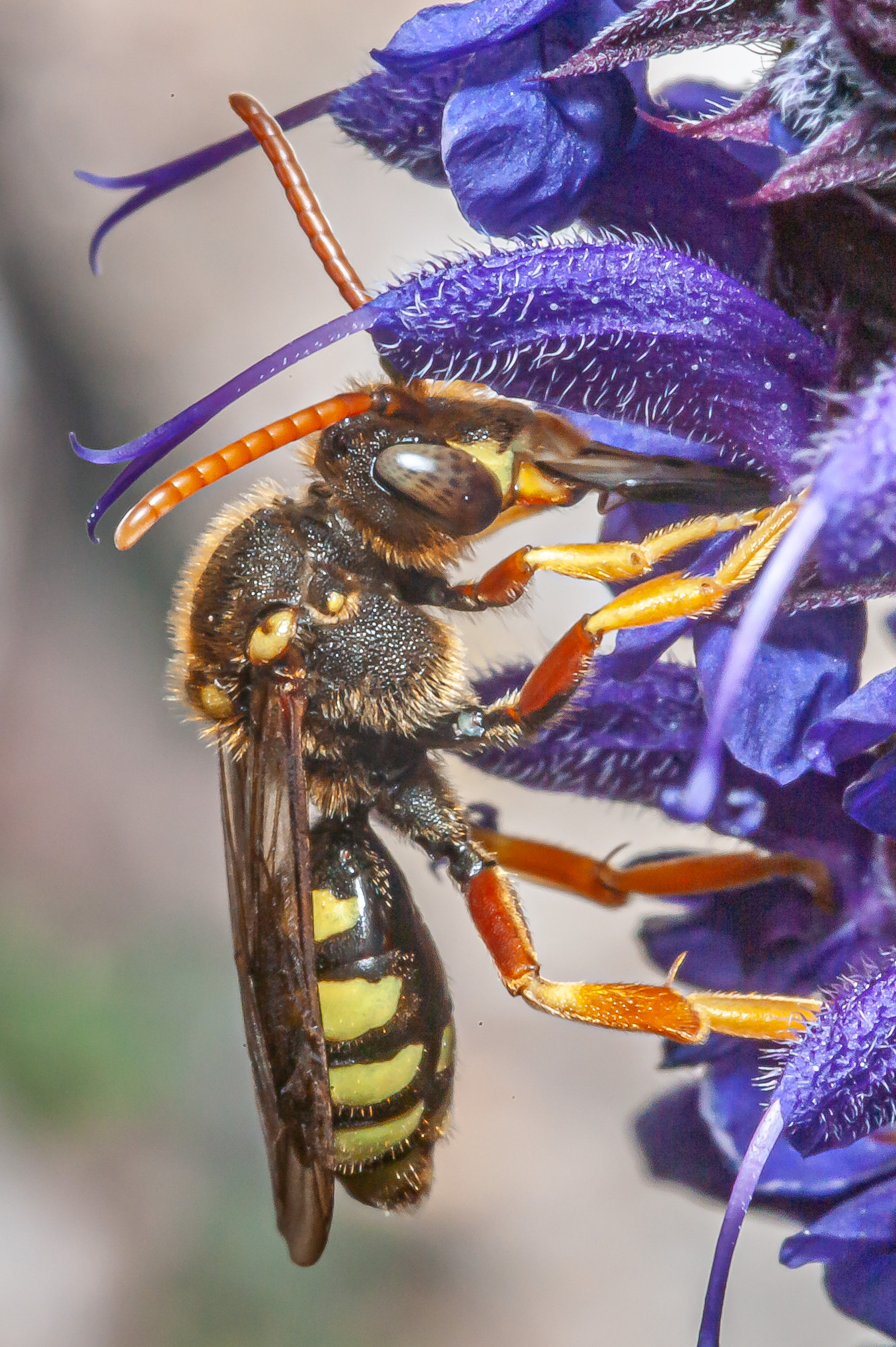
- Nomada sexfasciata

Scientific classification
- Kingdom: Animalia
- Phylum: Arthropoda
- Clade: Pancrustacea
- Class: Insecta
- Order: Hymenoptera
- Family: Apidae
- Subfamily: Nomadinae
- Tribe: Nomadini; Latreille, 1802
- Genus: Nomada; Scopoli, 1770

Species
- >850 species

= Nomada =

Genus of bees

With over 850 species, the genus Nomada is one of the largest genera in the family Apidae, and the largest genus of cuckoo bees. Cuckoo bees are so named because they enter the nests of a host and lay eggs there, stealing resources that the host has already collected. The name "Nomada" is derived from the Greek word nomas (νομάς), meaning "roaming" or "wandering."

Nomada are kleptoparasites of many different types of bees as hosts, primarily the genus Andrena, but also Agapostemon, Melitta, Eucera and Exomalopsis. As parasites, they lack a pollen-carrying scopa, and are mostly hairless, as they do not collect pollen to feed their offspring. Like non-parasitic bees, adults are known to visit flowers and feed on nectar. Given the lack of scopa and general behavior, they are considered poor pollinators.

== Appearance and identification ==
They are often extraordinarily wasp-like in appearance, with red, black, and yellow colors prevailing, and with smoky (infuscated) wings or wing tips. They vary greatly in appearance between species, and can be stripeless, or have yellow or white integumental markings on their abdomen. There are specialized patches of hair on the tip of the abdomen of female Nomada. Males have an obvious, often notched pygidial plate. In general, females are easily identifiable by the lack of scopa, reduced body hair, thick exoskeleton, and mandibles.

Separation of this genus from other Nomadinae can be difficult; details of the wing venation, and the nature of the patch of silvery setae at the tip of the female metasoma are the best distinguishing features.

Species of Nomada exhibit an unusual behavior where adult bees are observed to be sleeping by using only their mandibles to hold onto plants.

== Distribution ==
Nomada occur worldwide. All known species parasitize ground-nesting bees, and their habitats and seasonality correlate with their hosts. Ground nesting bees nest in soil, either in open habitats or in ones covered with vegetation, with a good floral source nearby.

== Parasitism ==
Bees of the genus Nomada most often parasitize bees of the genus Andrena, but have also been observed parasitizing other ground-nesting bees in the families Andrenidae, Melittidae, Halictidae, and Apidae. As is the case for other nomadines, this behavior violates "Emery's rule" which states that social parasites tend to be either closely related to or sister species of their host.

Nomada are guided by visual cues to locate host nest entrances. In early spring, they can be spotted flying low to the ground, searching for nests to parasitize. Once a nest is found, studies show that Nomada females assess their hosts nests based on three guiding principles: 1) vulnerability and quality of the host cell, 2) threat of a maternal host's presence, 3) competition with other Nomada bees. These three factors are assessed by the bees' olfactory senses to determine if the nest is provisioned with pollen, if a host bee is nearby or in the nest, if the nest has been parasitized before, and if there are other parasitic bees nearby.

The role of male and female cuckoos bees in the parasitism process differs. Before mating, male Nomada will fly locally, secreting a scent which mimics the host female. Male cuckoo bees will secrete this scent near host nests to help female Nomada find a nest to deposit eggs. Furthermore, when male and female bees mate, there is evidence that part of the male's secreted scent rubs off onto female bees, which will actually provide an advantage to her finding and entering a host nest.

Nomada parasitizes their host cells by laying eggs in host nests while the female host bee is foraging for pollen, or nectar. The female Nomada oviposits in the host's cells before host oviposition and nest cell closure. The female cuckoo bee will lay her eggs in the host's nest and leave. Some species are known to bury the egg at right angles into the cell wall, while some only partially insert the egg. Additionally, Nomada may sometimes leave multiple eggs into one host cell, a frequent trait of kleptoparasitic bees. Using their mandibles, the parasite larvae kill the host offspring and any conspecific larvae until only one is alive. This larva then consumes the host's provisions. This type of parasitism is also known as brood parasitism, where the parasite's offspring develop on the nutrients gathered by the host for its own offspring.

== Mating behavior ==
Observations of Nomada mating are relatively rare, however there are reports of mating behavior as described below.

In five species of Nomada, the main component of male odor secretions was identical to the Dufour's gland secretions of the female host species. The female Nomada interact with the male's secretion during the matting process. There is evidence these secretions help the female Nomada bees recognize the host nests. Furthermore, reports of non-lethal and non-threatening interactions between Nomada and the host Andrena suggest this chemical odor may provide camouflage to protect her from the host females because physically, these genera do not resemblance each other.

There is evidence of "antennal grabbing" during copulation, in which the male Nomada strokes the female antenna. This process transfers pheromones from the male to the female and may make the female unattractive to other males, as well as provide chemical cues to the location of a host nest. The pheromone transfer may also disguise the scent of the female Nomada, allowing her to enter the host nest undetected. The pheromones are transferred when the males hold the female bees down with their feet, while they use their antennae to grab the females' antennae.

Other reports of Nomada mating includes males "swarming" willow and gooseberry plants.

== Life cycle ==
Nomada bees are holometabolous and they follow the general process of: (1) egg (2) larvae (3) pupa (4) adult. In one egg cell, the female Nomada will deposit 1–2 eggs. These eggs hatch and the larvae use their mandibles to kill other eggs and larvae. These larvae feed on the stored provisions. The offspring pupate in the host cell and finally emerge as adults the following season along with the hosts.

== Species ==
Species of the genus Nomada are highly variable in behavior and habitat specialization. Occurring worldwide, their active periods vary based on their hosts.

There is evidence that most species of Nomada are species-specific to their hosts, and that males mimic the specific scents of the species they parasitize. However, not much research has been done to understand the specialization of Nomada, and it is known that some species are more generalist than others.

See list of Nomada species for a complete list.

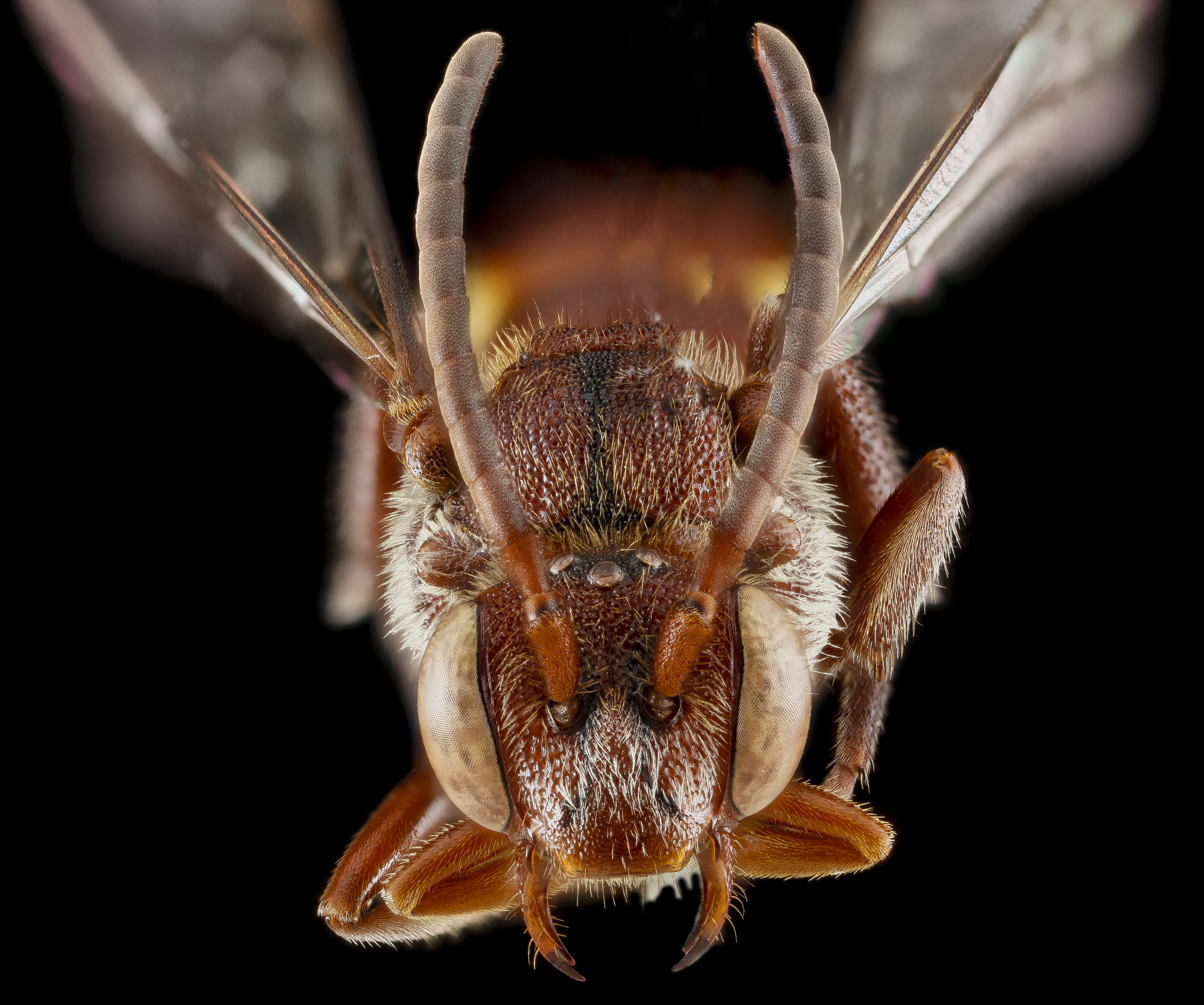
Nomada maculata, female

== Links ==
- Image Gallery
- Nomada at BugGuide
