= Grove Colliery =

Coal mine in Staffordshire, England

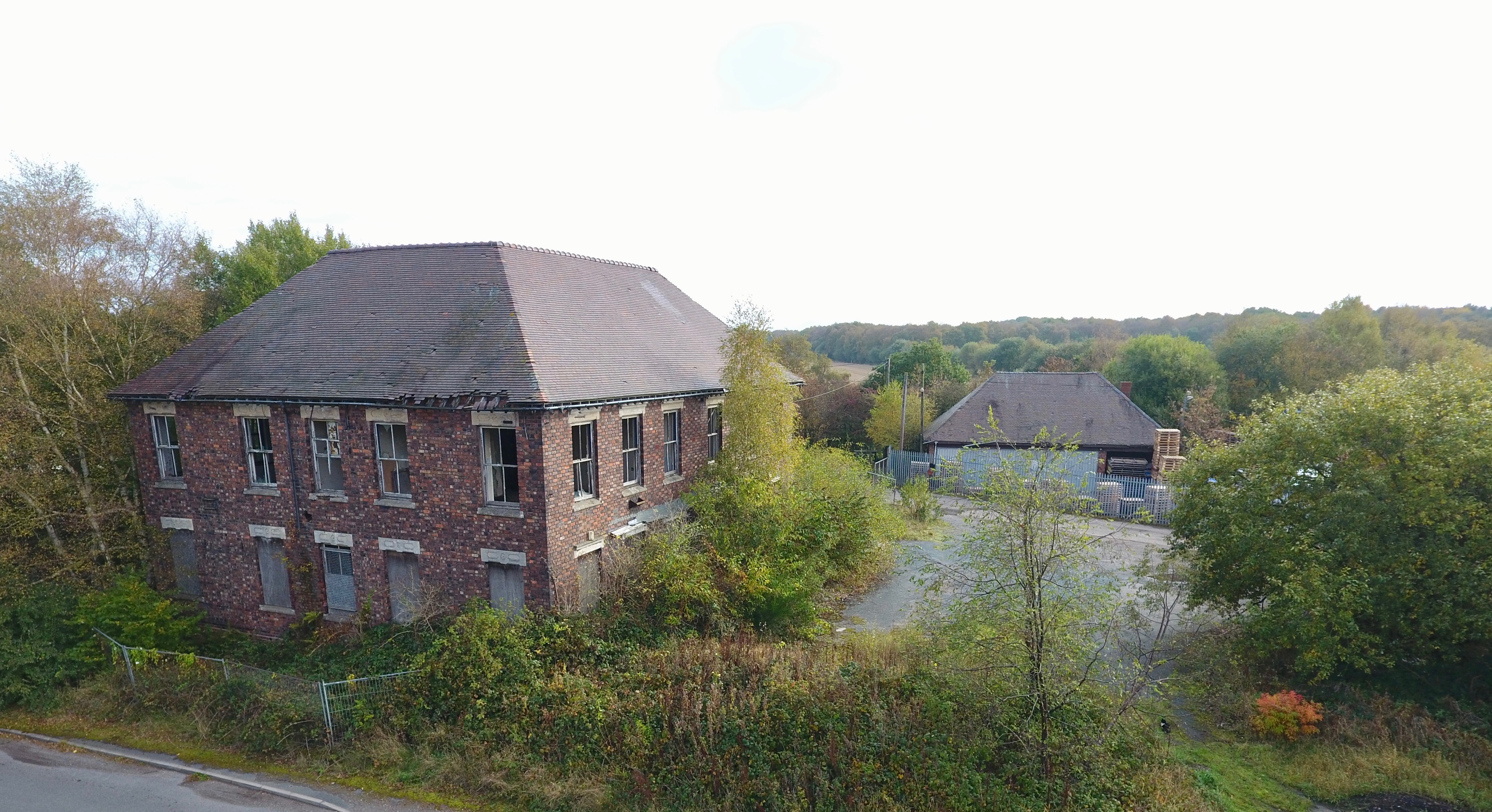

Grove Colliery was a colliery in North Lanes, Staffordshire. Located between the villages of Pelsall and Norton Canes. It opened in 1852 as Wyrley Grove Colliery. It was served by barges on the Cannock Extension Canal until the arrival of a mineral line from Norton Junction. In 1930, a mining explosion occurred which killed 14 miners.

The colliery was closed in 1952 and all traces were swept away by the mid 70's. Today, an industrial estate stands on the site of the former trackbed and the canal is popular with residential barges.
