= Pelsall =

Village in West Midlands, England

Coordinates: 52.631°N 1.972°W

- Village
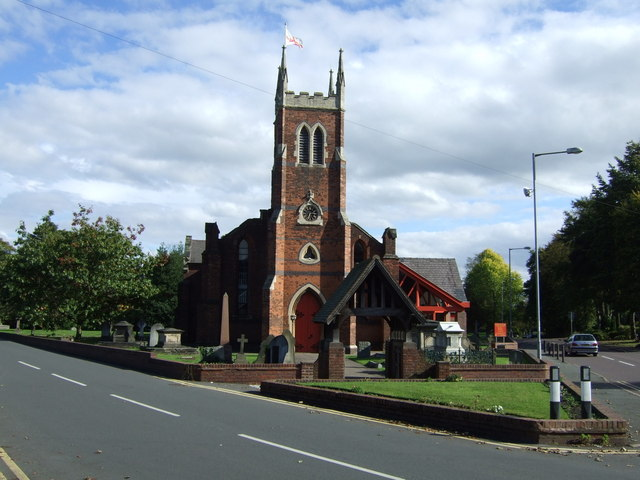
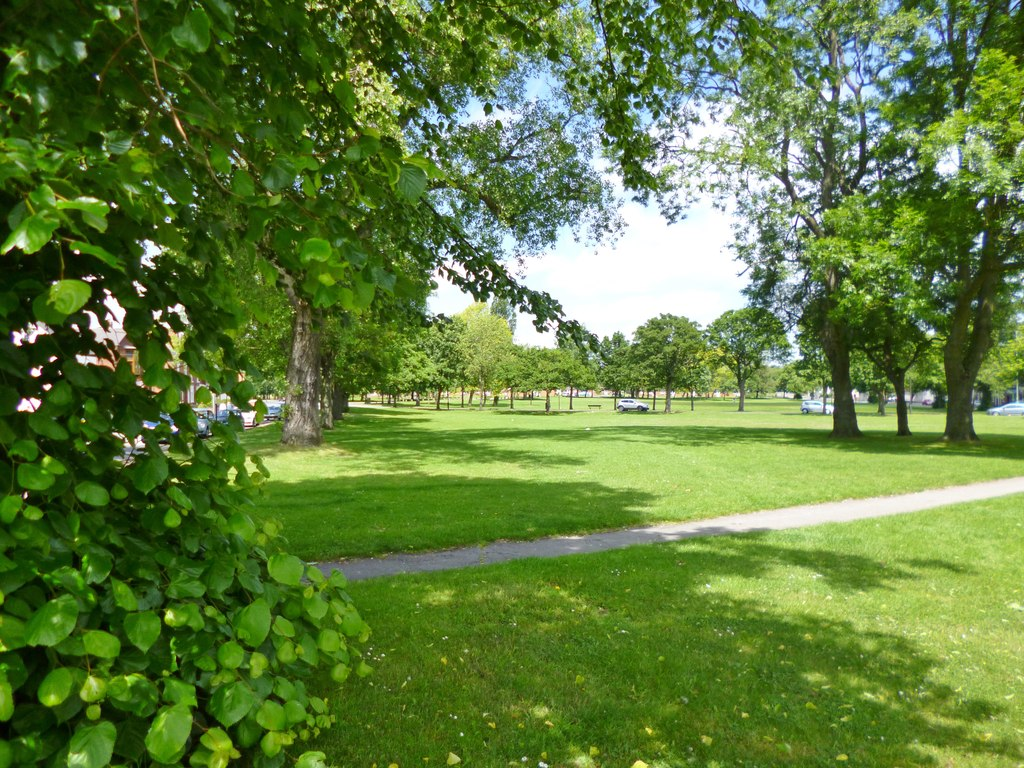
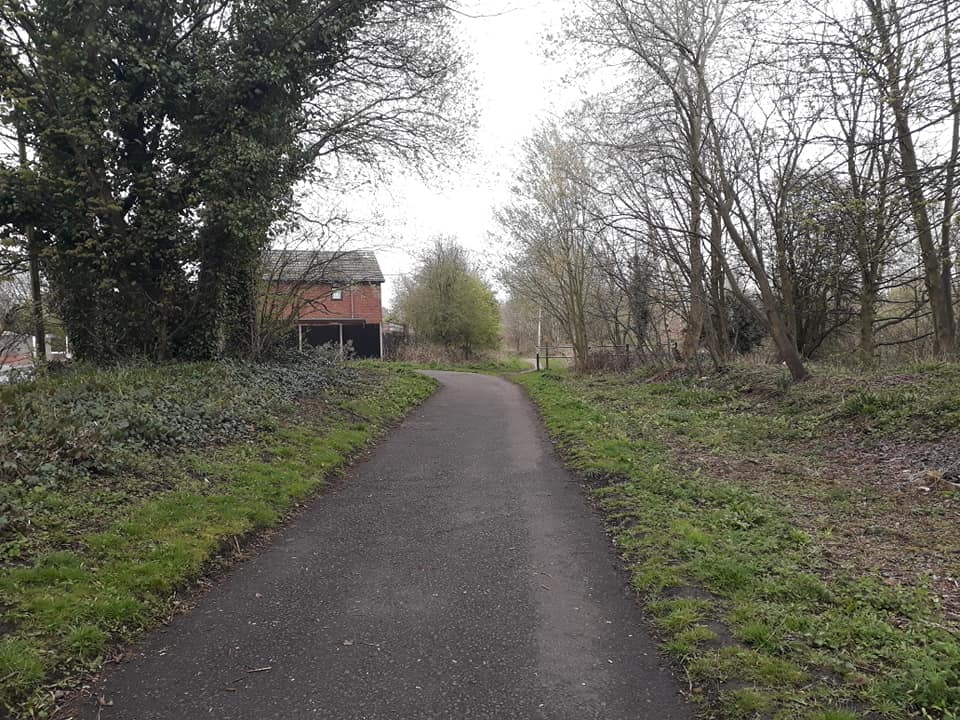
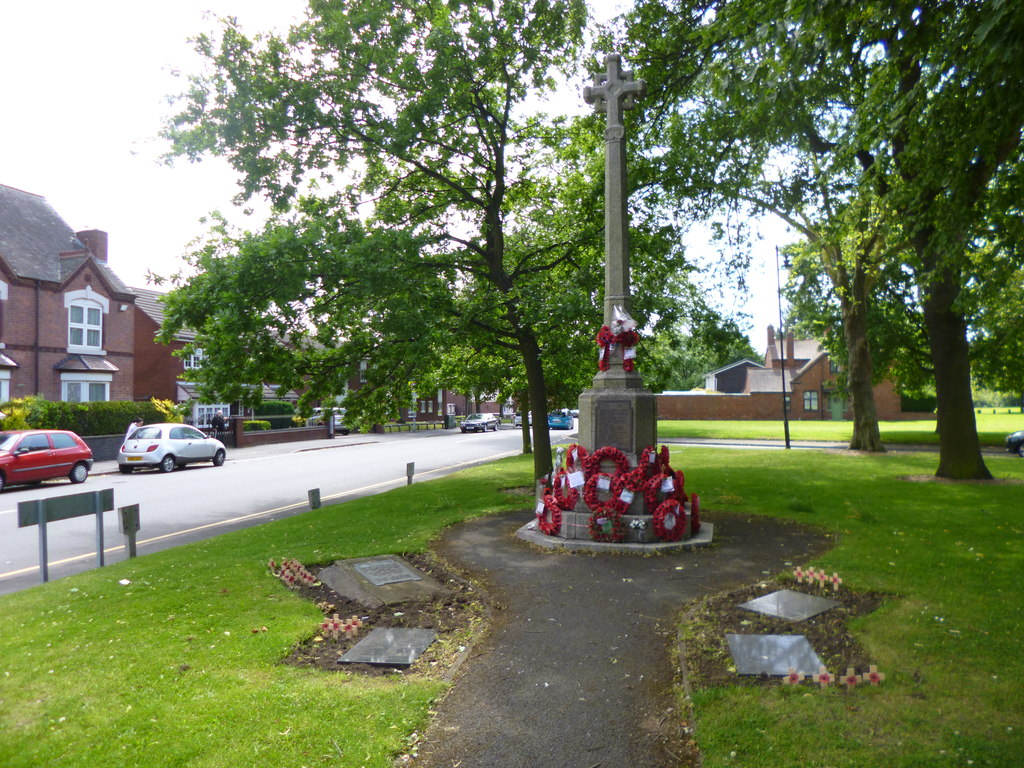
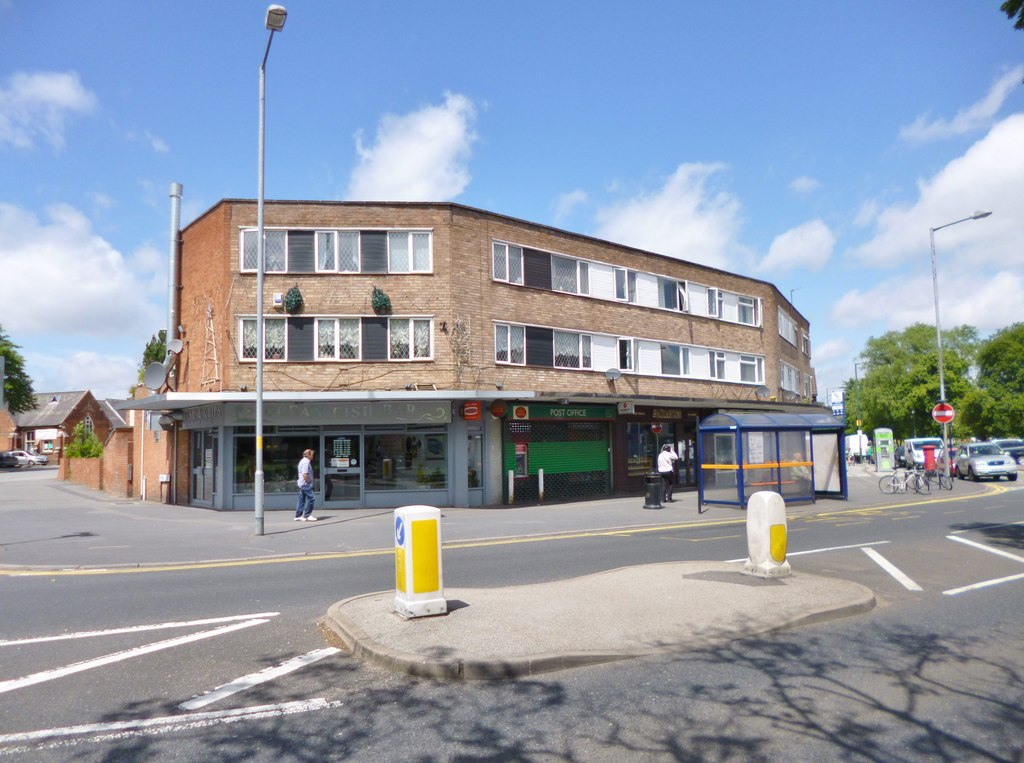
- Clockwise from top: Pelsall Parish Church, Old Railway Line, Village, Memorial and Common

- Location within the West Midlands
- Population: 11,371 (2021 Ward)
- OS grid reference: SK020037
- Metropolitan borough: Walsall
- Metropolitan county: West Midlands
- Region: West Midlands
- Country: England
- Sovereign state: United Kingdom
- Suburbs of the village: List: Heath End; Pelsall Wood; Ryders Hayes
- Post town: WALSALL
- Postcode district: WS3
- Dialling code: 01922
- Police: West Midlands
- Fire: West Midlands
- Ambulance: West Midlands
- UK Parliament: Aldridge-Brownhills

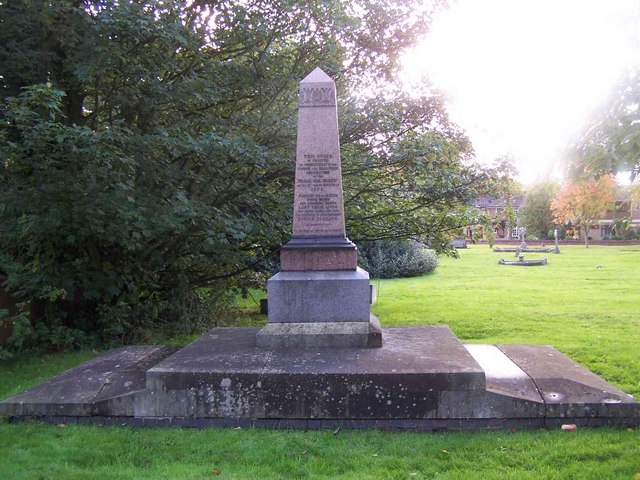
Memorial to the Pelsall Hall Colliery mining disaster

Pelsall is a village in the Metropolitan Borough of Walsall, West Midlands, England. Forming part of the borough's border with Staffordshire, Pelsall is 3 miles (4.8 km) north of Walsall and midway between the towns of Bloxwich and Brownhills. It became a centre for coal mining and the site of an iron works in the 19th century. Pelsall is known for its commons. The Wyrley and Essington Canal is nearby.

== History ==
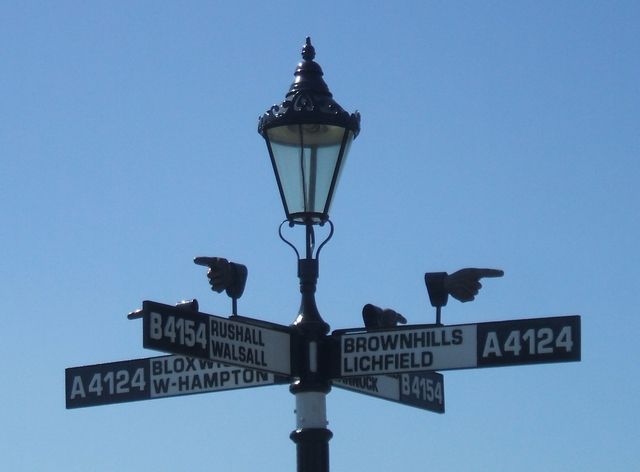
The Fingerpost Sign in Pelsall

Pelsall was first mentioned in a charter of 994, when it was among various lands given to the monastery at Heantune (Wolverhampton) by Wulfrun, a Mercian noblewoman. At this time, it was called Peolshalh, meaning 'a nook' or 'land between two streams belonging to Peol'. The Domesday entry of 1086 describes Pelsall as being waste, still belonging to the church. A chapel of ease was built in about 1311. The medieval population was small and a return of 1563 lists only 14 householders. The original centre of the area is now known as Old Town. In 1760 the remaining open fields were enclosed, but some holdings survived into the next century in Hall Field, High Ley, The Riddings Field and Final Field. The tithe map of about 1840 records some evidence of the medieval strip farming system.

In the second quarter of the 19th century, clusters of houses were built on the fringes of the extensive common land and at the Newlands. The greatest concentration was in what is now the village centre. This area gradually developed; a Methodist Chapel and school were opened in about 1836, in the modern-day Station Road and a new St Michael's Church was built in 1844 – the old one in Paradise Lane had been considered too small for the growing population. Towards the end of the 19th century, shops became established in Norton Road and High Street. The population in 1801 was 477 and by 1901 had grown to 3,626. Pelsall had become a mining village; in places deposits of coal were found only a few yards from the surface and by about 1800 the shallow and deep seams were 'much worked'. The cutting of the canal in about 1794 opened up the area for industrialisation, with entrepreneurs and landowners quickly exploiting the mineral wealth. Nailmaking, traditionally a cottage industry, was also carried out locally; in the census of 1841 thirty men stated this as their occupation.

On 14 November 1872, 22 miners died when the Pelsall Hall Colliery was flooded. 21 of the 22 miners were buried underneath a polished granite obelisk in the churchyard of St Michael and All Angels Church.

An ironworks was established on the North Common which grew into a sizeable concern under the ownership of Messrs. Davis and Bloomer. This, together with Yorks Foundry and that of Ernest Wilkes and Co. at Mouse Hill, gave Pelsall a share of the heavy iron trade during the 19th century. Ernest Wilkes and Co. survived until 1977, but the others ceased trading in the 1890s and the pits became unworkable, mainly due to continual flooding problems. Several working farms survived in the local area until after the Second World War. Since then much land has been used for housing development but the ancient common remains.

== Governance ==
Pelsall is part of the Aldridge-Brownhills Parliamentary constituency. The seat has been held by the Conservative Party since 3 May 1979.

Pelsall Ward has three seats on Walsall Metropolitan Borough Council. As of February 2025, Pelsall is represented by three Conservative councillors.

Pelsall was formerly a township and chapelry in the parish of Wolverhampton, in 1866 Pelsall became a separate civil parish, on 1 April 1966 the parish was abolished to form Aldridge Brownhills, part also went to Cannock. In 1951 the parish had a population of 4954.

== Landmarks ==
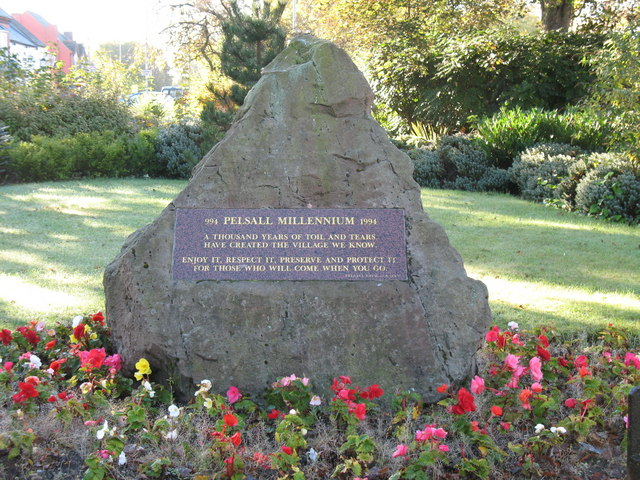
Pelsall Millennium Stone

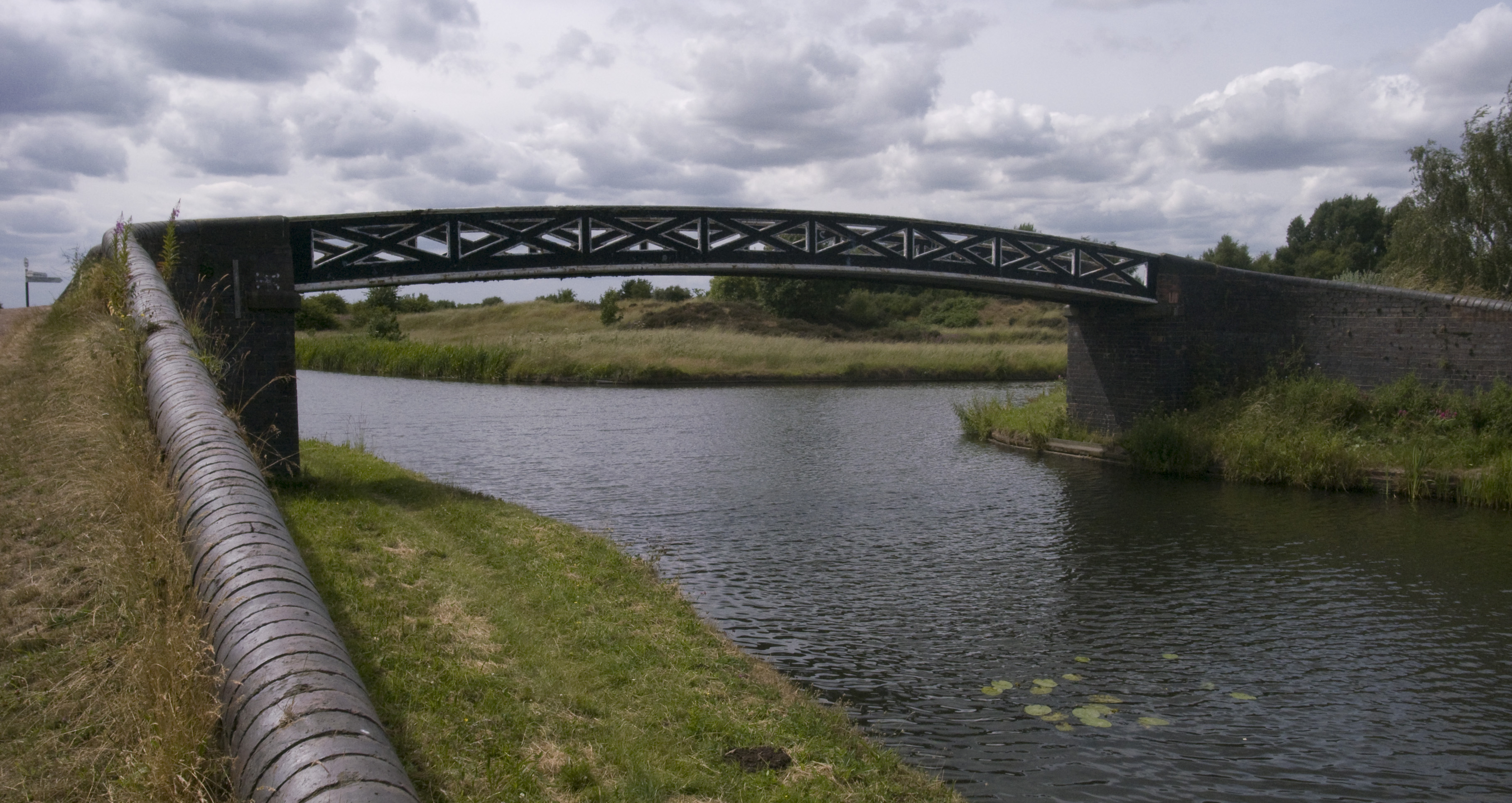
Pelsall Junction on Wyrley and Essington Canal

The Fingerpost, at the junction of B4154 Norton Road and A4124 Lichfield Road, is an unusual and possibly unique design, being substantially restored in the 1980s by Bert Kellitt for the local Civic Society. The arms of the post were replaced in 2007. Pelsall Social Club is at the junction of these roads. Since the late 1990s, Pelsall has had a Millennium Stone, marking the 994–1994 millennium of the village.

Pelsall is quite 'green' with a large turf central common around which previously stood several public houses: only The Railway and The Queens (formerly The Block & Chopper) survive today, with The Old House at Home further up towards the Fingerpost. Pelsall Carnival takes place in July each year, featuring decorated floats and bric-a-brac stalls. It has run continuously since 1972 with the exception of 2020.

The main shopping area serving the town is bordered by Norton Road and High Street and includes a range of shops, including a butcher, plus a variety of food outlets. On the northern edge of the village centre there is The Old House at Home public house, while the Fingerpost pub (formerly The Royal Oak) is situated just north of the Fingerpost road junction at Yorks Bridge, near to Pelsall Junction on the Wyrley and Essington Canal, and Nest Common and North Common, on the border with South Staffordshire. Pelsall has lost several pubs in recent years, including The Free Trade in Wood Lane, which, though the building remains, has been closed for several years, and The Swan on Wolverhampton Road, which in 2007 was converted to an Indian restaurant. The Red Cow public house and its car park have been converted into flats; the Old Bush stands derelict after several arson attacks and is now subject to a proposal by Aldi to build a supermarket and care home on the site.

In 1997, the Donna Cooper Memorial Garden off Goscote Lane was created in memory of thirteen-year-old Donna Cooper, who died after being knocked over by a stolen car outside her home in Pelsall Lane, Rushall in 1993. The garden was commissioned by Walsall Metropolitan Borough Council, who also maintain it. The entrance consists of an arched gateway that contains an owl motif, taken from a design drawn by Donna shortly before her death. The garden is 200 metres (656 ft) long and 25 metres (82 ft) wide.

== Transport ==
=== Bus ===
National Express West Midlands operates service 9 to Wolverhampton via Bloxwich, Wednesfield and New Cross Hospital, while service 8 links Pelsall to Brownhills, Ogley Hay, Clayhanger, Burntwood and Lichfield; both services also go to Walsall. Pelsall is also served by Walsall Community Transport service 25 to Bloxwich, Aldridge, Pheasey and Kingstanding.

=== Rail ===
The nearest railway stations are Bloxwich and Bloxwich North on the Chase Line.

Pelsall railway station on the South Staffordshire Line to the east of the village closed to passengers in the 1960s and to freight in the 1980s; only the main road bridges survive.

A branch line to Norton Junction opened in 1858 to connect Pelsall and Cannock via Norton Canes, necessitated a junction at Ryders Hayes Crossing. In 1865 a connection was made to the coal pits at Pelsall Common, however this was closed in 1903. Ryders Hayes station is listed in an 1866 railway handbook. A connection was also made to Pelsall Colliery and Pelsall Iron Works at Pelsall Wood. Ryders Hayes Crossing was later upgraded to accommodate both the main line and the sidings as a marshalling yard for coal and mineral trucks from the Cannock collieries around the region and had a signal box and cross keeper's cottage.

The line and stations between Walsall and Lichfield closed to passenger services in 1964. The line to Norton Junction was closed in 1981, followed by the Walsall and Lichfield line in 1984.

In 2000, the track bed from Walsall to Pelsall was made into part of the SUSTRANS National Cycle Route 5 and now forms the McClean Way greenway between Walsall and Lichfield, named after John Robinson McClean. A replacement line has been mooted since the early 2000s, but potential low demand has prevented this. A study carried out in 2009 by the Department for Transport suggested a new station at each of Pelsall and Brownhills. The route through Pelsall has been identified as a disused rail corridor with a long-term ambition to provide a rail service.

== Ethnicity and religion ==
Pelsall is predominately White British with the remainder comprising 1.2% Asian and 2.8% other, making the ward of Pelsall 96% white and 4% non-white minorities. Christianity is the largest religion in the village at 75% of the population, followed by no religion at 18%.

=== Places of worship ===
The parish church of Pelsall is St Michael & All Angels Church. Other places of worship are Pelsall Evangelical Church and Pelsall Methodist Church.

== Education ==
Pelsall is home to three primary schools: St Michael's C of E Primary, Pelsall Village School and Ryders Hayes School (now an academy). Additionally, First Friends Day Nursery is located at the Pelsall Education Development Centre.

Pelsall was previously served by Pelsall Comprehensive School, although this was technically over the border in neighbouring Rushall. It opened in the autumn of 1963 as an 11–15 secondary modern school before adopting 13–18 comprehensive status in September 1972. The transfer age was reduced to 11 in September 1986 under Walsall's reorganisation of education in the former Aldridge-Brownhills area but falling pupil numbers led to its closure in July 1994. The old Pelsall Comprehensive buildings are now home to Rushall JMI School, Education Walsall offices, and a teacher training centre.

== Sport ==
Pelsall's main football team was Pelsall Villa, formed in 1961, which played in the Midland Football League until 2018 when it disbanded. The club's former ground on Walsall Road neighbours Pelsall Cricket Club and the derelict Old Bush pub.

== Open spaces ==
=== Pelsall Common ===
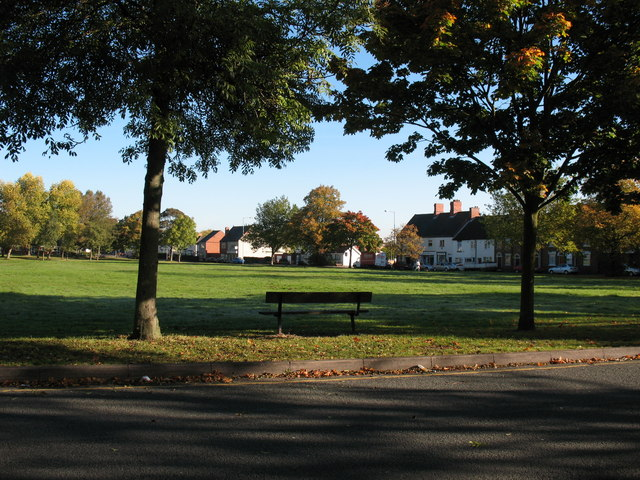
Pelsall Common

Pelsall Common is a large open space in the middle of the village. Andy Foster, in his revised Birmingham and the Black Country volume in the Pevsner Buildings of England series, considers the "hourglass-shaped common" Pelsall's most "memorable" feature. It is split into four areas and incorporates a play park, church hall and a footpath. There is a small housing estate at its northern end. Pelsall Common along with surrounding roads and St Michael's Church form the Pelsall Common Conservation Area, designated in 1979. At the northern edge of the common stands the Grade II listed Pelsall Memorial Cross, described in the listing as "tall and elegant". Inscribed on bronze plaques are the names of servicemen and women from the area, who lost their lives in the First and Second World Wars.

In 2024 volunteers planted Tormentil, Harebell and Cat's Ear to attract the Tormentil Mining Bee to the common at Heath End, where there is also a wildlife pool. The common stages many of the attractions of Pelsall Carnival.

=== Pelsall North Common ===
Pelsall North Common is a Site of Importance for Nature Conservation and a Local Nature Reserve, in part open heath land.

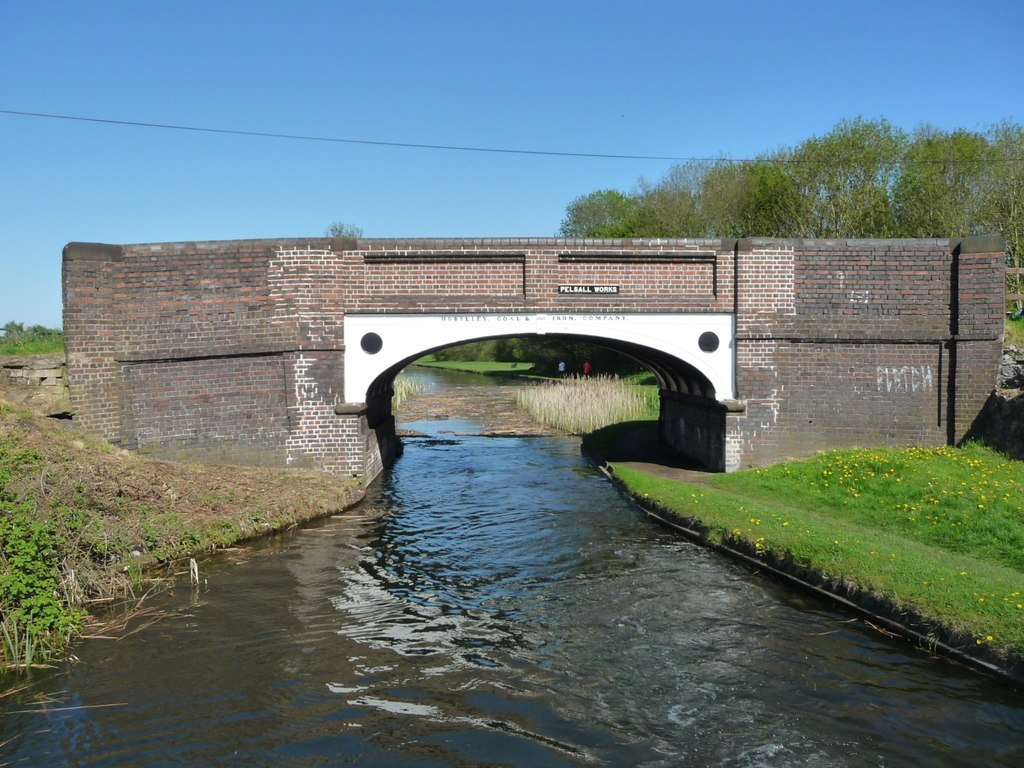
Pelsall Works Bridge

The Wyrley and Essington Canal divides the common, the two areas being linked by the Pelsall Junction and Pelsall Works bridges.

Points of interest around the common include:

- The Cannock Extension Canal - A partially disused canal that connected Pelsall to Cannock. It now only runs from the junction at Pelsall to the A5 Road/Watling Street at North Lanes and Norton Canes.
- The Fingerpost Pub - A public house situated above the canal and off Norton Road.
- Pelsall Iron Works Site - The site of the former Pelsall Iron Works, opened in 1832 by Richard Fryer from Lord Hatherton. The site of the Iron Works are now part of the common.
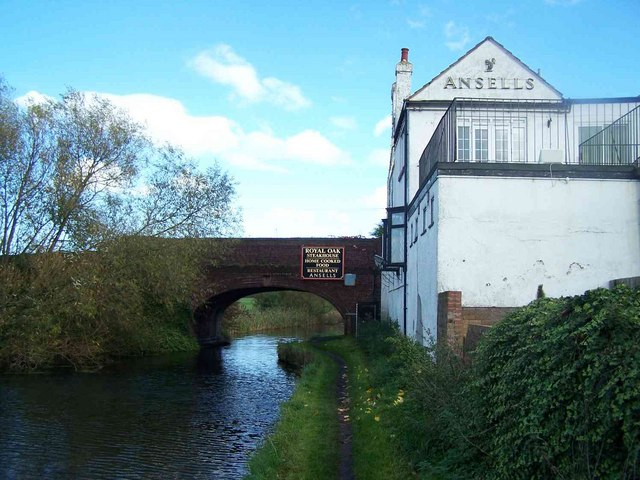
  Yorks Bridge and the Fingerpost Pub (formerly the Royal Oak)
- Pelsall Junction - A junction for the Wyrley and Essington Canal and Cannock Extension Canal. The footbridge crossing the Wyrley and Essington Canal is a Grade II listed building.
- Pelsall Works Bridge - The former entry to the Pelsall Iron Works, now used for public and cycle access to both Fishley Lane and the canal's footpath to the common. It is a Grade II listed building.
- York's Bridge - A Victorian-era, single-file humped road bridge across the canal on the B4154 connecting Pelsall to Norton Canes. Work started in September 2024 to construct a wider road bridge alongside to allow for two-way traffic and a footpath. Protected great crested newts had to be relocated prior to work commencing.

== Areas of Pelsall ==
=== Pelsall Wood ===
Pelsall Wood is an area 1 mile (1.6 km) to the northwest of Pelsall village, close to Pelsall North Common.

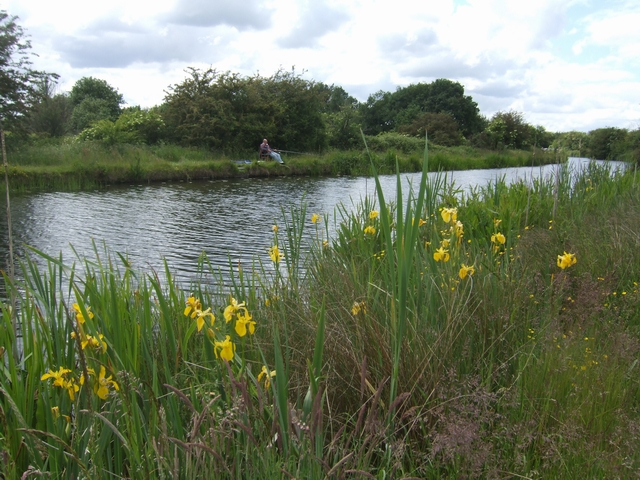
The Wyrley and Essington Canal, the site of Pelsall Iron Works was across the canal

A late 19th century Ordnance Survey map shows an iron works in close proximity to the Wyrley and Essington Canal; nearby were the Freetrade Inn and a smithy. The inn, which had been in existence since 1735, closed for good in 2005 and was left abandoned; it was converted into three houses in 2018. Pelsall Wood Colliery was opened by the Pelsall Coal & Iron Company, which was purchased by the Walsall Wood Colliery in 1894. It continued to operate until the coal deposits at the site were depleted. An entry from Walsall Wood in history by Walsall Council, states that "In the late 19th century the Company took over the Pelsall Coal & Iron Company, whose engineer developed and put into use one of the first coal cutting machines in the country". After closure of the colliery, the area around it was redeveloped for housing. Building of the estate was undertaken by Aldridge Urban District Council.

The A4124/Wolverhampton Road passes through the area. There is a regular bus service, operated by National Express West Midlands between Walsall, Bloxwich, Wednesfield and Wolverhampton. Additional buses operated by Walsall Community Transport link the area to Kingstanding, Brownhills, Leamore and Brownhills West.

=== Heath End ===
Heath End, on the southern edge of Pelsall Common, was a separate hamlet in the 19th century, historically known as Cod End.

=== Ryders Hayes ===
Farmland between Ryders Hayes Lane and Railswood Drive was developed for council housing in the 1960s. In 1967, one of the main streets into the estate named "Ryders Hayes Lane" was mentioned in a 1967 Motor Sport article by William Boddy. In 1970, houses near the Gilpin Arm of the Wyrley and Essington Canal and the New Inns public house were demolished and replaced by modern housing. Following closure of the railway between Norton Canes and Pelsall in the 1980s, the trackbed, sidings and part of the former Ryders Hayes Crossing goods yard were redeveloped for housing.

Ryders Hayes School on Gilpin Crescent is an academy converter primary school. A bus route, operated by Walsall Community Transport connects the estate with Bloxwich and Kingstanding via Pelsall, Aldridge and Pheasey.

== Notable people ==
- J. P. Wearing (born 1945), an Anglo-American theatre historian and professor, writes about 19thC. & 20thC. drama and theatre
- Robert Emery (born 1983), pianist, conductor, music producer and orchestrator.

=== Sport ===
- Colin Harrison (born 1946), football full back, played 473 games for Walsall F.C.
- Phil Gee (born 1964), footballer, played over 180 games, mainly for Derby County F.C.
- Lee Sinnott (born 1965), football manager and former player who played 527 games.
- Andrea Dallaway (born 1970), canoe sprinter and three time Olympic participant.
- Steve Hayward (born 1971), former footballer who played 308 games, 138 for Fulham F.C.
