= Jack Harrington =

Jack Harrington may refer to:

- Jack Harrington (Australian footballer)
- Jack Harrington (English footballer)
