= Rumer Hill Junction =

Canal junction in England

Coordinates: 52.6784°N 2.0132°W

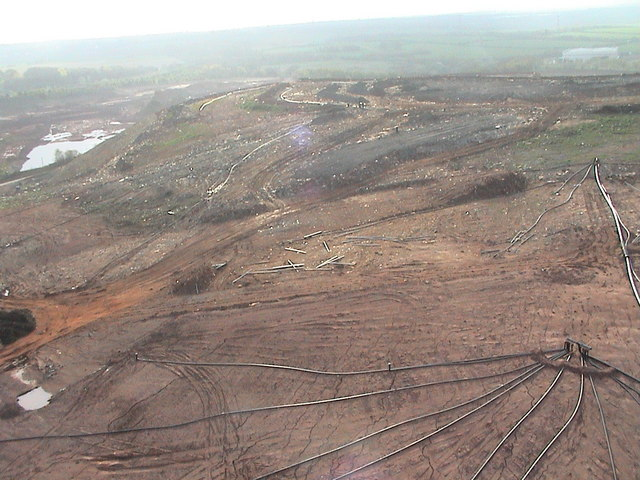
- Rumer Hill Junction was in the centre left of this landfill site, which is filling the void left by opencast mining.

Specifications
- Status: Destroyed

History
- Date completed: 1859
- Date closed: 1953

Rumer Hill Junction (grid reference SJ991090) was a canal junction on the Cannock Extension Canal where the Churchbridge Branch left to join the Hatherton Canal. The junction, along with the northern section of the canal was abandoned in 1963. The Churchbridge Branch and Rumer Hill Junction were subsequently obliterated by opencast mining.

== History ==
Following the amalgamation of the Birmingham Canal Navigations and the Wyrley and Essington Canal in April 1840, the company had constructed a number of extensions to their system, and as they had proved to be profitable, a further programme was begun in 1854. Included in this batch was the Cannock Extension Canal, to run from Pelsall Junction on the Wyrley and Essington to Hednesford, where there were coal mines. The canal was opened from Pelsall Junction to Rumer Hill Junction in 1858, and completed to Hednesford Basin in 1863.

At the start of the extension programme, the Birmingham Canal Navigations and the Staffordshire and Worcestershire Canal agreed to build a link between the Cannock Extension Canal and the Hatherton Branch of the Staffordshire and Worcestershire. It already reached Churchbridge, and the connecting link only required a flight of thirteen locks to accommodate the difference in levels. The land on which the link would be built was purchased jointly by the two companies, but the Staffordshire and Worcestershire Canal seems to have funded the actual construction. The locks were built in 1858 and 1859, but were not used until the opening of the Cannock Extension Canal in 1863. Through much of its life, the junction was busy, with around 12,000 tons per month passing through it and down the locks in 1902.

The date when the Hatherton Branch and the Churchbridge locks ceased to be used is given as 1949 by Hadfield and 1953 by Shill, but in either case, the junction closed around this time. By 1958, a concrete barrier had been built at the top lock of the Churchbridge flight, to prevent loss of water through the locks. The Cannock Extension Canal was increasingly affected by subsidence from the coal mines it served, and the northern section, including Rumer Hill Junction, closed in 1963. The junction and the surrounding canal were destroyed by subsequent open-cast coal mining.

Whilst restoration of the Hatherton Canal is proposed, the restored canal was planned to join the Cannock Extension Canal further south, at Grove Basin, and there were no proposals to restore any of the canals leading to the junction. Subsequent objections to the revised route have resulted in a second new route being planned, which connects to the Lord Hayes Branch of the Wyrley and Essington Canal, rather than the Cannock Extension Canal.

== Location ==
Rumer Hill Junction was situated about halfway along the 4.1-mile (6.6 km) section of the Cannock Extension Canal which was abandoned in 1963, so was about 2 miles (3.2 km) from Hednesford Basin, and 3.6 miles (5.8 km) from Pelsall Junction. The canal was level in both directions, as it was all built on the 473-foot (144 m) Wolverhampton Level of the Birmingham Canal system. The locks of the Churchbridge flight started immediately after the junction. The flight headed to the south-west, while the Extension Canal ran from the north-west to the south-east at this point. Washbrook Lane crossed the Extension Canal just to the south of the junction at High Bridge, and just beyond that was Leacroft Wharf, its entrance crossed by a towpath bridge. It served the Cannock and Leacroft Colliery, to which it was connected by a short tramway, which ran through a tunnel as it left the wharf in 1902. The tunnel had been opened out by 1918. By the time the 1957/1962 map was published, the tramway had been dismantled, Leacroft Wharf was disused, Washbrook Lane had been destroyed to the south of the canal, and only the top lock of the Churchbridge flight remained.

== See also ==
- Canals of the United Kingdom
- History of the British canal system

== Bibliography ==
- Atkins (February 2009). Hatherton Canal Restoration Supplementary Feasibility Report (PDF). Lichfield and Hatherton Canals Restoration Trust.
- Cumberlidge, Jane (2009). Inland Waterways of Great Britain (8th Ed.). Imray Laurie Norie and Wilson. ISBN 978-1-84623-010-3.
- Hadfield, Charles (1985). The Canals of the West Midlands. David and Charles. ISBN 0-7153-8644-1.
- Nicholson (2006). Nicholson Guide Vol 2 - Severn, Avon & Birmingham. Harper Collins. ISBN 978-0-00-721110-4.
- Shill, Ray (2002). The Birmingham Canal Navigations. Tempus Publishing. ISBN 0-7524-2767-9.
