= Raymond Bristow =

The Reverend Raymond Bristow
- Born: Arthur George Raymond Bristow; 3 June 1909
- Died: 25 July 2007 (aged 98)
- Religion: Christianity
- Church: Church of England
- Ordained: 1935 (deacon); 1936 (priest)

Arthur George Raymond Bristow (born 3 June 1909, Wiltshire - died 25 July 2007 Staffordshire) was an English Anglican priest. Bristow was longest serving priest in the Church of England at the time of his death in 2007.

== Biography ==
Bristow trained for Holy Orders at Lichfield Theological College, a theological college that did not require a degree, from 1932 to 1935. He was ordained in the Church of England as a deacon in 1935 at Lichfield Cathedral. He was formally ordained as an Anglican priest in 1936. Bristow served his first curacy at St Mary and St Chad's Church which is located in Longton, Stoke-on-Trent. Father Bristow also served in Lichfield, as well as the Diocese of Birmingham, the Diocese of Coventry, the Diocese of Rochester, the Diocese of Oxford and the Diocese of Sheffield during his 70-year career. His final full-time post was as vicar of St Stephen's Church, Willenhall in the Diocese of Lichfield from 1957 to 1975.

Bristow officially retired in 1975. However, the Bishop of Lichfield licensed Bristow with the permission to officiate and lead the Sunday mass after his retirement.

Bristow celebrated the 70th anniversary of his ordination as a priest in September 2006. He was quoted at the time as saying, "They tell me it's a bit of a do, but I don't know much about it." Bristow continued to actively assist with Anglican services at St James' Church in Norton Canes, Staffordshire, until October 2006.

Bristow died at Abbey Court Nursing Home in Staffordshire on 25 July 2007. He was 98 years old.
