= Rumer =

Rumer may refer to:

- Rumer (musician) (born 1979), British singer
- Rumer Willis (born 1988), American actress, daughter of Bruce Willis and Demi Moore
- Rumer Godden (1907–1998), English author
- Yuriy Rumer (1901–1985), Russian physicist also known as Georg Rumer

== See also ==
- Rumer Hill Junction, a canal junction on the Cannock Extension Canal where the Churchbridge Branch left to join the Hatherton Canal, England
- Rumor, spelled rumour in British English
