= Norton Canes High School =

Location
- Burntwood Road; Norton Canes; Staffordshire, WS11 9SP; England
- Coordinates: 52.67912°N 1.96685°W

Information
- Type: Community school
- Local authority: Staffordshire
- Department for Education URN: 124395 Tables
- Ofsted: Reports
- Headteacher: Sarah Diggory
- Gender: Coeducational
- Age: 11 to 18
- Enrolment: 490 as of April 2022
- Colours: blue, red, black,
- Website: http://www.nortoncaneshighschool.co.uk/

Norton Canes High School is a coeducational secondary school and sixth form located in Norton Canes in the English county of Staffordshire.

It is a community school administered by Staffordshire County Council. The school also specialises in mathematics and computing.

Norton Canes High School offers GCSEs and BTECs as programmes of study for pupils, while students in the sixth form have the option to study from a range of A-levels, Cambridge Nationals and further BTECs.
