= Norton Junction (Staffordshire) =

Former railway junction and goods yard in Staffordshire, England

General information
- Location: Norton Canes, Cannock Chase District Council; United Kingdom
- Coordinates: 52.668620°N 1.967449°W

Other information
- Status: Disused

History
- Original company: Midland Railway and South Staffordshire Railway joint

Key dates
- 25 April 1879: Opened
- 1964: Closed

Norton Junction was a railway junction and goods yard that served multiple coal lines and mineral lines to and from the local collieries and other industrial-related businesses, most notably Pelsall Steelworks and Walsall Wood Colliery.

== Closure ==
Traffic into the junction began to decline in the 1950s following closure of many local mines and collieries. The lines to Ryders Hayes, Brownhills and Hednesford had all closed by 1964, so there was no junction. The South Staffs line remained as a through route between Walsall and Lichfield until 1984. Shortly afterward, no tracks remained at Norton junction.

== Present day ==
The entire site has been built on by housing and roads but some of the trackbed can still be followed as far as Pelsall and Brownhills.
