= James Adams (footballer, born 1908) =

English footballer

Personal information
- Date of birth: 4 January 1908
- Place of birth: Norton Canes, England
- Date of death: 18 August 1979 (aged 71)
- Place of death: West Bromwich, England
- Height: 5 ft 9 in (1.75 m)
- Position: Goalkeeper

Senior career*
Years	Team	Apps	(Gls)
- Cannock Chase Colliery
- Cannock Town
1929–1945	West Bromwich Albion	100	(0)
- * Club domestic league appearances and goals

James Adams (4 January 1908 – 19 August 1979) was an English footballer who played as a goalkeeper in the Football League for West Bromwich Albion.

He was with the club when they won the FA Cup in 1931 and reached the final again in 1935, but at that time Harold Pearson was first choice in the position, a situation which did not change until the 1936–37 season. Adams eventually made 100 league appearances for the Baggies across a ten-year period leading up to the outbreak of the Second World War, and as many again in the unofficial competitions held during the conflict, before retiring in 1945. He also played for Cannock Chase Colliery and Cannock Town.
