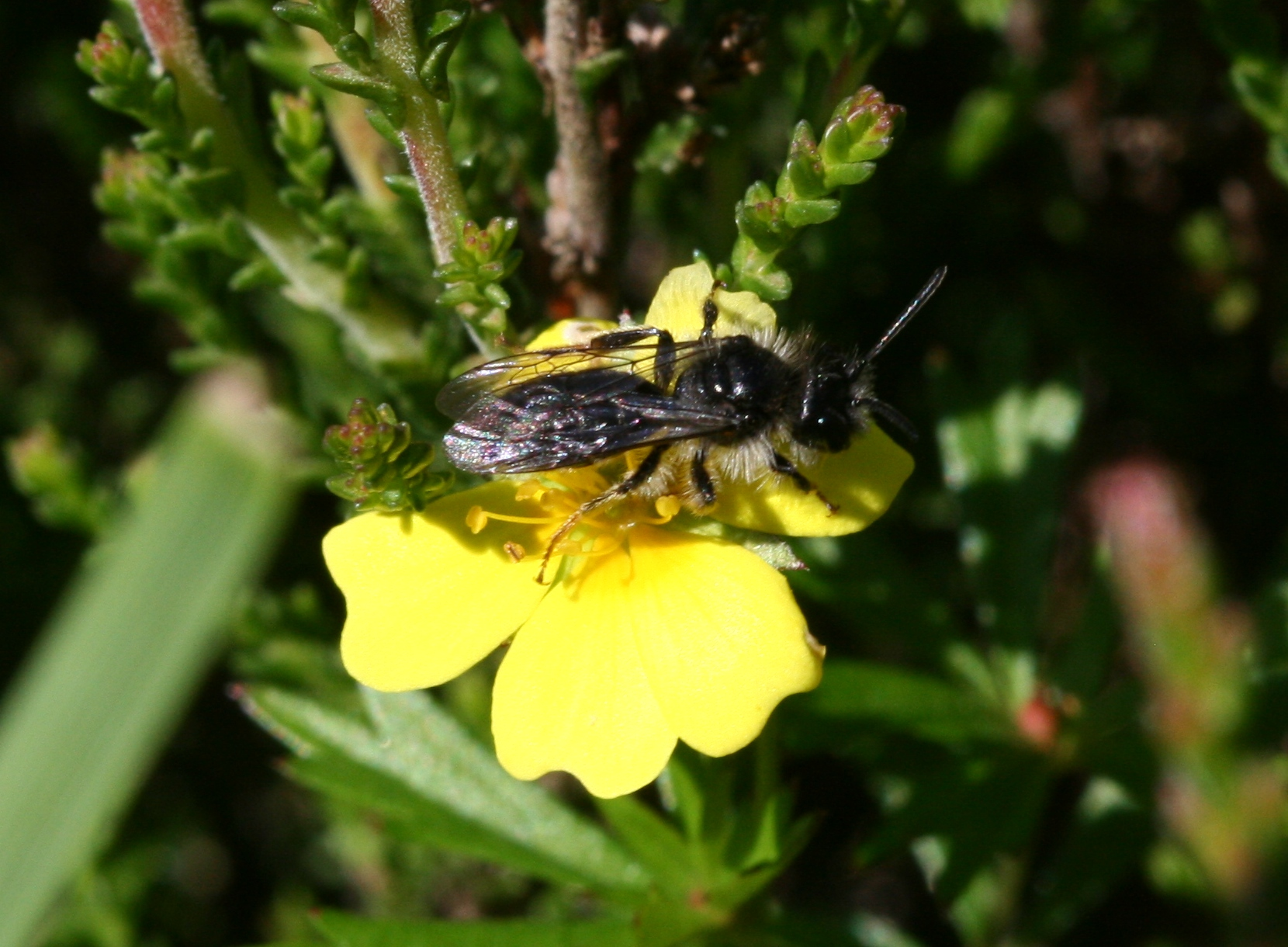

Conservation status
- Data Deficient (IUCN 3.1)

Scientific classification
- Kingdom: Animalia
- Phylum: Arthropoda
- Clade: Pancrustacea
- Class: Insecta
- Order: Hymenoptera
- Family: Andrenidae
- Genus: Andrena
- Species: A. tarsata

Binomial name
- Andrena tarsata Nylander, 1848

Synonyms
- Andrena baicalensis Cockerell, 1929; Andrena basilinea Kriechbaumer, 1873; Andrena gentianae Vachal, 1906; Andrena universitatis Cockerell, 1929

= Tormentil mining bee =

Species of bee

The tormentil mining bee (Andrena tarsata) is a species of mining bee from the family Andrenidae which has a Palearctic distribution.

== Description ==
The tormentil mining bee is a smallish species of mining bee but a distinguishing feature on the females is that the hind legs have orange tibia and tarsi and the thorax is partially covered above with black hairs and the propodeum being covered in dense pale grey hairs at each side. The abdomen is black and shiny with each tergite having a thin pale edging along its rear margin. The females, uniquely among the British species of the genus Andrena, have a tridentate mandible. The males have a yellow front to their clypeus and can be told apart from other similar male mining bees by having black hairs on the thorax and tarsi which are partially orange in colour. The male also has a shiny black abdomen and thorax.

== Distribution ==
The tormentil mining bee has been described as a boreo-alpine species which in Europe has a northerly distribution and which becomes rarer in the south. Its range extends from Ireland to China, Mongolia and the Russian Far East. In Great Britain it is widely distributed, although it is much rarer and more localised in Ireland and absent from the Channel Islands.

== Habitat and ecology ==
The tormentil mining bee occurs in a variety habitats which have acidic soils and an abundance of tormentils Potentilla, alongside marsh cinquefoil and shrubby cinquefoil. They also prefer areas which receive sunlight but are sheltered to maximise the heat they receive in heaths, moors, acid grasslands, rushy pastures and clearings in woodlands. They will also colonise newly disturbed ground like cleared woodland plots and former quarries. They will use rides through woodland and the verges of roads as corridors which allow them to move between sites. This species prefers to nest on sunlit, bare banks of earth which face to the south. Pathways and tracks which have bare earth may also be used for nesting. The main requirement is that there should be dense stands of Potentilla within 250m of nest sites. The bees collect pollen from the Potentilla flowers which they use to provision their nests as a food source for the larva. Each bee excavates its own nest and they nest in aggregations. The adults fly from June to late August and have been recorded nectaring on bramble, harebell, ling, wild angelica and yarrow but tormentils are required for the provisioning the nest cells. The tormentil nomad bee (Nomada roberjeotiana) and Nomada obtusifrons are cleptoparasites of the tormentil mining bee and they have also been recorded as being host to Strepsipteran endoparasites.

== Conservation ==
The IUCN list this species as being Data Deficient because there are gaps in the data about the population size and trends. In Europe it has been classified as rare, threatened or extinct in the National Red Lists of seven states. In the United Kingdom it is described as nationally scarce and the causes of its decline are thought to be the loss, fragmentation and deterioration of habitat as a result of agricultural intensification, heathland loss, overgrazing and lack of grazing.
