= Boaz Bloomer =

English industrialist

Boaz Bloomer JP was a prominent industrialist from Holly Hall in Dudley, Worcestershire, England, who lived between 1801 and 1874. He owned and operated the Pelsall Ironworks, among other ventures, during the 19th Century. He died in Kensington, Middlesex.

== Bloomer Family History ==
It is believed the Bloomers had previously worked in the iron works industry for several generations, as the name ‘Bloomer’ is an occupational surname for a maker of blooms; a word deriving from the Olde English "bloma" meaning an ‘ingot’ of iron. The Bloomer family were reasonably prominent within the area. In late 1657 Mary Bloomer married Henry Haden of Haden Hall (now Haden Hill House) at St Giles in Rowley Regis; the Bloomers were renowned within the chain making industry and the Haden family were large land owners, mine owners and industrialists. It is unclear when the family became non-conformists, but a Bloomer was baptised at the Park Lane Presbyterian chapel of Cradley register in 1742.

== Personal life ==
On 15 December 1825 Boaz Bloomer married Catherine Hornblower, a descendant of the steam engine pioneer, Joseph Hornblower, (sometimes recorded as ‘Catherine Bailey’ after her stepfather, George Bailey) at St Thomas’ Church in Dudley. Around the same time his friend and colleague Thomas Davis married Catherine Hornblower's half-sister Jane Bailey. Catherine and Boaz had eight children in total, Caleb, Boaz Jr, Esther, George, Giles, Prudence, Sarah and Benjamin. Catherine died in 1849 and Boaz married his second wife, Emily Treffrey, shortly after in 1852.

== The Pelsall Ironworks ==
Davis and Boaz became business partners and in 1846 they bought the Pelsall Ironworks in Pelsall, Staffordshire (now the Metropolitan Borough of Walsall). The Pelsall Ironworks had opened in 1832 and was built by Mr. Richard Fryer, a Wolverhampton banker and MP who died in 1846.

In William White's 1851 History, Gazetteer, and Directory of Staffordshire the ironworks was listed as producing bar and sheet iron of the best quality.

On 6 June 1865 the London Gazette reported that Boaz Bloomer had bought out Davis's share of the company, and would now run it with his son, Boaz Bloomer Jr. They also bought several coal mines, which in addition to selling coal as far afield as London, supplied the ironworks with the coal necessary to keep their engines running. They changed the name of the business to The Pelsall Coal and Iron Company. It grew into an extensive and highly profitable ironworks with two blast furnaces, forty puddling furnaces, seven mills and forges, a gashouse and gasometer, and a large tramway with locomotive and wagon sheds. The company exported all over the world, from the United States to China and India, with nails going to Canada, Norway and Sweden. To mark this success, when a public house opened next to the iron works it named itself the 'Free Trade Inn'.

== Methodism, philanthropy and public service ==
The Bloomer family were known as staunch Methodists and local benefactors. They were greatly involved in the building of the New Wesleyan Methodist Chapel which opened on 14 July 1859. The chapel was a large, galleried building, to which Boaz had donated the land and supported the cost of construction. To repay their kindness Boaz Bloomer was made treasurer of the new chapel. They also helped finance the Wesleyan day school in 1866. As a result, Chapel Street became a hub for Wesleyan Methodists in the area. During the 1880s, the road was developed by the Bloomers further as houses were built near to the chapel and schools to house the employees of the ironworks. The Bloomers became prominent members of the local Methodist community. Emily Bloomer was invited to lay the foundation stone for the new Wesleyan Chapel in Walsall Wood on 19 May 1862, and was presented with a "handsome silver trowel and mahogany mallet" as a gift from the ladies present.

To help their employees further in the 1860s Boaz Bloomer opened a room at the iron works where daily newspapers and periodicals were available for employees to read. The ironworks had a truck system, known as a ‘Tommy shop ‘in Wood Lane near the canal bridge, where the employees could exchange tokens for goods at a supposedly cheaper cost than in a regular shop.

Boaz was a Grand Juror during the 1840s and later became a Magistrate at some point in the 1860s, overseeing a number of petty sessions in Rushall on subjects from victualler licensing to manslaughter. His son, Boaz Jr, would go on to sit on the local Board of Guardians while his other son, Caleb, would be elected to the Improvement Commission.

In the late 1860s Boaz Bloomer introduced a scheme to help employees pay for their children's education. Boaz Bloomer believed so strongly in the need for education that, following the success of his scheme, by 1868 he had made it a condition of employment that all of an employee's children received schooling.

== Transport to Pelsall ==
The Wyrley and Essington Canal was one of the core means of transport between the various industries in Wolverhampton. Many private canal branches were constructed to help businesses. One such link, known as ‘Gilpin's Arm’, went to the Pelsall Ironworks. The Bloomer family bought a steam powered pumping engine to pump water out of their coal pits and into the canal. According to the Birmingham Canal Proprietors Minutes, dated 29 December 1871, Mr Williams (the canal owner) had agreed to pay Boaz Bloomer the sum of "£5 a lock for all water pumped by him into the canal by his Newland Engine and his No 8 Engine an indicator being fixed to each engine". This was agreed because water supply was an important issue to midland canal owners. As the business expanded and the industrial revolution powered on, the ironworks required a rail link, which was duly established in 1865 to the London and North Western Railway. An interchange basin was built to enable the transfer of coal from a rail carriage to a barge. During the 1860s Pelsall Ironworks initially employed Shropshire Union Railway & Coal Company barges to help haul their wears across the country.

Boaz Bloomer was a financier of the South Staffordshire Junction Railway and the railway line between Walsall and Lichfield Tent Valley

== Industrial accidents and the Pelsall Hall Colliery disaster ==
=== Pelsall Hall Colliery disaster ===
There were three major accidents at the ironworks. The first disaster occurred on Thursday 14 November 1872 when the Pelsall Ironworks saw the Pelsall Hall Colliery disaster, which lay claim to the lives of twenty two men between the ages of 13 and 89. There had been an explosion at the Pelsall Hall colliery and one of the mines had flooded. Boaz Bloomer set up the Pelsall Hall Colliery fund in honour of the men to ensure each child of the men under 14 would receive 2/6d per week and each widow until remarried or otherwise provided for would receive 9/6d per week. A memorial obelisk of Aberdeen granite was also constructed and remains there to this day. Personalised leather bound bibles were given to all the men who had aided in the rescue efforts. The initial sum donated by Bloomer exceeded 100 guineas.

=== 12 November 1879 ===
On 12 November 1879 there was another explosion at the colliery which cost six lives following an issue with gas ventilation. Mr. J. Mottram, Q.C., Judge of the Birmingham County Court found the colliery manager, Michael Harle not guilty of gross negligence but instructed him to pay the cost of the inquiry. The Bloomers permitted him to keep his job.

=== 15 December 1887 ===
On 15 December 1887 the Birmingham Post reported that a Goscote diagonal boiler had exploded the previous day at the No.9 Plant, one of the smaller coal pits owned by the company. The explosion killed three men and seriously injured four more men. Two horses were also reported as having been put down in ‘mercy’ due to the injuries they sustained. The explosion also caused damage to houses on the Wolverhampton Road and blew out all the windows of the boiler house.

== The Sycamores and The Ridings ==
The Pelsall Ironworks employed several hundred people and exported iron across the globe from China to America. Business for the Ironworks was booming. In 1870, Boaz Bloomer constructed a large house at 46 Church Road, called ‘The Sycamores’. In 1871, the house was occupied by his family, including his younger son Benjamin Bloomer. Benjamin would later go on to open his own chain making company.

Another house called The Ridings was built by Boaz in the 1870s. It was a large house with a vast tract of land and had numerous outbuildings, including a coachmans house. The name 'Riddings' is supposedly derived from the medieval clearing or ridding of forest land and is so named on an 1840s tithe map. The house was demolished in the 1960s to make way for new housing which was desperately needed after World War II. Prior to its demolition the house had continued to serve as a home, and also provided courts and a meeting point for the first Pelsall Tennis Club during the 1920s. The coachman's house still stands.

== Barrows v. Pelsall Co. ==
In 1877, Boaz Bloomer lost a trademark ruling, Barrows v. Pelsall Co, in which it was reported that "Boaz Bloomer & Sons were restrained from using B. B. S. with a crown" as their mark. This formed a small but significant case in trademark law.

== Newcastle-upon-Tyne and the Team Valley Ironworks ==
It appears that Boaz Bloomer and Son had involvement with another ironworks in Newcastle upon Tyne. Boaz Bloomer is also recorded as having owned Number 11 Osborne Terrace, a Georgian terraced house in Newcastle upon Tyne.

== Pelsall Ironworks liquidation ==
Despite setbacks it was reported that the Pelsall Ironworks company remained a success until the close of the 19th Century. When the recession hit in 1891 the firm lost £3,647.11s.7d. The company was forced into liquidation in 1892. Repayment was demanded for an overdraft of £20,000 from the bank. All of the company's coal mines were sold to the Walsall Wood Colliery Company at a reduced price. The plant was sold-off cheaply to Alfred Hickman of Bilston Steelworks before it was completely demolished in the early 1900s. It is reported the Bloomers moved out of the area. The loss of the firm sparked a crisis in Pelsall, as the Ironworks had employed most of the village. The chimney stacks were the final part of the building to be destroyed, with demolition undertaken during the 1920s.
