= Cannock Extension Canal =

Canal in England

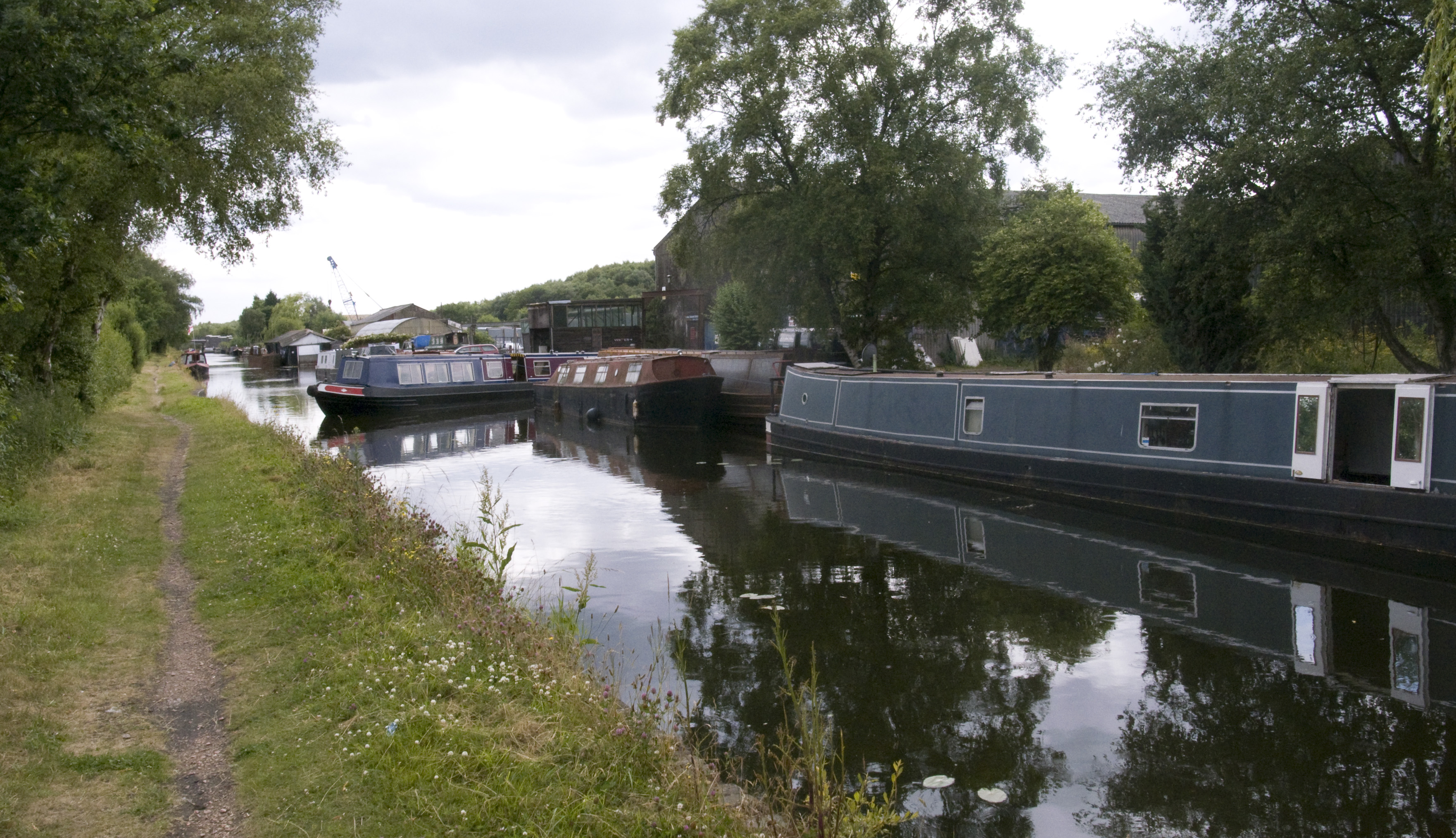
- A boat yard on the Cannock Extension Canal
- Interactive map of Cannock Extension Canal

Specifications
- Status: Part navigable, part destroyed
- Navigation authority: Canal and River Trust

History
- Date of act: Privately built
- Date completed: 1863
- Date closed: 1963

Geography
- Start point: Hednesford
- End point: Pelsall
- Connects to: Wyrley and Essington Canal

The current Cannock Extension Canal is a 1.8-mile (2.9 km) canal in England. It runs from Pelsall Junction on the Wyrley and Essington Canal, north to Norton Canes Docks and forms part of the Birmingham Canal Navigations. Historically, it ran to Hednesford, and served a number of collieries, which provided the main traffic. It opened in 1863, and the northern section closed in 1963, as a result of mining subsidence.

== History ==
Following a period of negotiations, the Birmingham Canal Navigations had been leased by the London and Birmingham Railway from November 1845. The lease meant that the railway company had to authorise all new works where the cost exceeded £500. The London and Birmingham Railway and Birmingham Canal Arrangement Act 1846 (9 & 10 Vict. c. ccxliv) was obtained on 27 July 1848 to legalise the agreement, by which time the London and Birmingham Railway had become part of the London and North Western Railway. The canal company had made a number of additions to their system in the 1840s, which had been successful in generating new traffic, and they embarked on another programme in 1854. The railway company did not object, although it imposed a condition that dividends paid to shareholders would be restricted to 4 per cent until the cost of the new works had been paid. The scheme included replacing Delph Locks on the Dudley Canal, an extension to Lord Hay's Branch, and the construction of the Cannock Extension Canal, including two feeder tramways.

The canal was opened to Rumer Hill Junction in 1858 and its 5.6-mile (9.0 km) length was fully open by 1863. A connection was made to the Hatherton Canal, a branch of the Staffordshire and Worcestershire Canal, at Churchbridge Junction via the Churchbridge Branch, which had thirteen locks. An agreement between the two companies was reached in 1854, before the Cannock Extension Canal had been built, and the cost of the land for the Churchbridge Branch was shared, but when the locks were built in 1858 and 1859, it appears that the Staffordshire and Worcestershire Canal funded the work alone. Traffic down through the Churchbridge lock flight, which originated on the Extension Canal, was around 12,000 tons per month in 1902.

As with many canals which served coal mines, subsidence was an increasing problem as the mines expanded underground. The canal side walls near Leacroft Wharf had to be rebuilt in 1934 after severe damage from subsidence. The canal company was extremely worried about the possibility of the canal breaching, and to lessen the effects should a breach occur, safety gates were fitted at a number of locations. At Northwood Bridge, there were two pairs of gates, one facing in each direction, which were designed to close if there was a large flow of water. The two sets of gates protected against a breach on either side of the bridge. In 1960, part of the canal sunk by 21 feet (6.4 m), and commercial traffic effectively stopped the following year because of the problems. The 4.5 miles (7.2 km) north of Watling Street were abandoned in 1963. The Churchbridge Branch became disused around 1953 and the whole branch and Rumer Hill Junction were later obliterated by opencast mining.

In view of the destruction of the Churchbridge Branch, the Hatherton Canal restoration plan included a proposal for a Churchbridge bypass, which would create a link to Grove Basin, but environmental concerns and objections from landowners have resulted in a revised route being identified, which will link the canal to the Lord Hayes branch of the Wyrley and Essington Canal, a little further to the west than Pelsall Junction.

== Route ==
The canal leaves the Wyrley and Essington Canal at Pelsall Junction. The towpath on the Wyrley and Essington is on the south bank, and so a footbridge is located just to the east of the junction, to connect to the Extension Canal's towpath, which is on the east bank. Pelsall Common North is a local nature reserve covering 92 acres (37 ha) to the west of the canal. It gives little clue that it was a thriving iron works between 1832 and 1888, providing employment for 100 people from the village of Pelsall. The company went bankrupt when iron prices dropped and the works was demolished in the 1920s. The canal heads north in a straight line from the junction. Friar Bridge, Pelsall Common Bridge, Green Bridge and Wyrley Grove Bridge cross the canal before the two former colliery basins are reached. A narrows just before the basins was the site of a railway bridge, which curved round the end of the basins to serve Wyrley Grove Colliery, located just to the north of the basins.

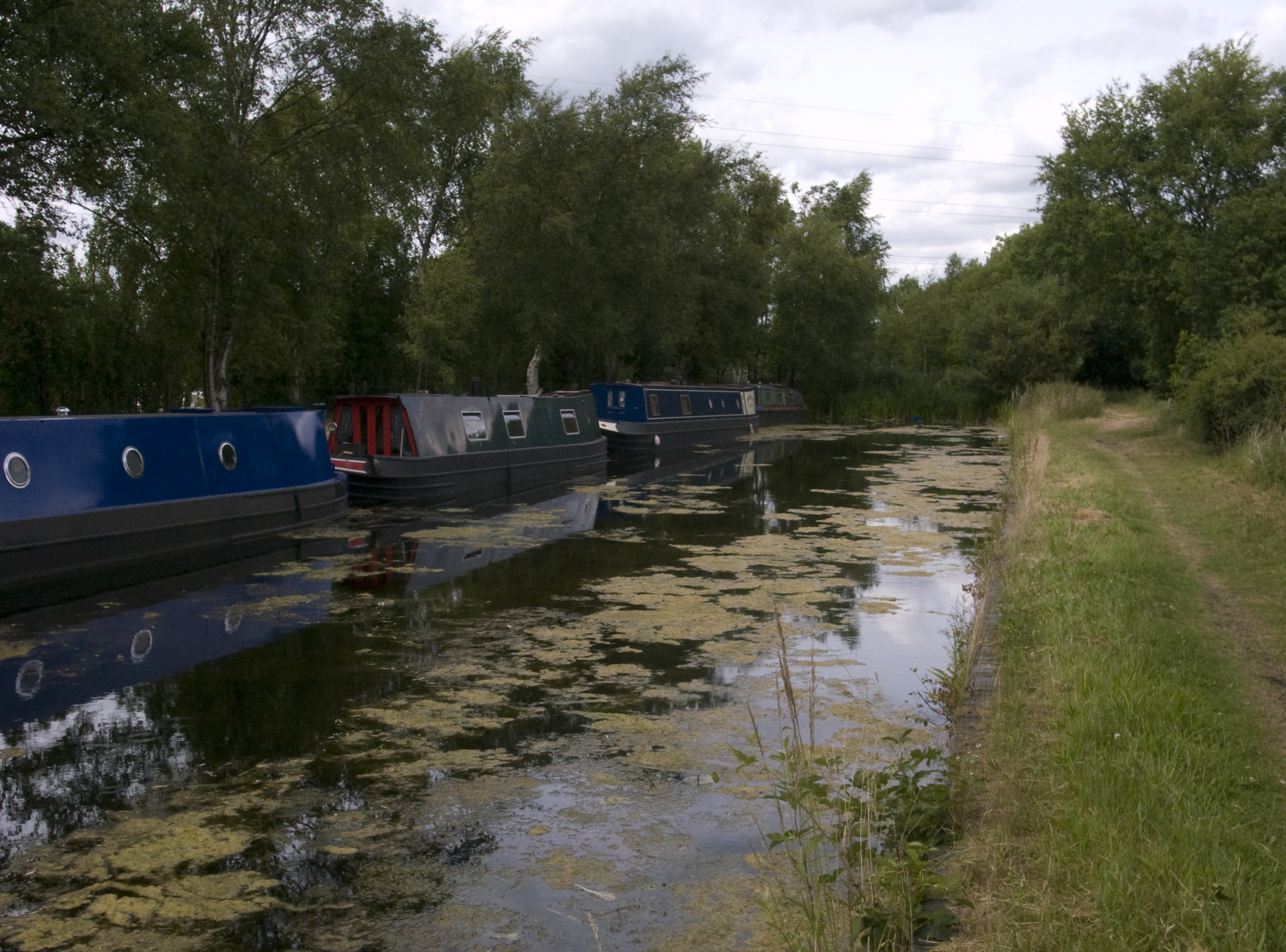
The northern terminus is now just to the south of the A5 road.

Pelsall Road Bridge carries the B4154 Lime Lane over the canal. A little further north on the east bank were the two basins which served Conduit Colliery. A tramway, which ran in a north-easterly direction, was built to connect the colliery to the basins. The next crossing is Watling Street, now the A5 road, and the modern canal ends here. Beyond, much of the canal was on high embankments, raised to combat subsidence, but traffic no longer justified the costs of maintenance, and the northerly section was closed in 1963. The next bridge was Northgreen Bridge, beyond which there was a wharf, and the first of several large brick overflow weirs. After New Road Bridge, located where the modern M6 Toll motorway crosses the course of the canal, and Foredrove Bridge, the junction with the Norton Springs Branch was marked by a large basin to the east of the canal.

The branch ran to another colliery called Conduit Colliery. By 1888 it ended where a railway siding crossed it course, part of the LNWR Fiveways Branch, which joined the North Staffordshire Line Norton Branch to the east of the basin. The Norton Branch railway crossed the canal branch immediately above the basin, and then crossed the main line of the canal. There was another basin after the bridge, and the canal turned to the west. The railway recrossed the canal after Hednesford Road Bridge. After Norton Common Bridge, Badger Bridge, and two more bridges which were unnamed in 1884, the route turned to the north-west, and there was a basin to the north of the canal, which served the Cannock and Leacroft Colliery. A railway line joined the two, which passed through a short tunnel to emerge by the basin. Immediately after the basin entrance, Washbrook Lane crossed at High Bridge, and then the thirteen locks of the Churchbridge Branch turned off at Rumer Hill Junction, descending in a straight line to the south west.

At Rumer Hill, a short spur was connected to a railway which ran to Mid Cannock Colliery, which was disused by 1888. The canal turned to the north, and its course lies under the modern A460 road. Three more bridges followed. The middle one was near the hamlet of Mill Green, and its site now lies beneath the roundabout where the A460 and the A5190 Lichfield Road meet. Another brick weir was located on the west bank, just before the start of a large embankment. The road to Hawk's Green passed through the embankment, at the site of the modern Hawk's Green roundabout. The London and North Western Railway Norton Extension Branch crossed at an angle, and there was one more bridge before the two basins at Hednesford. A siding from the Norton Extension Railway ran alongside the canal for this final stretch, to connect to what had once been the Littleworth Tramway, built for the opening of the canal, to serve collieries in the area, including the East Cannock Colliery, the Cannock Chase Colliery, and the Cannock and Wimblebury Colliery.

== Features ==
Point	Coordinates (Links to map resources)	OS Grid Ref	Notes
Hednesford Basin	52.6933°N 2.0044°W	SJ997106	lost - estimated from map
Churchbridge Junction	52.6721°N 2.0227°W	SJ984083	lost - estimated from map
Rumer Hill Junction	52.6784°N 2.0132°W	SJ991090	lost - estimated from map Also known as Rumour Hill Junction
Norton Springs Branch	52.6663°N 1.9712°W	SK019076	lost - estimated from map
M6 Toll bridge	52.6625°N 1.9714°W	SK019072	
A5 road (Watling Street)	52.66°N 1.9715°W	SK019069	
Norton Canes Docks	52.6595°N 1.9716°W	SK020071	
Mid-point	52.6486°N 1.9722°W	SK018056	of current in-water canal
Conduit Colliery basin	52.6567°N 1.9716°W	SK019065	old colliery basin
Lime Lane bridge	52.6541°N 1.9719°W	SK019063	B4154 road
Grove Basins	52.652°N 1.9722°W	SK018060	original Wyrley Grove Colliery wharf, now proposed junction for new Hatherton Canal link
Pelsall Junction	52.6377°N 1.9727°W	SK019043	Wyrley and Essington Canal

== See also ==
- Canals of the United Kingdom
- History of the British canal system

== Bibliography ==
- Dean, Richard (1989). Historical Map of the Birmingham Canals. M. & M. Baldwin. ISBN 978-0-947712-08-2.
- Hadfield, Charles (1985). Canals of the West Midlands. Newton Abbott: David & Charles. ISBN 978-0-7153-8644-6.
- Nicholson (2006). Nicholson Guides Vol 2: Severn, Avon and Birmingham. Harper Collins. ISBN 978-0-00-721110-4.
- Shill, Ray (2002). The Birmingham Canal Navigations. Tempus Publishing. ISBN 978-0-7524-2767-6.
- Ware, Michael E. (1989). Britain's Lost Waterways. Moorland Publishing. ISBN 978-0-86190-327-6.

=== References ===
- Jim Shead - Cannock Extension Canal
