= Little Norton, Staffordshire =

Place in Staffordshire, England

Coordinates: 52°40′04″N 1°57′45″W

Little Norton is an area of Norton Canes, Cannock Chase, Staffordshire, England. The area is located near Brownhills West and is also next to Chasewater Railway. The area is a residential area of Norton Canes. It is located next to the Norton Services and the M6 Toll Motorway. Bus No. 3 runs through the area between Norton Canes and Brownhills West.
