= North Lanes, Staffordshire =

Area of Norton Canes in the Cannock Chase District of Staffordshire, England

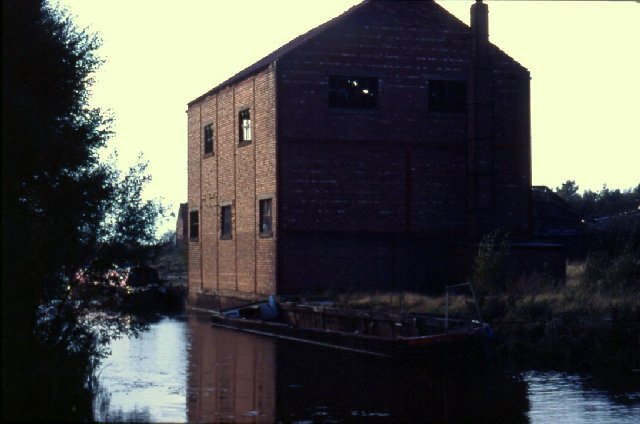
Canal side warehouse near Pelsall Road Bridge

North Lanes (Lime Lane) is an area of Norton Canes, in the Cannock Chase District of Staffordshire, England. The area is rural, and forms a large part of Norton Canes's greenbelt. It is the location of the former colliery from where a canal basin of the Cannock Extension Canal is located, and sits above multiple mineshafts. The name is historically Lime Lane but appears as North Lanes on modern maps. The area is mostly made up of winding roads, farmland and common land. The Cannock Extension Canal here is a Cannock Extension Canal due to the presence of Floating Water Plantain. As well as its proximity to Little Wyrley, Brownhills West and Norton Canes. There are two lots of service stations as well as a social club and industrial estates.

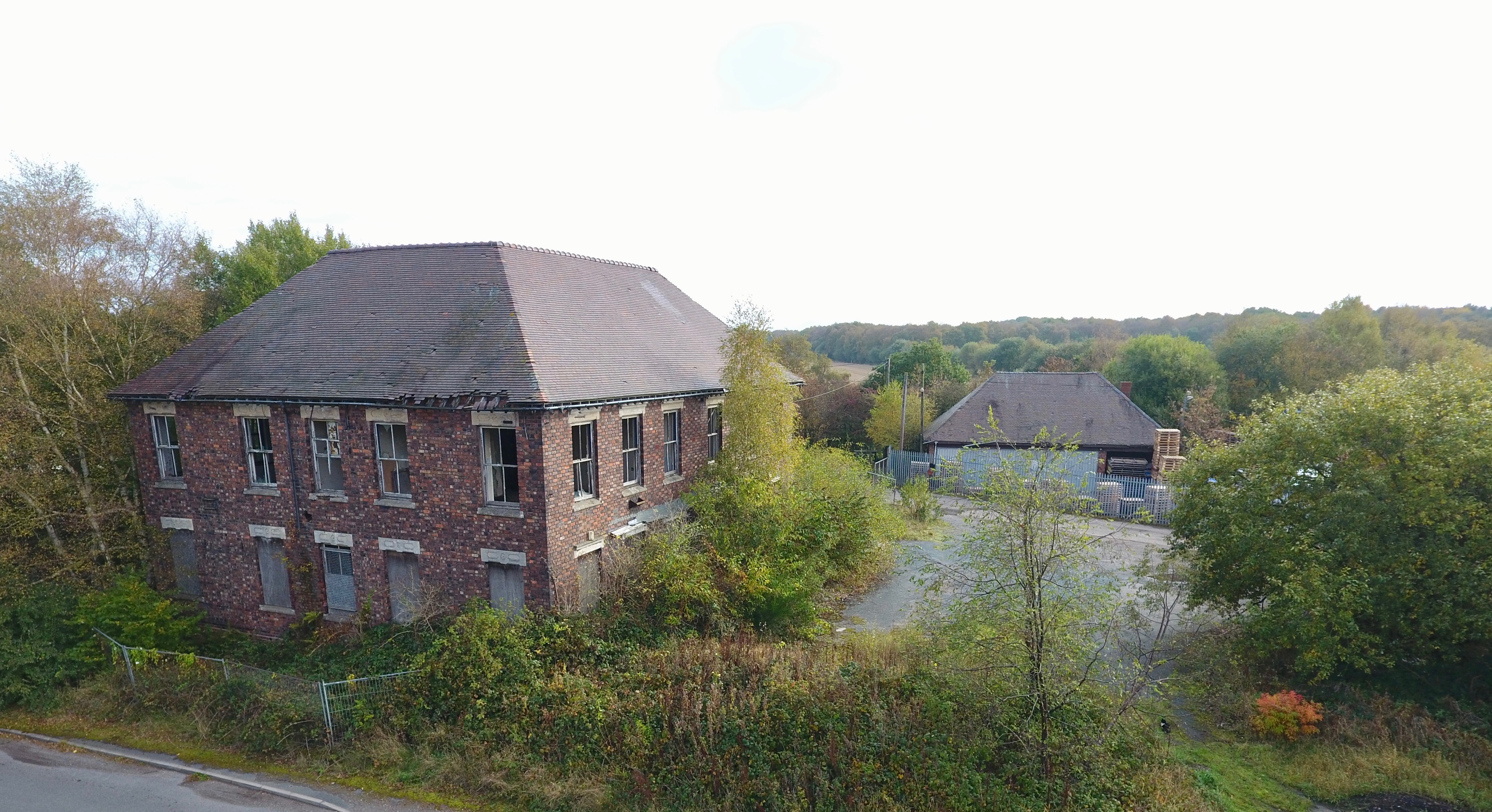
The site of Grove Colliery, North Lanes
