= Pelsall Junction =

Canal junction in England

Coordinates: 52°38′15″N 1°58′22″W

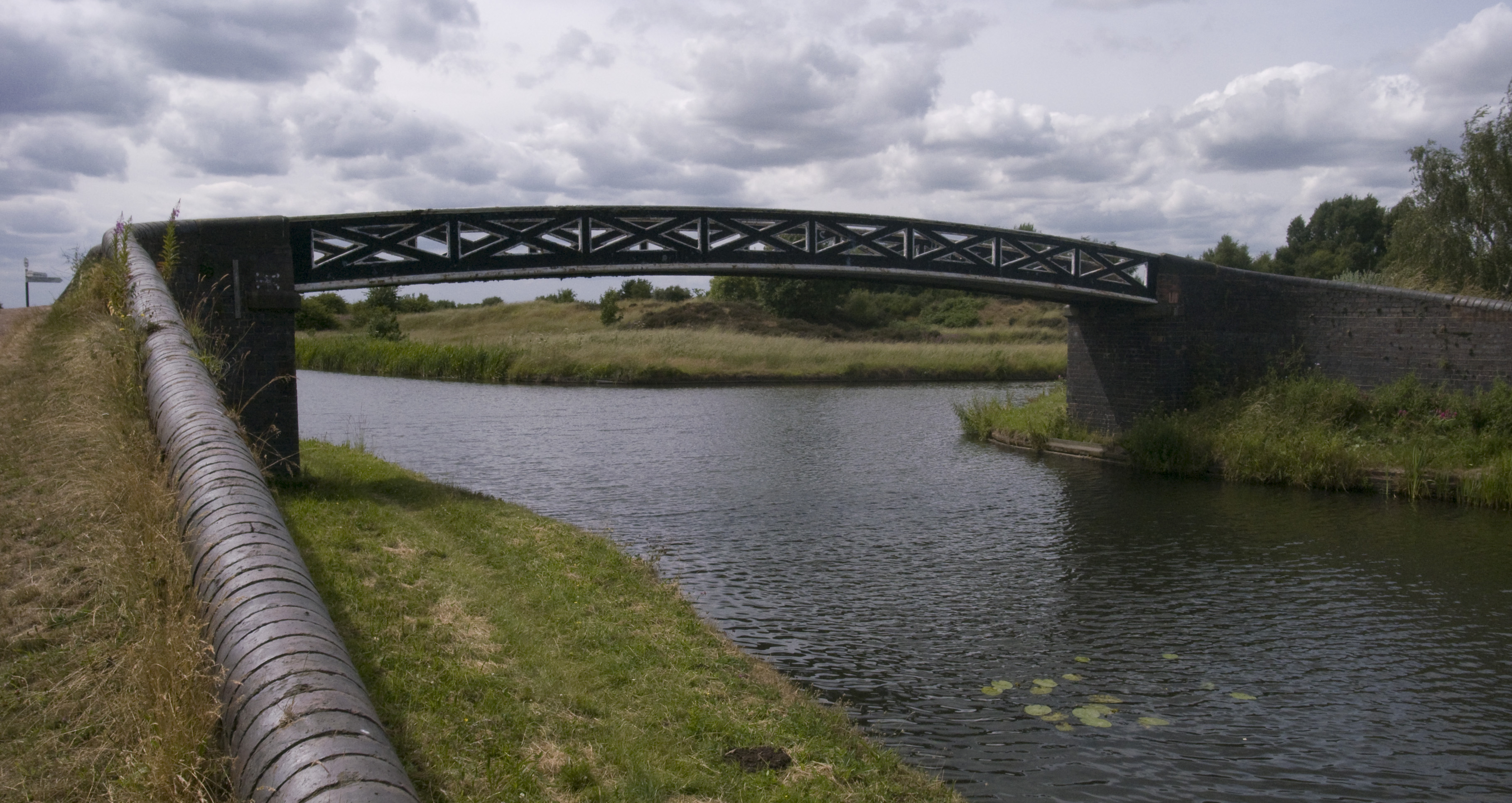
- Pelsall Junction with the Cannock Extension Canal commencing under the bridge to the right

Specifications
- Status: Open
- Navigation authority: British Waterways

History
- Date completed: 1863

Pelsall Junction (grid reference SK018044) is a canal junction at the southern limit of the Cannock Extension Canal where it meets the Wyrley and Essington Canal main line, near Pelsall, West Midlands, England.

== History ==
The Wyrley and Essington Canal passed through the site of Pelsall Junction as a result of a change of plan while the canal authorised by their first Act of Parliament was still being built. The original Act, obtained in 1792, was for a canal from collieries at Wyrley and Essington to Wolverhampton, where it would join the Birmingham Canal Navigations at Horseley Fields Junction. There was also to be a branch to serve Walsall, ending near to the present site of Birchills Junction. However, a second Act was obtained in 1794, which made the Walsall branch into the mainline and authorised its extension to the east, passing through Pelsall to reach Brownhills, where there were more coal mines, and then descending through thirty locks to the Coventry Canal at Huddlesford Junction. The new mainline was completed by May 1797, although there were initial problems with water supply, which were resolved in 1800 with the construction of a large reservoir at Chasewater.

Following the amalgamation of the Wyrley and Essington with the Birmingham Canal Navigations in 1840, a number of extensions to the system had been made, which had proved successful, and the Cannock Extension Canal was one of the second batches of extensions begun in 1854. It ran from the Hednesford coal fields to the Wyrley and Essington Canal at Pelsall Junction and was completed in 1863. When it opened, a branch with a flight of thirteen locks at Churchbridge linked it to the Hatherton Branch of the Staffordshire and Worcestershire Canal. The canal and hence the junction was an important commercial route until 1961, when the battle with subsidence caused by the mines it served was lost. The section north of Watling Street was abandoned in 1963, and the junction now serves a quiet backwater, with boatyards at the old Brownhills colliery basins and just to the south of Watling Street.

== Location ==
The Wyrley and Essington Canal runs east to west at the junction, with the towpath on the southern bank. To the east, the canal is level for 5 miles (8.0 km) to Anglesey Basin, on the edge of the Chasewater Reservoir. At Catshill Junction, the Daw End Branch of the Wyrley and Essington turns off, and if level for 5.3 miles (8.5 km) to Longwood Junction, which is 7.9 miles (12.7 km) from Pelsall Junction, and where the Rushall Canal starts. To the west, the canal is level to Horseley Fields Junction, 12.7 miles (20.4 km) away, and the BCN Main Line which it joins continues on the same level in both directions. The water level is 473 feet (144 m) above sea level, and this level is known as the Wolverhampton Level, to distinguish it from other parts of the Birmingham Canal Navigations which are at the Birmingham Level of 453 feet (138 m).

The Cannock extension canal has a towpath on the eastern bank, and is level for just 1.5 miles (2.4 km), beyond which it is filled in. A cast-iron bridge spans the eastern arm of the junction to connect the towpaths. It consists of two side-girders, each cast as a single piece, but with a latticework of saltire crosses in the ironwork. A walkway of iron plates joins the two side-girders, which rest on brick abutments. The bridge dates from the construction of the Extension Canal, and is a grade II listed structure.

== See also ==
- Canals of the United Kingdom
- History of the British canal system

== Bibliography ==
- Cumberlidge, Jane (2009). Inland Waterways of Great Britain (8th Ed.). Imray Laurie Norie and Wilson. ISBN 978-1-84623-010-3.
- Hadfield, Charles (1985). The Canals of the West Midlands. David and Charles. ISBN 0-7153-8644-1.
- Nicholson (2006). Nicholson Guide Vol 2 - Severn, Avon & Birmingham. Harper Collins. ISBN 978-0-00-721110-4.
- Pearson, Michael (1989). Canal Companion - Birmingham Canal Navigations. J. M. Pearson & Associates. ISBN 0-907864-49-X.
