= St James the Great Church, Norton Canes =

Parish church in Staffordshire, England

St. James the Great, Norton Canes
- Church of St. James the Great, Norton Canes
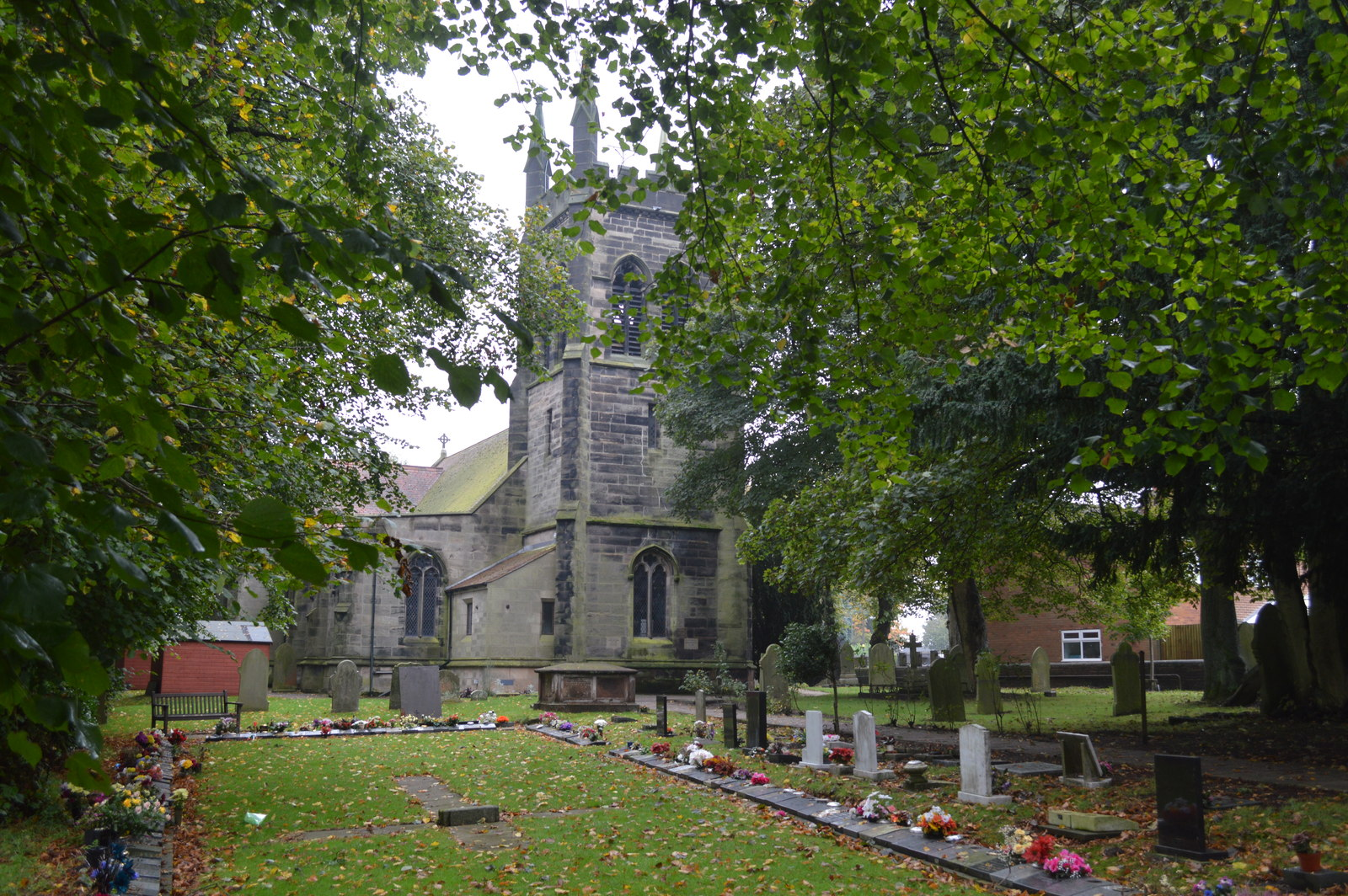
- St. James the Great Church, Norton Canes
- St. James the Great, Norton Canes
- 52.668302°N 1.987013°W
- OS grid reference: SK 00974 07843
- Location: Norton Canes, Cannock Chase District, Staffordshire
- Country: England
- Denomination: Church of England
- Churchmanship: Anglo-Catholic
- Website: www.achurchnearyou.com/church/4415/

History
- Status: Parish church
- Dedication: St James the Great

Architecture
- Functional status: Active
- Heritage designation: Grade II*
- Designated: June 1951

Administration
- Province: Canterbury
- Diocese: Lichfield
- Parish: Norton Canes

Clergy
- Bishop: The Rt Revd Paul Thomas (AEO)
- Rector: Fr Neil Hibbins

St James the Great Church is the parish church of Norton Canes in the Cannock Chase District of Staffordshire, England. It is located on Church Road, a short distance from the village centre.

== History ==
The first church was built on the site in 1832. Severely damaged by fire in 1888, the present building was constructed as a replacement. The construction material is local sandstone and the style is Perpendicular Gothic. The church was given Grade II* listed building status in 1951.

St James's remains an active parish church with regular services, and acts as a community hub. As the parish has passed resolutions rejecting the ordination of women, it receives alternative episcopal oversight from the Bishop of Oswestry (currently Paul Thomas).

== See also ==
- Arthur George Raymond Bristow (1909 - 2007), an Anglican priest who was the longest serving priest in the Church of England at the time of his death
