= St Michael & All Angels Church, Pelsall =

Anglican church in Walsall, West Midlands, England

St Michael & All Angels Church
- St Michael & All Angels Church, Pelsall
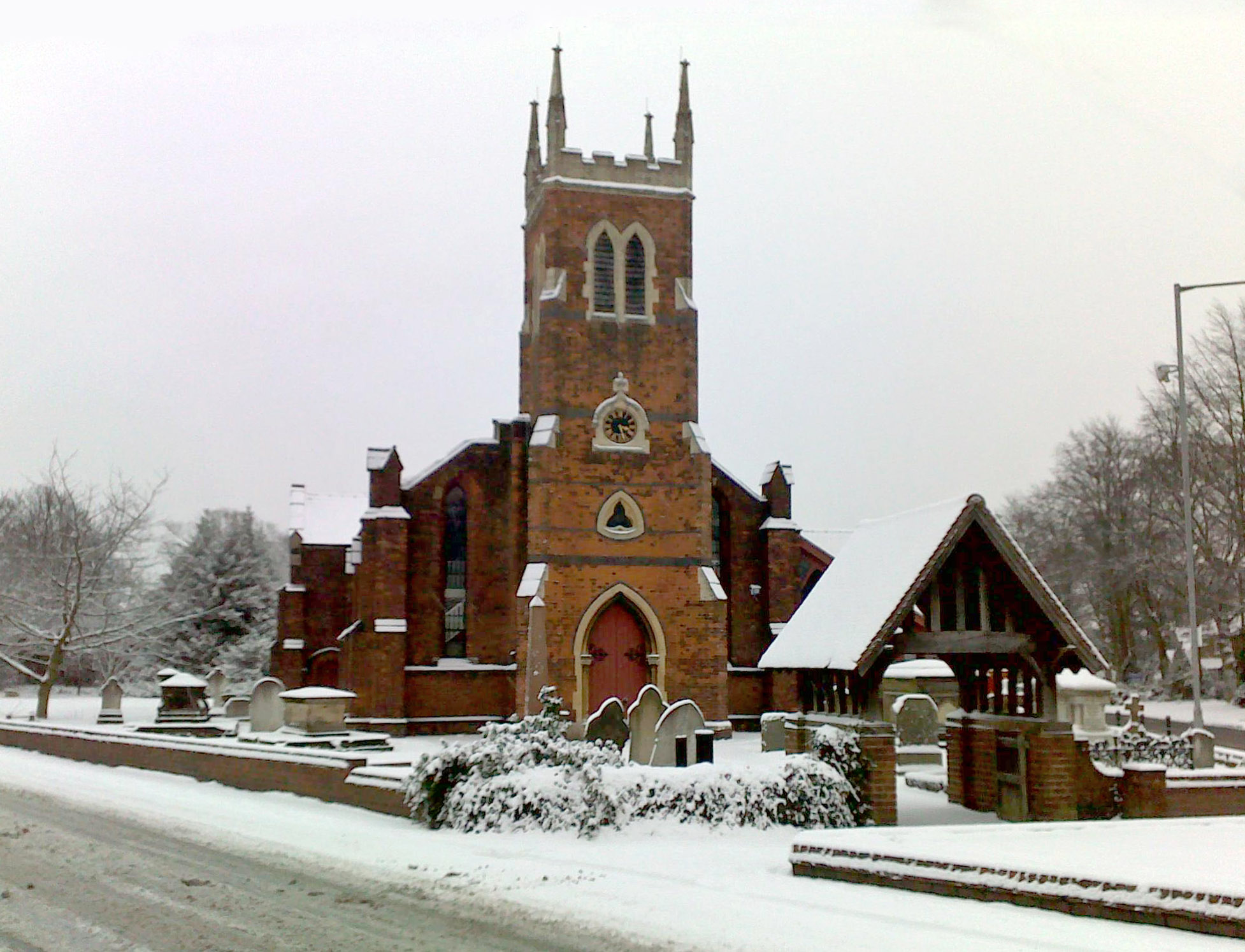
- St Michael & All Angels Church, Pelsall
- St Michael & All Angels Church
- 52.6254°N 1.9713°W
- Location: Pelsall, Walsall, West Midlands
- Country: England
- Denomination: Anglican
- Website: www.stmichaelspelsall.co.uk//

History
- Status: Parish church
- Dedication: St Michael and All Angels

Architecture
- Functional status: Active

Administration
- Province: Canterbury
- Diocese: Lichfield
- Archdeaconry: Walsall
- Parish: Walsall

St Michael & All Angels Church is an Anglican parish church in Pelsall, West Midlands, England. It was built in 1844 to replace an older church on Paradise Lane and was completed in 1889. The Deans of Wolverhampton were vicars until 1846 when the church came under the ecclesiastical district of Pelsall. The churchyard has a memorial to the 1872 Pelsall Hall Colliery disaster when 22 miners died when the pit was flooded by a sudden rush of water. The Bishop of Lichfield and the village paid tribute to the miners and had a memorial erected at St Michael and All Angels Churchyard. The church sits at the junction of Hall Lane and Church Road. It is within the "Pelsall Common" conservation area though it is not listed. The church hall is used by the local community.
