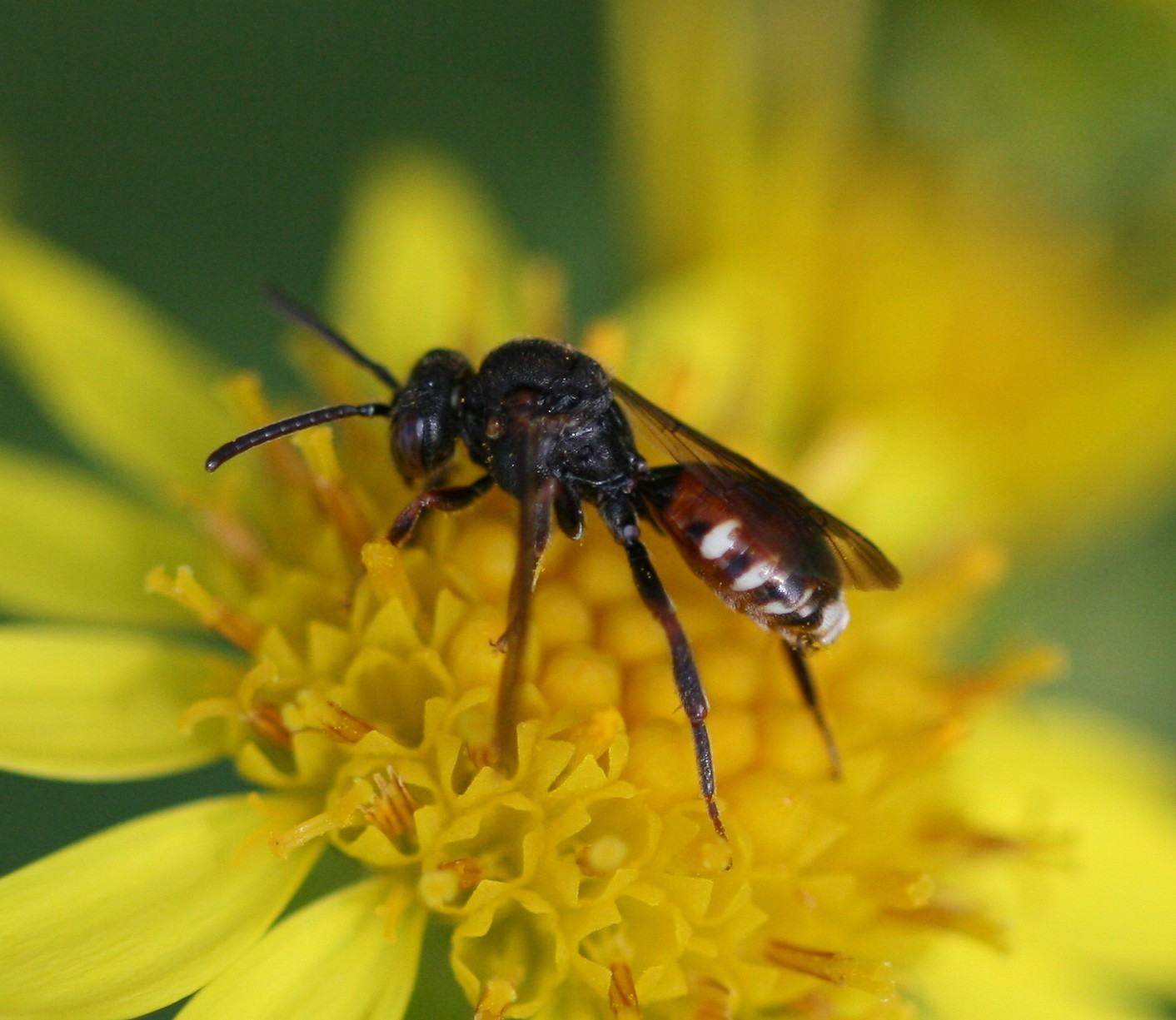
- Nomada obtusifrons Armet Forest, Gilston, Berwickshire, Scotland.

Scientific classification
- Kingdom: Animalia
- Phylum: Arthropoda
- Clade: Pancrustacea
- Class: Insecta
- Order: Hymenoptera
- Family: Apidae
- Subfamily: Nomadinae
- Tribe: Nomadini
- Genus: Nomada
- Species: N. obtusifrons

Binomial name
- Nomada obtusifrons Nylander, 1848

= Nomada obtusifrons =

Species of bee

Nomada obtusifrons is a Palearctic species of nomad bee. N. obtusifrons is a kleptoparasite that uses Andrena coitana as its host.
