= Jack Harrington (English footballer) =

English footballer (1896–1994)

Personal information
- Full name: John William Harrington
- Date of birth: 25 November 1896
- Place of birth: Norton Canes, England
- Date of death: 1994 (aged 97–98)
- Position: Winger

Senior career*
Years	Team	Apps	(Gls)
1922–1923	Hednesford Town		
1923–1928	Wolverhampton Wanderers	107	(10)
1928–1929	Northampton Town	8	(0)
1929	Brierley Hill Alliance		
Total		115	(10)
- * Club domestic league appearances and goals

John William Harrington (25 November 1896 – 1994) was an English footballer who played in the Football League for Northampton Town and Wolverhampton Wanderers.
