= Hatherton Canal =

Canal in Staffordshire, England

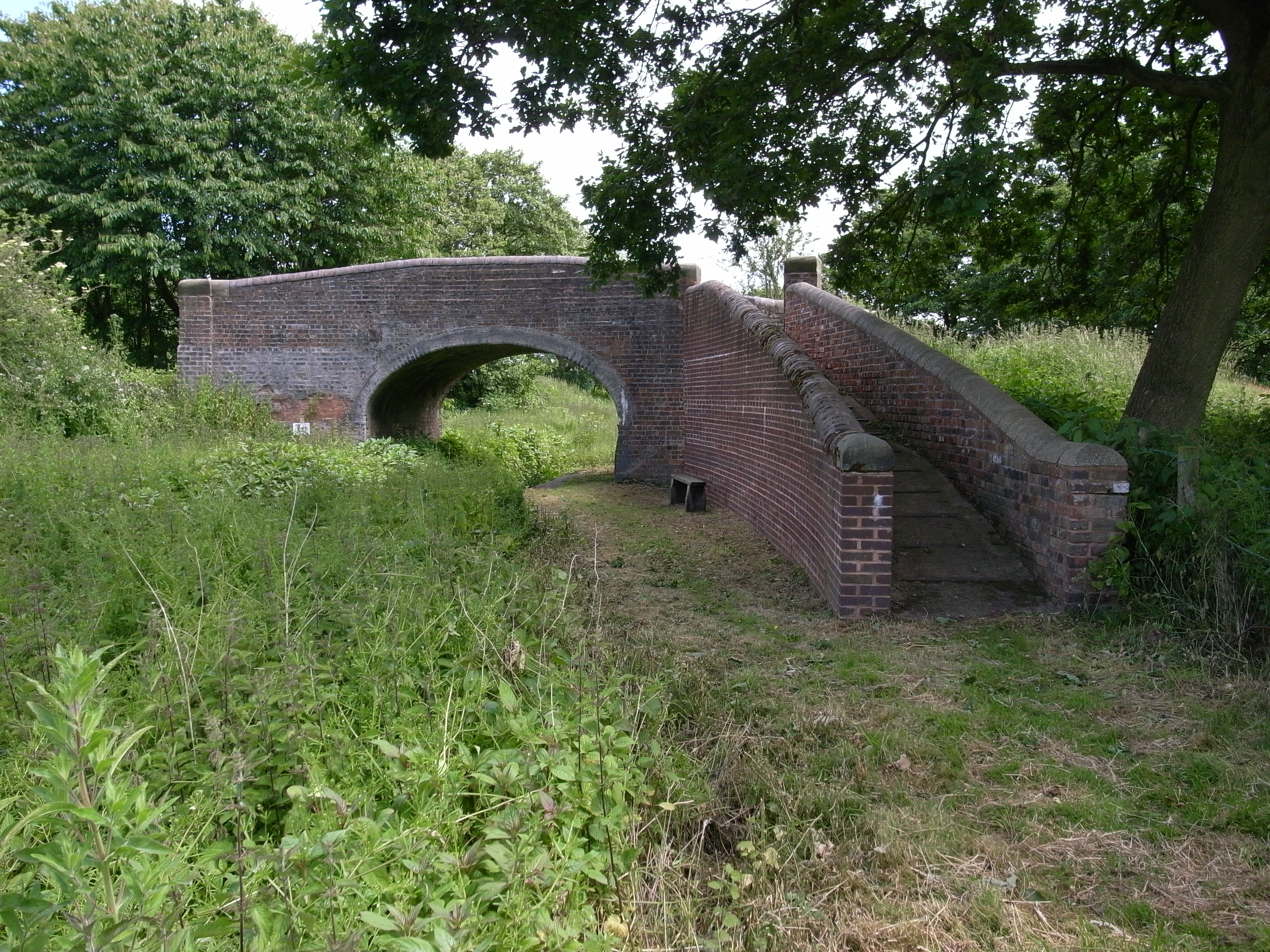
- Accommodation bridge accessed from the Roman Way Hotel, at eastern limit of public access
- Interactive map of Hatherton Canal

Specifications
- Locks: 21
- Status: part extant

History
- Date of first use: 1841
- Date completed: 1863
- Date closed: 1949

Geography
- Start point: Calf Heath
- End point: Churchbridge
- Connects to: Staffordshire and Worcestershire Canal, Cannock Extension Canal

The Hatherton Canal is a derelict branch of the Staffordshire and Worcestershire Canal in south Staffordshire, England. It was constructed in two phases, the first section opening in 1841 and connecting the main line to Churchbridge, from where a tramway connected to the Great Wyrley coal mines. The second section was a joint venture with the Birmingham Canal Navigations, and linked Churchbridge to the Cannock Extension Canal by a flight of 13 locks, which were opened with the Extension Canal in 1863. The coal traffic was very profitable, and the canal remained in use until 1949. It was formally abandoned in 1955, after which the Churchbridge flight and much of the Extension Canal were destroyed by open cast mining.

Plans for its restoration began in 1975 and the forerunner to the Lichfield and Hatherton Canals Restoration Trust was formed in 1989. Since then they have worked hard to protect and restore the canal, which was threatened by the route of the M6 Toll motorway. Negotiations eventually led to the provision of two culverts, one paid for by the Trust and the other by the road builders, which will be used in due course for the route of the re-aligned canal. In 2006, the engineers Arup produced a feasibility study for a replacement route for the destroyed section which would link to Grove Basin on the Cannock Extension Canal. Environmental concerns led to a second feasibility study being produced by Atkins in 2009, for a route which connected to the derelict Lord Hayes Branch on the Wyrley and Essington Canal. A short section near the junction with the Staffordshire and Worcestershire Canal is navigable, and the cost of restoring the rest and building the new route to the Wyrley and Essington was estimated at £44.1 million in 2009.

== History ==
The Hatherton Canal was built in two phases by two separate canal companies, over a period of some 20 years. The first part to be constructed ran from Hatherton Junction at Calf Heath on the Staffordshire and Worcestershire Canal to Churchbridge, and was built as a branch of the main canal by the Staffordshire and Worcestershire Canal Company. There had been proposals for a tramway following a similar route in 1798, to link to collieries owned by a Mr. Vernon near Wyrley. Plans for the tramway were borrowed by the canal company, and formed the basis for surveys in 1826 and 1830, but the branch as built followed a somewhat different route, and was surveyed in 1837. Unusually, an act of Parliament was not obtained for the work, and so all land required for the project had to be bought by agreement with the landowners. Negotiations were completed by 4 April 1839, at which point the company accepted an estimate of £12,345 from Robert Frost, and construction began. This phase was completed in April 1841, and a tramway from the terminus to Great Wyrley, which was used to transport coal, was completed the following year. Both the canal and the tramway were financed out of income, as the canal company was very profitable at the time, paying dividends to shareholders which had exceeded 25 per cent for over thirty years. The branch was called the Hatherton Branch after the company chairman, Lord Hatherton.

The branch was about 3.5 miles (5.6 km) long, and rose through eight locks. The second phase was a joint venture between the Staffordshire and Worcestershire Canal and the Birmingham Canal Navigations Company, who were at the time planning to build the Cannock Extension Canal, a branch of the Wyrley and Essington Canal which would serve coal mines in the vicinity of Cannock. An agreement was reached in 1854 to construct a flight of thirteen locks between the Hatherton Branch and the Cannock Extension Canal at Churchbridge. Although the cost of the land purchase was shared, the Staffordshire and Worcestershire Canal appear to have paid for the construction of the locks. They were built in 1858 and 1859, but were probably not used until 1863, when the Cannock Extension Canal was completed and opened. This section opened up a useful route along the northern edge of the Birmingham conurbation. The total length of the two branches was around 4 miles (6.4 km).

Traffic on the branch was considerable. Movements of coal down the Churchbridge flight were around 12,000 tons per month in 1902, while in 1905 the Staffordshire and Worcestershire Canal carried 722,000 tons, or which 225,000 tons were coal, mainly from the Cannock coalfields. Coal also contributed to the demise of the branch, as it was increasingly affected by subsidence from the mining in the 1940s. It ceased to be used by commercial traffic in August 1950 (with a single coal boat in February 1951), and was abandoned under the British Transport Commission Act 1955 (4 & 5 Eliz. 2. c. xxx). In the summer of 1952, a hire boat descended the canal, parts of which had been partly drained. Parts of it, including the Churchbridge flight of locks, were subsequently destroyed by opencast coal mining, and have since been re-developed.

After closure, the first half mile at the western end adjoining Hatherton Junction was bought by Ernie Thomas. This included the first lock, and Thomas used the pound above the lock to stable his fleet of hire boats. In the 1960s, he modified the second lock, making it around twice as wide at the top, so that it could be used as a dry dock. A boat would enter the lock, which would then be filled. The boat would then be moved sideways into the enlarged shallow section and the lock emptied, leaving the boat on dry ground where it could be overhauled. Once the work was complete, the lock would be refilled, the boat moved back over the deep section, and then floated out when the lock was emptied. This section of canal was subsequently taken over by Phil Jones, owner of the Hatherton Marina boatyard, who continued to use the second lock as a dry dock.

Water flows through the lock because the canal acts as a feeder for the Staffordshire and Worcestershire Canal. The gates were replaced in 1987, but by 2024, the lock was leaking badly, both through the gates and through the brickwork. Rothen Group were employed to repair the brickwork and to replace the lockgates and paddle gear. The upper gate was replaced by a steel gate, while they manufactured a new set of mitred gates for the bottom end. The gates were constructed of oak, and were the first set of wooden gates that the company had produced. The result was a success, and has significantly reduced the time it takes to fill the lock when dry docking is required.

== Restoration ==
The idea of restoring the canal was first developed in 1975, as a result of legislation requiring planning authorities to produce county structure plans. The West Midlands structure plan included the concept of the restored canal as a linear park, and included a bypass to avoid the section destroyed by opencast mining. Further threats to the route from the proposed Birmingham Northern Relief Road led to the formation of the Ogley and Hatherton Restoration Society in 1989, after the Inland Waterways Association held a rally at Pelsall to highlight the plight of the canal. The Society later became the Lichfield and Hatherton Canals Restoration Trust, while the relief road became the M6 Toll motorway.

In 1995, motorway development again threatened the route, when plans for the proposed widening of the M6 motorway made no provision for the canal where the two crossed. The Trust had produced several papers which had been submitted to the planning enquiry for the road. The Trust continued to negotiate with the agencies involved in the construction of the M6 Toll motorway, even though the cost of providing navigable culverts was likely to be between £2M and £3M, but when agreement was finally reached, the Trust raised £150,000 to pay for a culvert under the A5/A34 roundabout, and the main culvert under the motorway was funded by the government.

The canal is now part of an active restoration project. As a result of a feasibility study, carried out between 2004 and 2006 by the consulting engineers Arup at the request of British Waterways, the proposed new route for the Churchbridge bypass would have run through new locks to a new junction at Grove Basin on the Cannock Extension Canal. However, this route proved to be unacceptable for a number of reasons, including the fact that the Cannock Extension Canal is a designated Special Area of Conservation, because it is colonised by a rare variety of floating water plantain. A second feasibility study, completed by Atkins in 2009, has now identified a route which would join the Wyrley and Essington Canal via the former Lord Hayes Branch instead. This route would help satisfy environmental concerns, be preferable to local landowners, and reduce the number of new road bridges needed.

Atkins estimated that the cost of rebuilding the canal, including construction of the new section to Lord Hayes Branch, would be £44.1 million. Although the route is slightly longer than that to Grove Basin, the cost was £4.6 million less, as the Grove Basin route involved a long cutting through land contaminated by spoil from Wyrley No.3 Colliery. Both of the proposed routes incorporate the new culverts under the A5 road and the M6 Toll motorway.

== Route ==
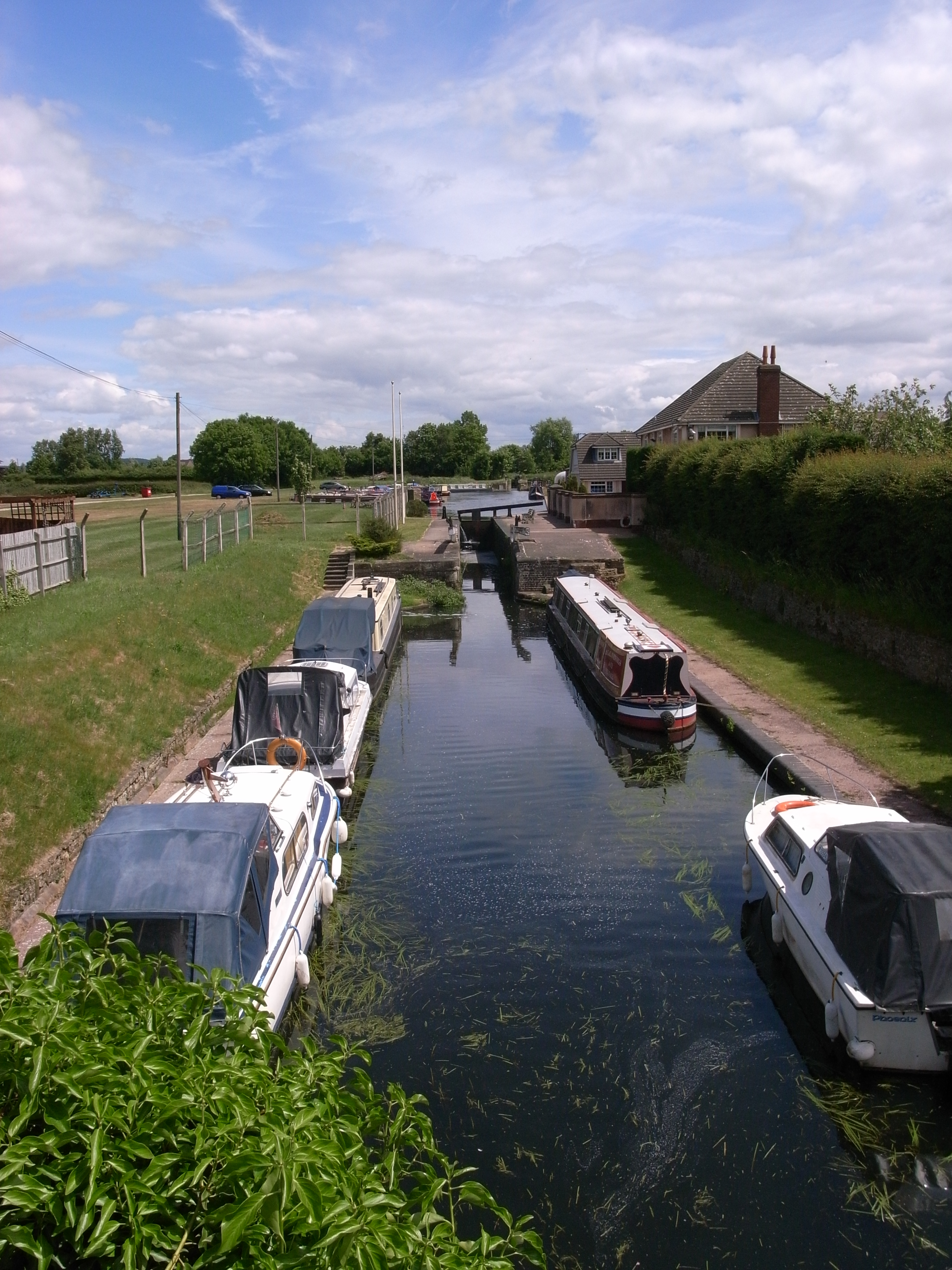
Marina and Locks 1 and 2 at Calf Heath

The canal leaves the main line of the Staffordshire and Worcestershire Canal at Calf Heath. There is a large marina on its north side, close to the junction, after which a bridge carries a minor road over the canal, before it enters the first lock. Above the lock, a wider section provides additional mooring space before the second lock. This has been modified to include a ledge to one side, which provides dry dock facilities for the nearby boatyard. Exit from the top of the lock by boat is not possible.

Beyond the lock, there is a section which could be dredged to return it to navigable condition, but the M6 motorway has been built across it. A culvert maintains the flow of water under the motorway, but is not big enough for navigation. However, the motorway embankment is high enough to allow the insertion of a navigable culvert. Just before the motorway was Dog Bridge, but this was demolished and the road it carried was realigned as part of the motorway construction. One possible solution would be to build a new lock beyond the road, to replace lock 2, and lower the level of the canal between. Beyond the motorway, Scrawpers End Bridge carries Oak Lane over the canal, but it has been lowered, leaving around 4 feet (1.2 m) of headroom. A replacement lift bridge might be required here. Next is the feeder from Gailey reservoirs, which has ensured that the channel has remained intact, since the water supplies the main line.

Saredon Mill bridge is in good condition, after Trust volunteers rebuilt the parapets. Considerable work has been done beyond it to remove trees and reinstate the towpath, creating a useful walking route. Cross bridge has again been lowered, but carries sufficient traffic that a lift bridge is not an option. The channel is in water, and is almost navigable here. Cats Bridge was replaced by a culvert, after it suffered from subsidence. An accommodation bridge beyond it was demolished by the Trust, as it had cracked and sunk as a result of subsidence. It is unlikely to be replaced, since it no longer served a useful purpose.

A weir on Saredon Brook supplies more water to the channel before it enters Meadow Lock, the structure of which is largely intact, although it suffered from subsidence before the canal closed. Trust volunteers have cleared the towpath above the lock, enabling walkers to reach a bridge located behind the Roman Way Hotel. Considerable work has been carried out on constructing an access ramp to the towpath and restoring the bridge, which often forms the backdrop to wedding photographs taken in the hotel grounds. Just beyond the bridge, another stream supplies water, but the canal bed is no longer owned by British Waterways after that point, and has been filled in.

The A4601 crosses at Wedge Mills Bridge, but the original bridge and the lock were destroyed when the road was widened. Joveys Lock was quite shallow, and has been re-used as a course for the Wyrley Brook, which was diverted to accommodate a sewage works. The location of the next two locks, Rosemary's and Walkmill, which were also known as Bridgtown No. 2 and Bridgtown Top, now lies beneath an industrial estate. Great Wyrley Basin was located here, as was Hawkins Basin, which was connected to the canal be a channel which was crossed by a towpath bridge and a lift bridge, before it crossed the Wyrley Brook on an aqueduct to reach the 2-acre (0.81 ha) basin. The aqueduct was uncovered during the construction of the M6 Toll motorway, and was destroyed as part of that project. Reinstatement of the canal through this section will not be possible, and so a new route to the south of the original line is proposed, which has been protected by being included in the Local Plans of South Staffordshire and Cannock Chase District Councils.

The land surface where the Churchbridge locks were located was stripped away by open cast mining in the 1950s, and the route of the canal has been obliterated. Staffordshire County Council owns some land between the A5 road and the M6 Toll motorway, which has been identified as a suitable route for a new section of canal.

=== Proposed new route ===
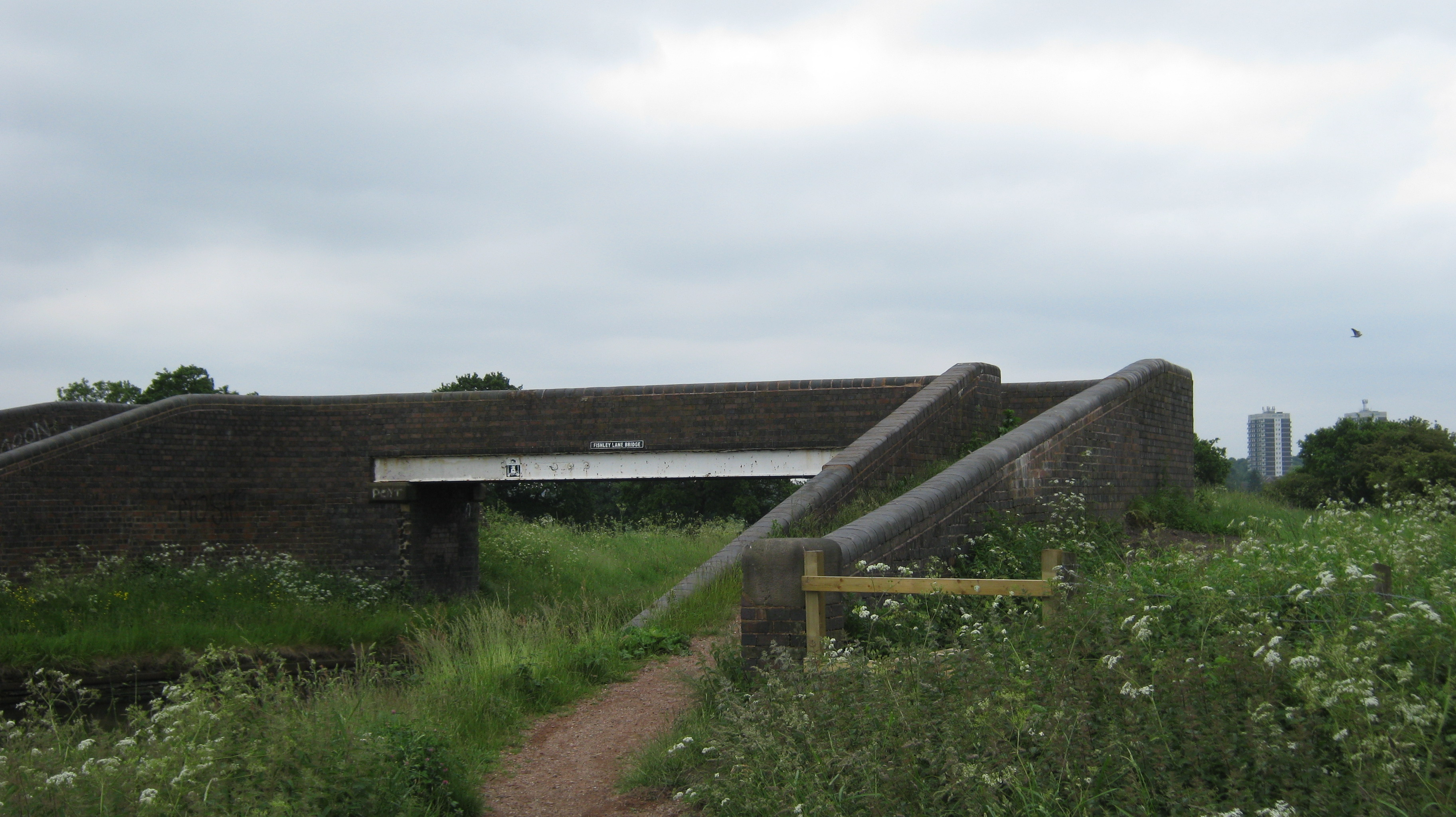
Fishley Lane Bridge on the Lord Hayes Branch, through which the new route will pass

From Churchbridge, the proposed new route follows the line of the A5, on County Council land, before turning to the south near the location of the northbound tollbooths on the motorway. It then follows the valley of the Wash Brook for around 1.9 miles (3.1 km), before a 1,000-yard (900 m) section which climbs to join the infilled Lord Hayes Branch about 330 yards (300 m) from its junction with the Wyrley and Essington Canal. This final section of the Lord Hayes Branch will be refurbished.

Most of the locks on the route have a drop of 9.2 feet (2.8 m). After Holford Lock and Gains Lock, the route turns to the east where a farm track will cross on a lift bridge. The route then passes along the north and east edge of a spoil tip associated with the Wyrley No. 3 Colliery, and crosses over the Wash Brook, which will be culverted at this point. Following discussions with landowners, the canal will be located in a 10-foot (3.0 m) deep cutting to cross fields. Further on, embankments have been sized so that the excavated spoil can be used, without having to remove spoil from the site. A fixed bridge will then carry an access track over the alignment, after which the canal passes under Gains Lane. This will require the road surface to be raised by about 7 feet (2.1 m) to provide navigable headroom of 8 feet (2.4 m) below the bridge structure. The canal then crosses Wash Brook, which will be regraded for about 66 yards (60 m), to ensure a suitably-sized culvert can be constructed. Atkins have identified this section as the most critical, because of the proximity of the road and the brook.

A public footpath between Gains Lane and Cadman's Lane crosses the route, and this will be partially re-routed along the towpath. A farm track then crosses a culvert, both of which will be altered to allow the culvert to pass under the canal without using an inverted syphon. A public footpath called Cadman's Lane will be diverted to cross the canal at the next lock. Three locks follow, called Dark Lane, Pylon and Cadman's. Pylon Lock is so named because it is located close to a large electricity pylon. At Cadman's Lock a farm track will be routed over the tail of the lock, and an adjacent ditch will be routed under the canal at the top end of the lock, to maintain the water levels. The canal then crosses Cadman's Lane again, which will be diverted for some distance along the towpath, mitigating the problems caused by the fact that the lane is often flooded by the Wash Brook, and becomes impassable. Wash Brook Lock will include a bridge over its tail to allow Cadman's Lane to rejoin its original route. Beyond the lock, the canal will be built on an embankment, some 16 feet (5 m) high in places.

The final section includes Golfers Lock, close to the Fishley Park Golf Range, and Colliery Lock, close to some shafts associated with the defunct Fishley Colliery. It then curves to join the Lord Hayes Branch to its junction with the Wyrley and Essington. Fishley Lane bridge crosses it, and could be refurbished, while the towpath is on the far side of the Wyrley and Essington, but the roving bridge which served the Lord Hayes Branch still exists. While the towpath will normally be 10 feet (3 m) wide, Atkins have suggested that it should be 13 feet (4 m) wide in some places, and suitably constructed to provide access for 5-tonne crawler cranes, which have revolutionalised the replacement of lock gates where such access has been provided on the Shropshire Union Canal.

== Points of Interest ==
=== Historical Route ===
Point	Coordinates (Links to map resources)	OS Grid Ref	Notes
Hatherton Junction	52.6743°N 2.0981°W	SJ933085	Staffordshire and Worcestershire Canal
Lock 1	52.6750°N 2.0963°W	SJ934086	
Lock 2	52.6754°N 2.0940°W	SJ936086	Dry dock, limit of navigation
Dog Bridge 1	52.6769°N 2.0895°W	SJ939088	Straight Mile. Culverted
M6 motorway bridge	52.6773°N 2.0881°W	SJ940088	Culverted
Scrawpers End Bridge 2	52.6786°N 2.0843°W	SJ943090	Oak Lane. Lowered
Saredon Mill Bridge 3	52.6781°N 2.0798°W	SJ946089	Accommodation bridge
Cross Bridge 4	52.6793°N 2.0745°W	SJ949091	Four Crosses Lane. Lowered
Cats Bridge 5	52.6798°N 2.0682°W	SJ953091	Catsbridge Lane. Culverted
Lock 3 (Meadow Lock)	52.6792°N 2.0609°W	SJ958090	
Bridge 7	52.6788°N 2.0540°W	SJ963090	Accommodation bridge
Limit of open waterway	52.6786°N 2.0523°W	SJ964090	
A4601 Wedges Mills bridge	52.6783°N 2.0498°W	SJ966089	Wolverhampton Road. Locks 4 & 5 before next bridge
Walkmill Lane Bridge	52.6723°N 2.0355°W	SJ975083	
Alongside M6 Toll	52.6718°N 2.0293°W	SJ980082	Locks 6, 7, 8 before next junction
Churchbridge Junction	52.6721°N 2.0227°W	SJ984083	End of Hatherton Canal. Position estimated from map
Rumer Hill Junction	52.6784°N 2.0132°W	SJ991090	End of Churchbridge Branch. Position estimated from map

=== New route ===
Point	Coordinates (Links to map resources)	OS Grid Ref	Notes
Grove Basin	52.652°N 1.9722°W	SK018060	First suggested terminus on Cannock Extension Canal
Gains Lock	52.6623°N 2.0017°W	SJ999071	
Dark Lane Lock	52.6517°N 1.9954°W	SK004060	
Pylon Lock	52.6499°N 1.9968°W	SK003058	
Cadman's Lock	52.6474°N 1.9961°W	SK003055	
Wash Brook Lock	52.6444°N 1.9920°W	SK006051	
Golfer's Lock	52.6419°N 1.9903°W	SK007049	
Colliery Lock	52.6386°N 1.9916°W	SK006045	
Fishley Lane Bridge	52.6366°N 1.9911°W	SK006043	
Lords Hayes Branch	52.6361°N 1.9887°W	SK007043	Jn with Wyrley and Essington Canal

== See also ==
- Canals of Great Britain
- History of the British canal system

== Bibliography ==
- Atkins (February 2009). Hatherton Canal Restoration Supplementary Feasibility Report (PDF). Lichfield and Hatherton Canals Restoration Trust. Archived (PDF) from the original on 10 July 2017.
- Dean, Richard (1989). Historical Map of the Birmingham Canals. M. & M. Baldwin. ISBN 978-0-947712-08-2.
- Hadfield, Charles (1985). The Canals of the West Midlands. David and Charles. ISBN 978-0-7153-8644-6.
- LHCRT (2009). A tale of two canals. Lichfield and Hatherton Canals Restoration Trust.
- Nicholson (2003). Nicholson Waterways Guide, Vol 3: Birmingham and the Heart of England. Harper Collins. ISBN 978-0-00-713666-7.
- Squires, Roger (2008). Britain's Restored Canals. Landmark Publishing. ISBN 978-1-84306-331-5.
