= Norton Canes =

Village in Staffordshire, England

Coordinates: 52°40′10″N 1°58′49″W

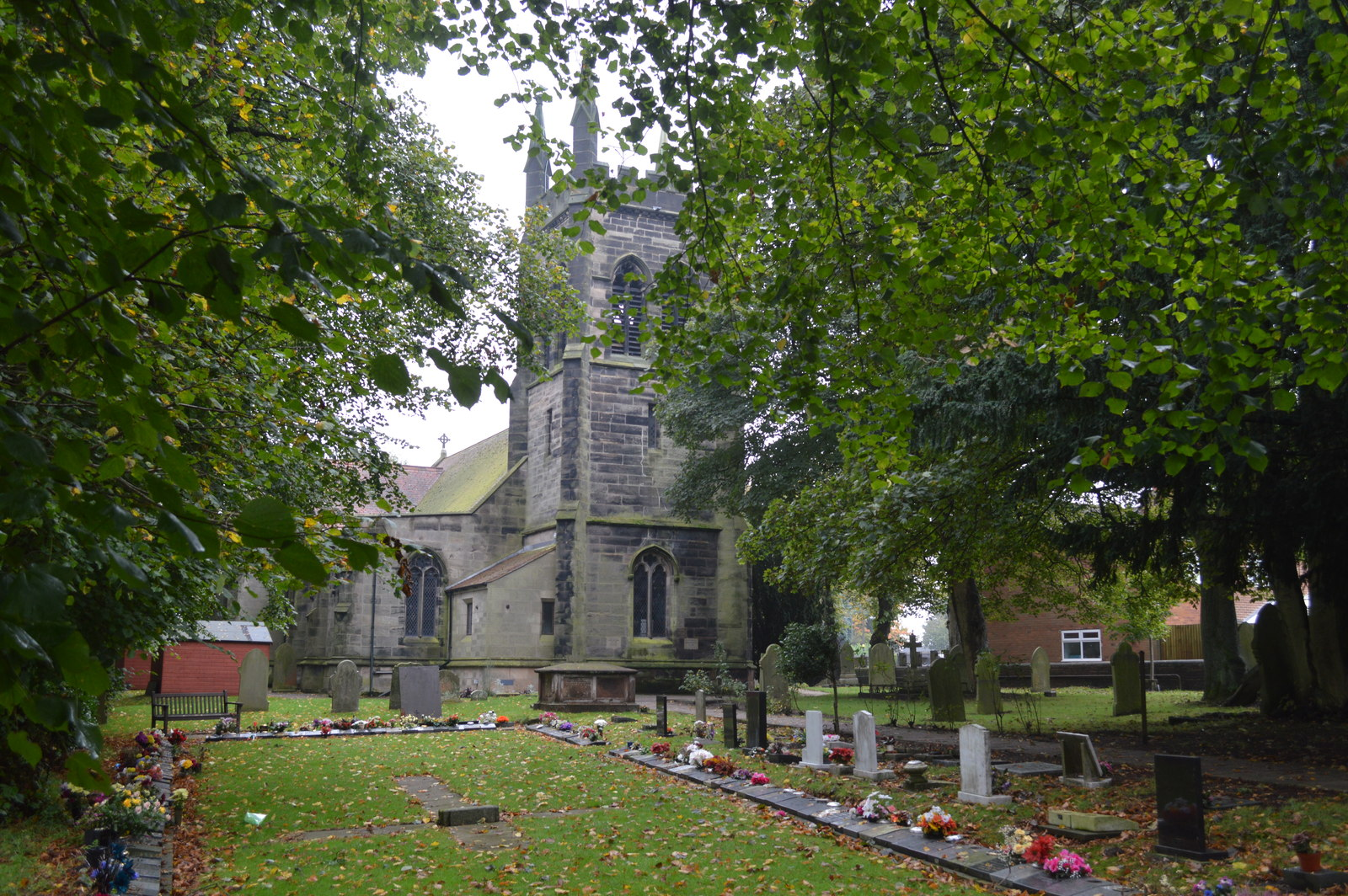
- St James the Great Church, Norton Canes

- Location within Staffordshire
- Population: 7,479 (2011)
- OS grid reference: SK010079
- Civil parish: Norton Canes
- District: Cannock Chase
- Shire county: Staffordshire
- Region: West Midlands
- Country: England
- Sovereign state: United Kingdom
- Post town: CANNOCK
- Postcode district: WS11
- Dialling code: 01543
- Police: Staffordshire
- Fire: Staffordshire
- Ambulance: West Midlands
- UK Parliament: Cannock Chase

Norton Canes is a village and civil parish in the Cannock Chase District, in Staffordshire, England. It lies close to the borders of the Lichfield, South Staffordshire and Walsall districts.

It is situated 3 miles (4.8 km) from Cannock. At the 2001 census, it had a population of 6,394, and an area of 3,746 acres (15.16 km^{2}), of which 86% is green open space. The population had increased to 7,470 at the 2011 census. Areas of the village include Little Norton, Little Wyrley, and North Lanes (Lime Lane).

The Cannock Chase Coalfield once had 45 collieries within 2 miles (3.2 km) of Norton Canes, employing over 5,800 men, as well as 2 large surface mines; the last pit in the area closed in 1993.

Grove Pit was one of these pits, and on 1 October 1930 was the scene of a major tragedy when 14 miners were killed in an explosion there.

Another local colliery was owned by the Jerome family, hence Jerome Road now on the site of the pit. This was the family of the author Jerome K. Jerome.

Norton Canes borders Chasewater – a collection of man-made lakes formed through old mining pits and a reservoir that feeds the canal system of the West Midlands. Chasewater is a popular leisure destination offering facilities for water-skiing and yachting, mountain biking, jogging, walking and bird watching.

Norton Canes straddles the UK's first and only toll motorway, the M6 Toll, and is the site of its northbound ("Great Wyrley") toll plaza and Norton Canes Services, which is the only services for that motorway.

== Facilities ==
The Orbital Retail Park is located on the outskirts of Norton Canes and houses many stores including furniture and food stores. Adjacent to the retail park are two hotels (Premier Inn and Holiday Inn, with the latter being in the 'Orbital Plaza' - an intriguing building similar to the Gherkin in London which can be seen for miles and, for many, is a sign they have arrived at The Orbital).

== Schools ==
There are two primary schools in Norton Canes: Jerome Primary School and Norton Canes Primary Academy. There is one high school: Norton Canes High School.

The Jerome Primary School was named to reflect the association with the Jerome family, who owned the pit referred to above.

== Public Transport ==
Norton Canes has never been served by a railway station, with the nearest being Cannock, but there were mineral and colliery lines which served Norton Junction – a major junction for traffic to and from Aldridge, Walsall Wood, Hednesford, Chasewater and Wolverhampton via Cannock. The junction closed to all traffic in the 1980s. The site is now a public park; all the lines have given way to houses and roads. Only a slight remnant of the former Pelsall – Norton Junction line remains as a public right of way between the former Ryders Crossing and the M6 pedestrian overpass.

Norton Canes is served by Chaserider bus service 3 (Cannock - Brownhills) and 60 (Cannock - Lichfield). These buses were previously operated by Arriva Midlands prior to the Cannock depot sale to D&G, owners of the Chaserider brand. Currently there are no Sunday or Bank Holiday buses.

== Notable residents ==
- Jack Harrington (1896–1994), footballer who played 107 games for Wolves between 1923 & 1928
- James Adams (1908 in Norton Canes – 1983) footballer who played 103 games for West Bromwich Albion F.C.
- Paul Dadge (born 1976), pictured iconically during the 7 July 2005 London bombings assisting a casualty.
- Ryan Woods (born Norton Canes 1993), Championship footballer, has played over 430 games
