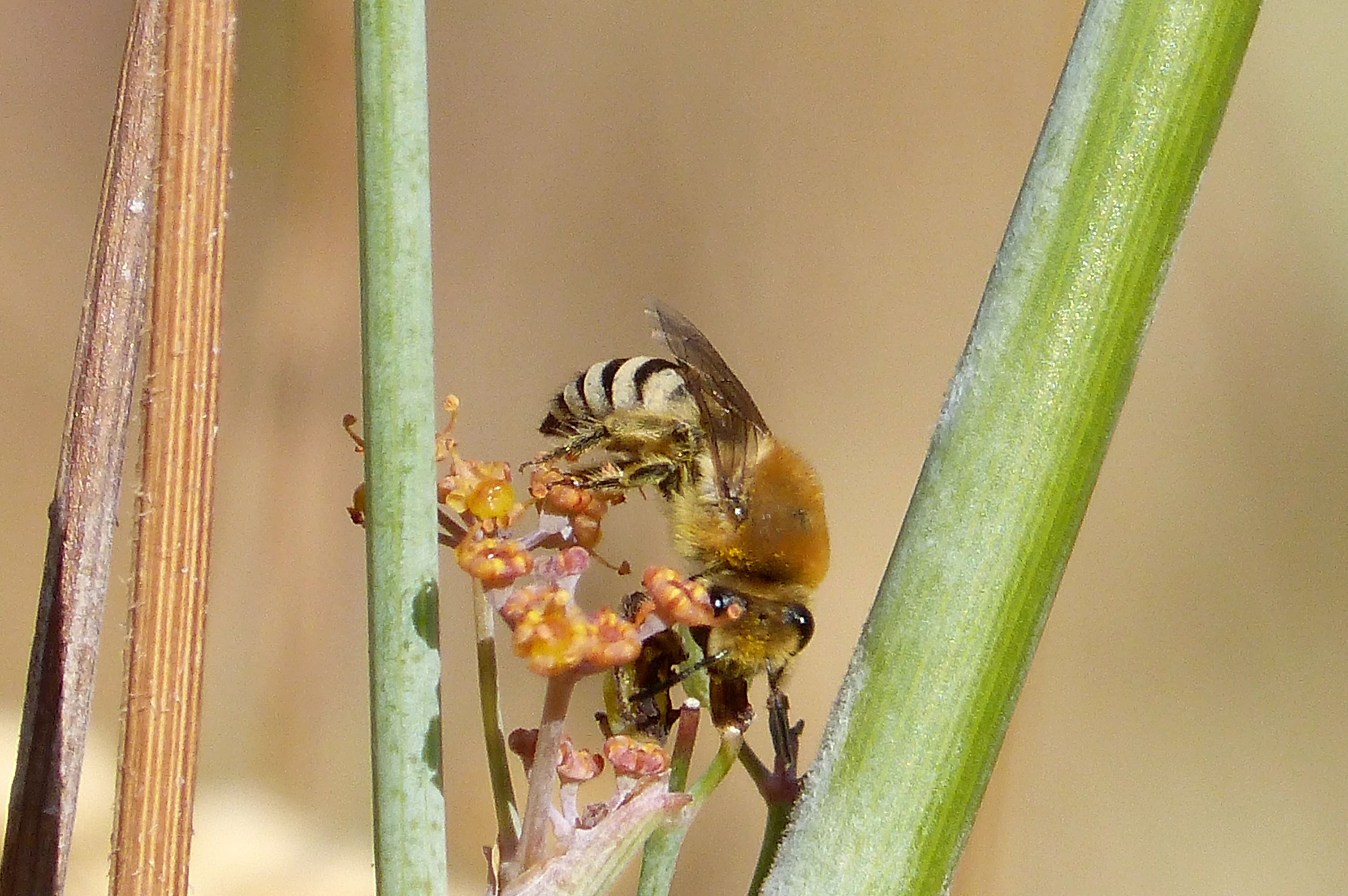
- C. abeillei from Spain
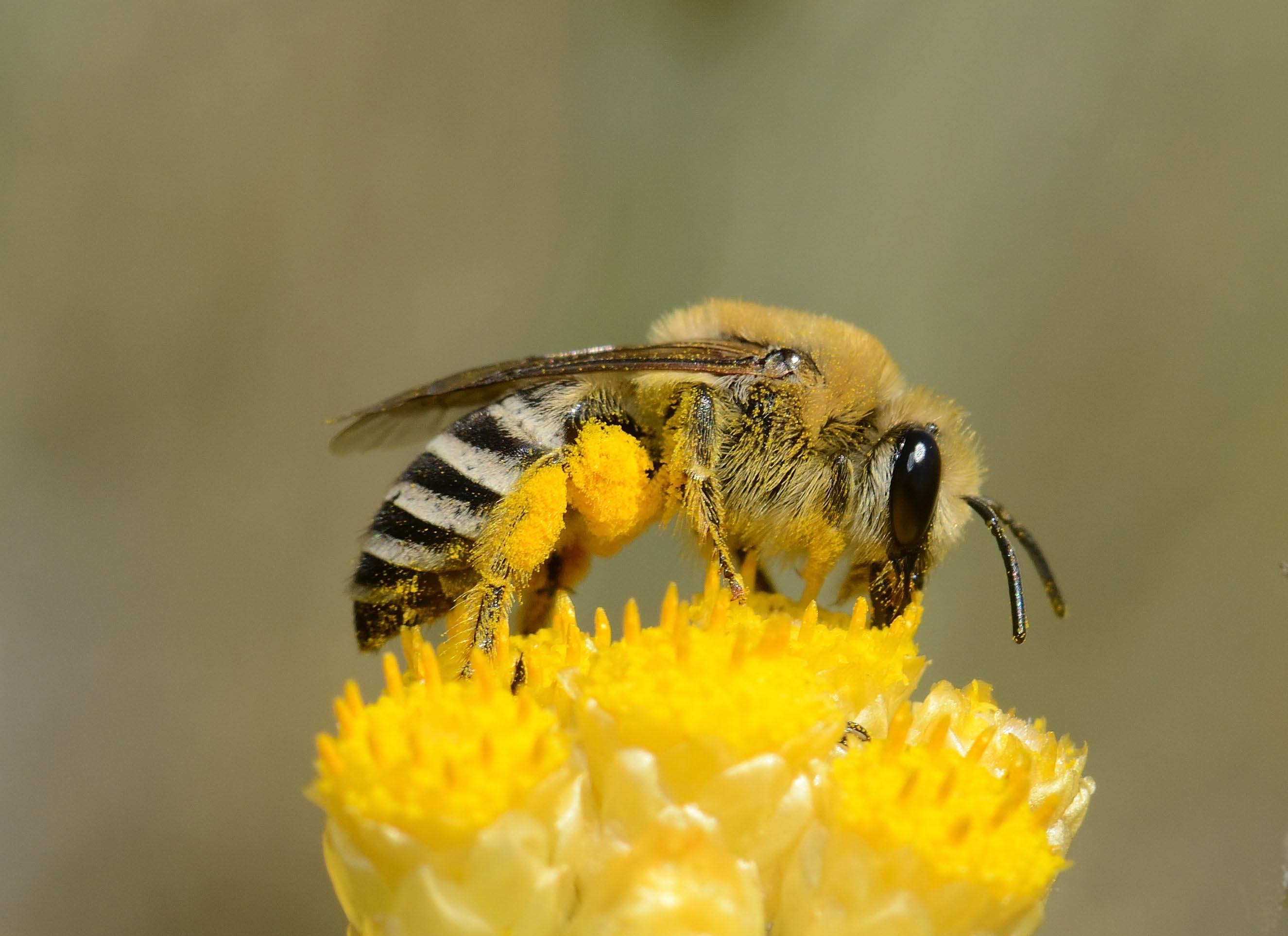
- Colletes abeillei from France

Conservation status
- Least Concern (IUCN 3.1)

Scientific classification
- Kingdom: Animalia
- Phylum: Arthropoda
- Class: Insecta
- Order: Hymenoptera
- Family: Colletidae
- Genus: Colletes
- Species: C. abeillei

Binomial name
- Colletes abeillei Pérez, 1903
- Map of the western Mediterranean region where C. abeillei lives

= Colletes abeillei =

Species of bee

Colletes abeillei, also known as Abeille's cellophane bee, is a species of bee belonging to the subfamily Colletinae. It is native all throughout the Western Mediterranean. It prefers flowers of the Cistus genus and various flower species of the Apiaceae family.

== Distribution ==
This species is distributed across the western Mediterranean Sea. Warm, flower-rich habitats including pasture, coastal dunes, woodland edges, maquis, field margins and scrub. Regions in its range include the western Italian coast, Sicily, southern France, Spain, Portugal, the Balearic Islands, and Morocco.

== Description ==
It is a medium-sized species with an appearance and distribution similar to Colletes fodiens. The females of this species possess a dense covering of pale buffish thoracic hairs and broad off-white abdominal bands. Males possess a somewhat thinner abdominal bands and greyer thoracic hairs.
