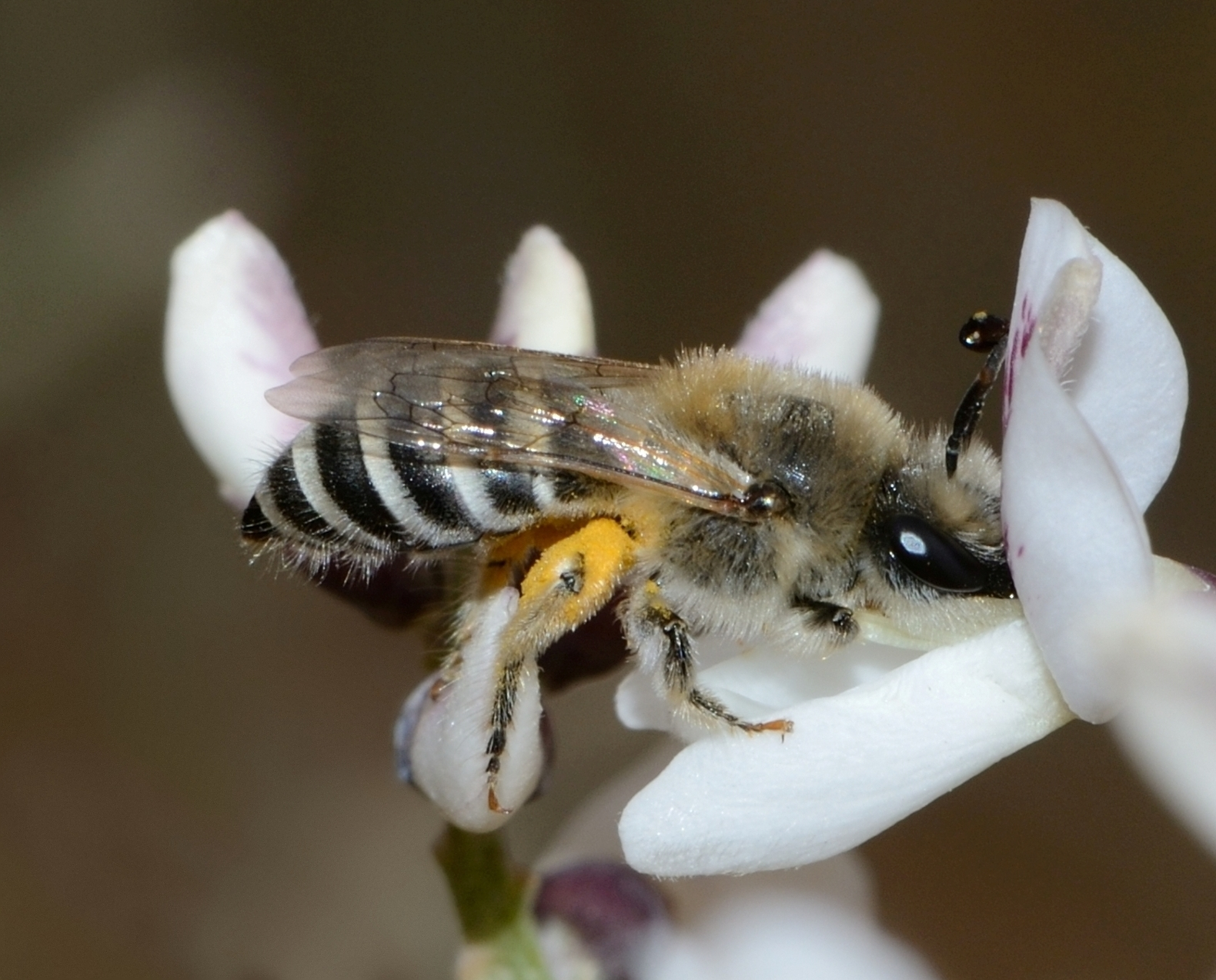
- Colletes judaicus female on Retama raetam

Scientific classification
- Kingdom: Animalia
- Phylum: Arthropoda
- Clade: Pancrustacea
- Class: Insecta
- Order: Hymenoptera
- Family: Colletidae
- Subfamily: Colletinae
- Genus: Colletes; Latreille, 1802

Species
- Over 450 species (see text)

= Colletes =

Genus of bees

Colletes (plasterer bees or cellophane bees) is a large genus of smallish and hairy ground-nesting bees of the short-tongued bee family Colletidae. They have an almost worldwide distribution, but occur primarily in the Northern Hemisphere where they are found almost everywhere up to the edge of the Arctic ice.

Plasterer bees were traditionally held to be a very ancient lineage; however, research in the early 2000s revealed their primitive traits to have been simply retained from ancestral bees. As of 2012 there were about 470 described species, and an estimated total around 700. They occur throughout the world except in Antarctica, Australia, Madagascar, and Southeast Asia. There are about 60 species in Europe and about 100 in North America north of Mexico. Due to their breeding habits, they require soils that are somewhat sandy and not too humid; the bulk of their diversity is found in temperate to subtropical Asia, in particular Central Asia. Since their relatives are found mainly in the Americas and Australia, the high diversity of Colletes in Asia is probably secondary and fairly recent, with the genus most likely originating in tropical America perhaps as much as 50 million years ago, and diversifying abundantly in the highly continental climate they found in interior Eurasia.

== Description and ecology ==
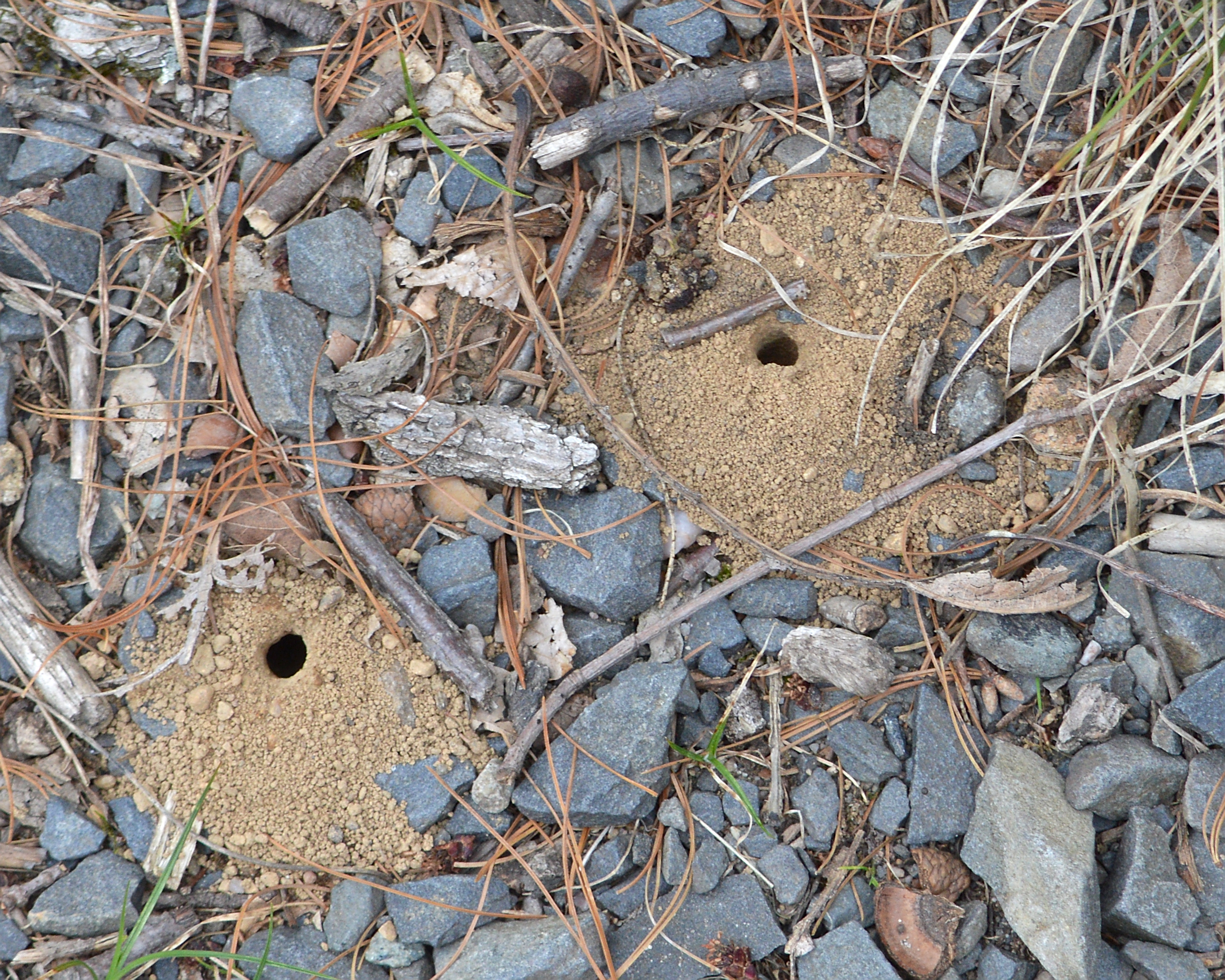
Nest entrances of an unidentified Colletes in Wyckoff, New Jersey, USA

Most Colletes species are somewhat similar to a diminutive honey bee. They are typically some 1–2 cm (0.39–0.79 in) long as adults, with large vertical compound eyes, and usually have a dense coat of whitish, light grey or yellowish-brown hair on their thorax and head. Almost all have light hairy bands on the end of the major segments of the abdomen upperside. Their antennae are moderately long by bee standards, and gently curved. From other short-tongued bees they can be distinguished by having a two-lobed tongue, the posterior part of the second recurrent wing vein forming an outward bow, as well as the shape of the first abdominal segment (propodeum). The latter has a longitudinally crested short subhorizontal to vertical basal zone in Colletes bees, which in most species abruptly ends with a crosswise ridge or break in slope.

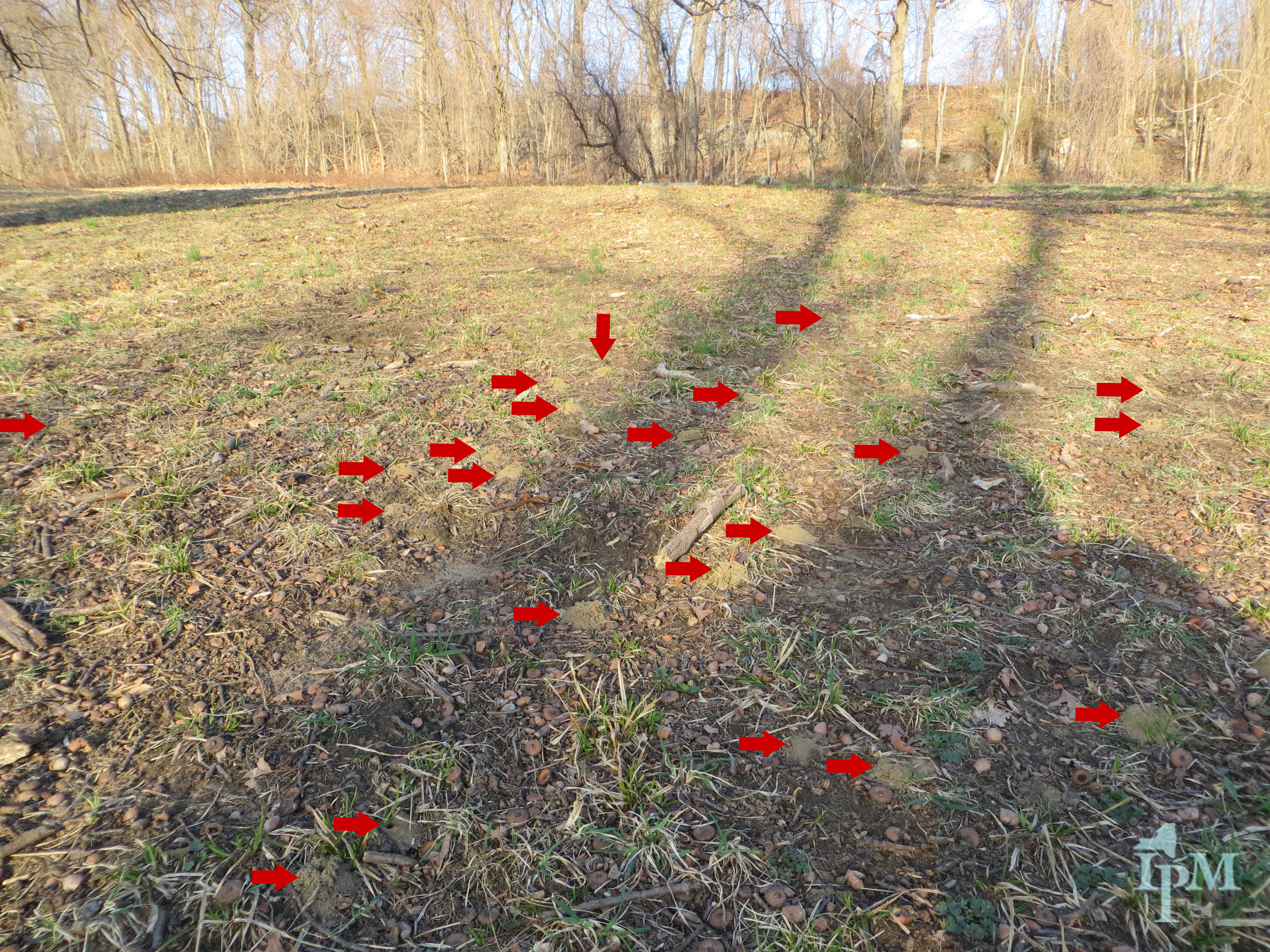
Nest density in an aggregation of an unidentified Colletes species; each red arrow marks a nest entrance

They tend to be solitary, but sometimes nest close together in aggregations. The females collect pollen for their offspring with the hindlegs and the bottom of the propodeum. Despite being small and solitary, Colletes bees may be keystone pollinators and some are economically important as pollinators of fruit trees, green manure plants, or fruiting Ericaceae; most species are at least somewhat specialized as regards the flowers they visit, and some (such as the ivy bee) preferentially forage on one or very few plant species. Species in the genus have no separate worker caste, each mature female build cells in her own underground nest and lines them with a cellophane-like plastic secretion. This is a true polyester mostly consisting of polymerized 18-hydroxyoctadecanoic acid and 20-hydroxyeicosanoic acid which is applied to a matrix of silken threads, earning them the nickname polyester bees. Colletes nests are attacked by parasites such as Stenoria beetles, and particularly cuckoo bees of genus Epeolus, whose females have specialized abdominal cutting spines for slicing open the protective polyester coating to deposit their eggs. Males of some Colletes are the only pollinators of certain Ophrys orchids, whose flowers look and scent mimick the bees' females.

== Gallery ==
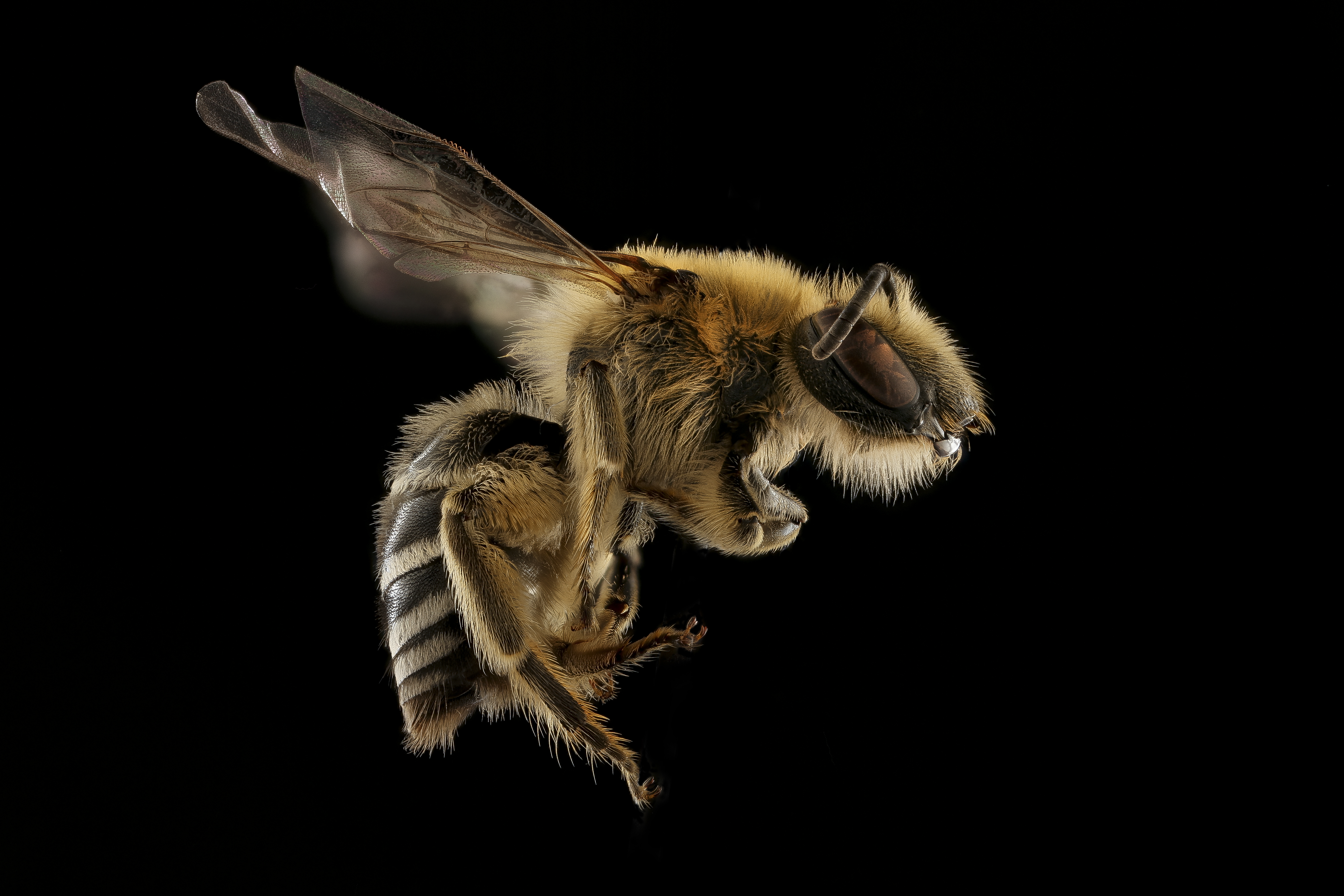
Colletes aestivalis female

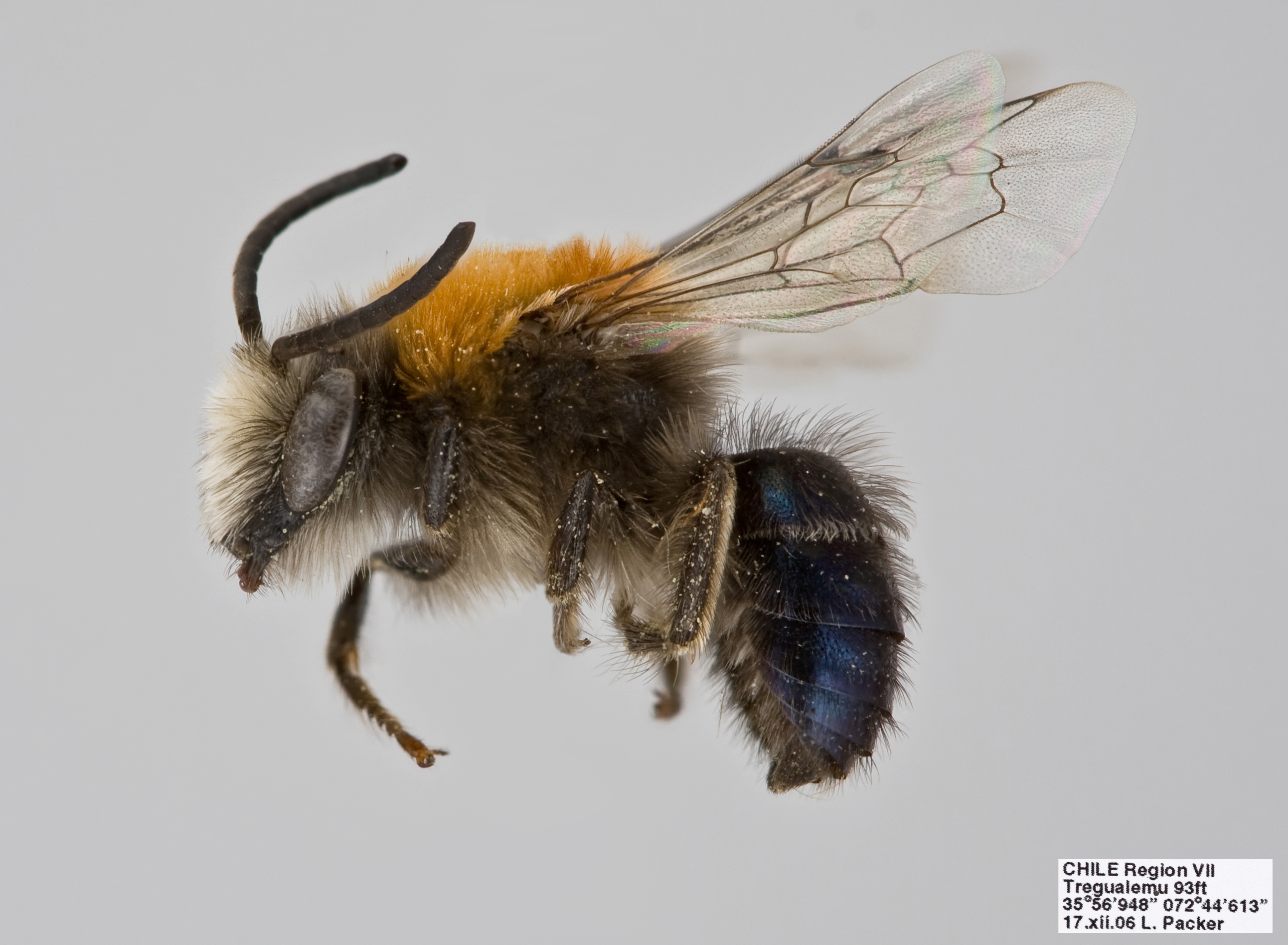
Colletes atripes male

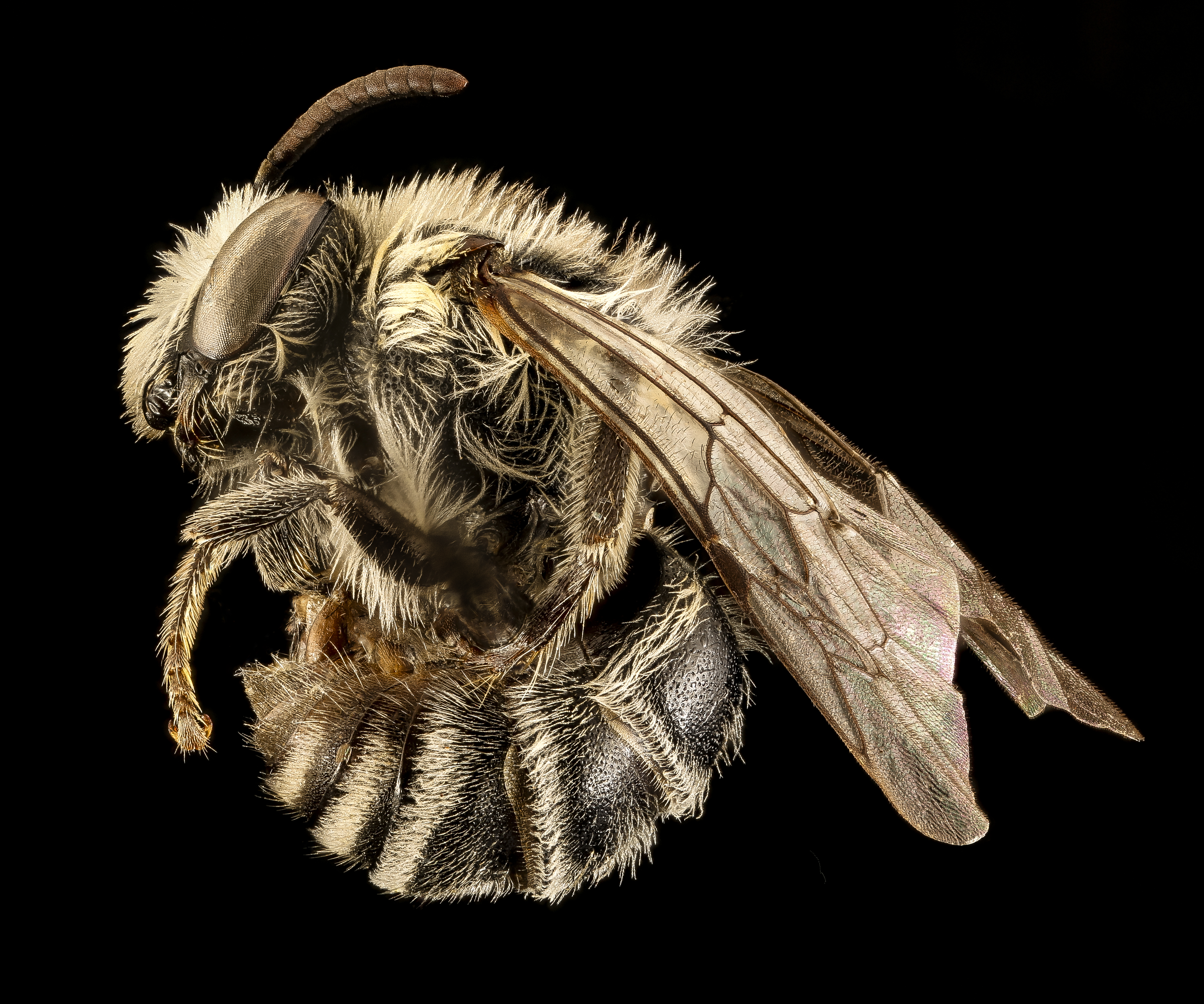
Colletes brevicornis male

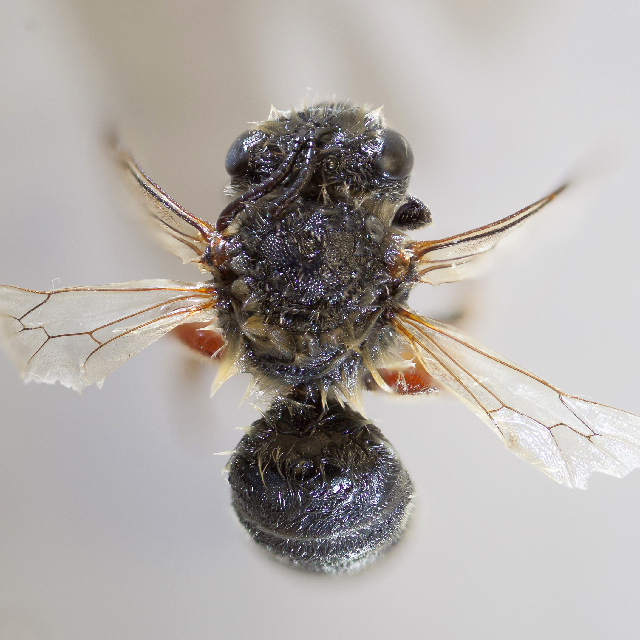
Colletes capensis

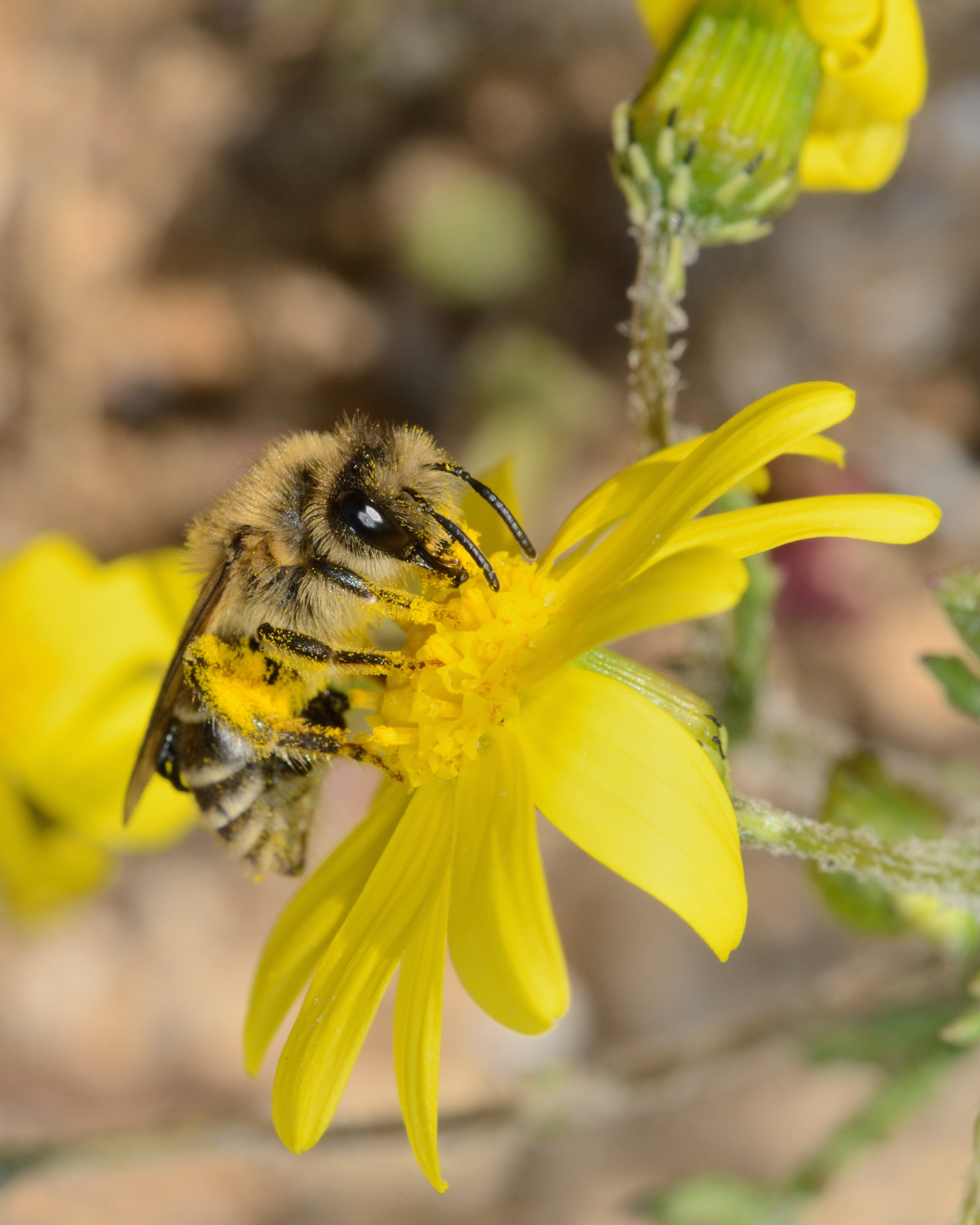
Colletes cariniger female on Senecio leucanthemifolius subsp. vernalis

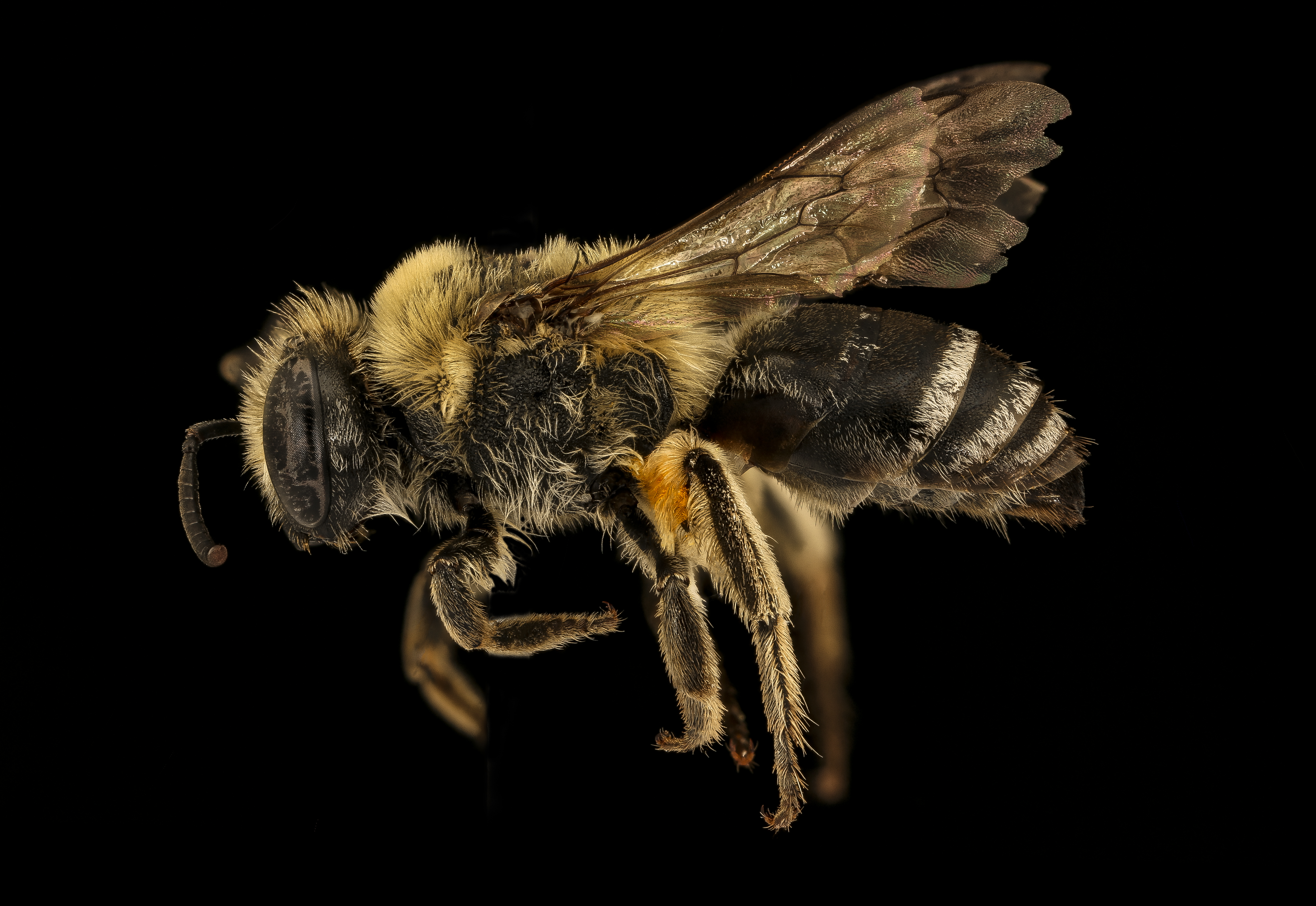
Colletes ciliatus female

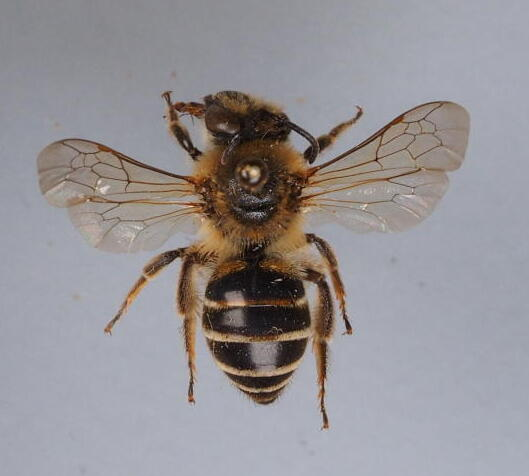
Colletes collaris

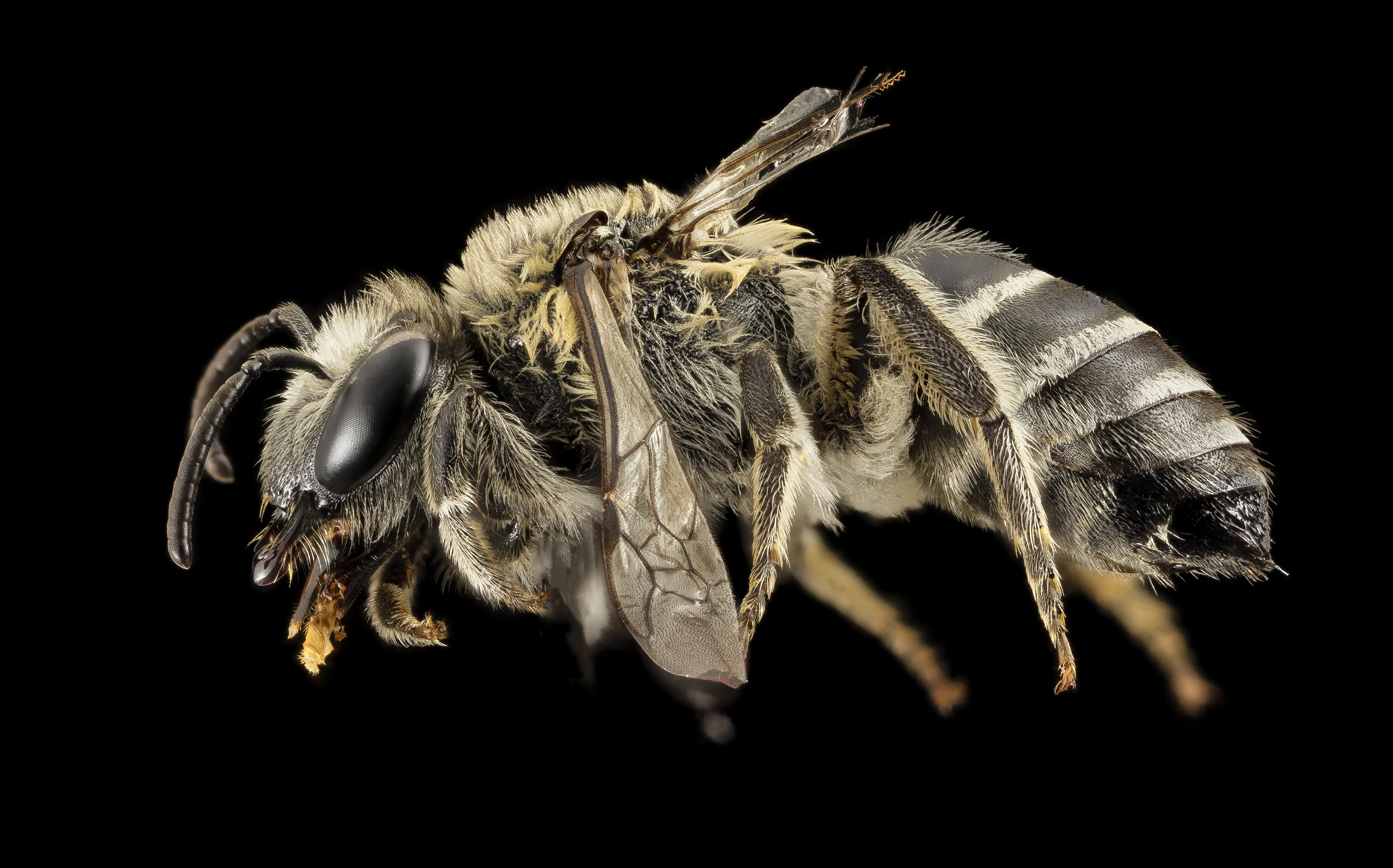
Colletes distinctus female

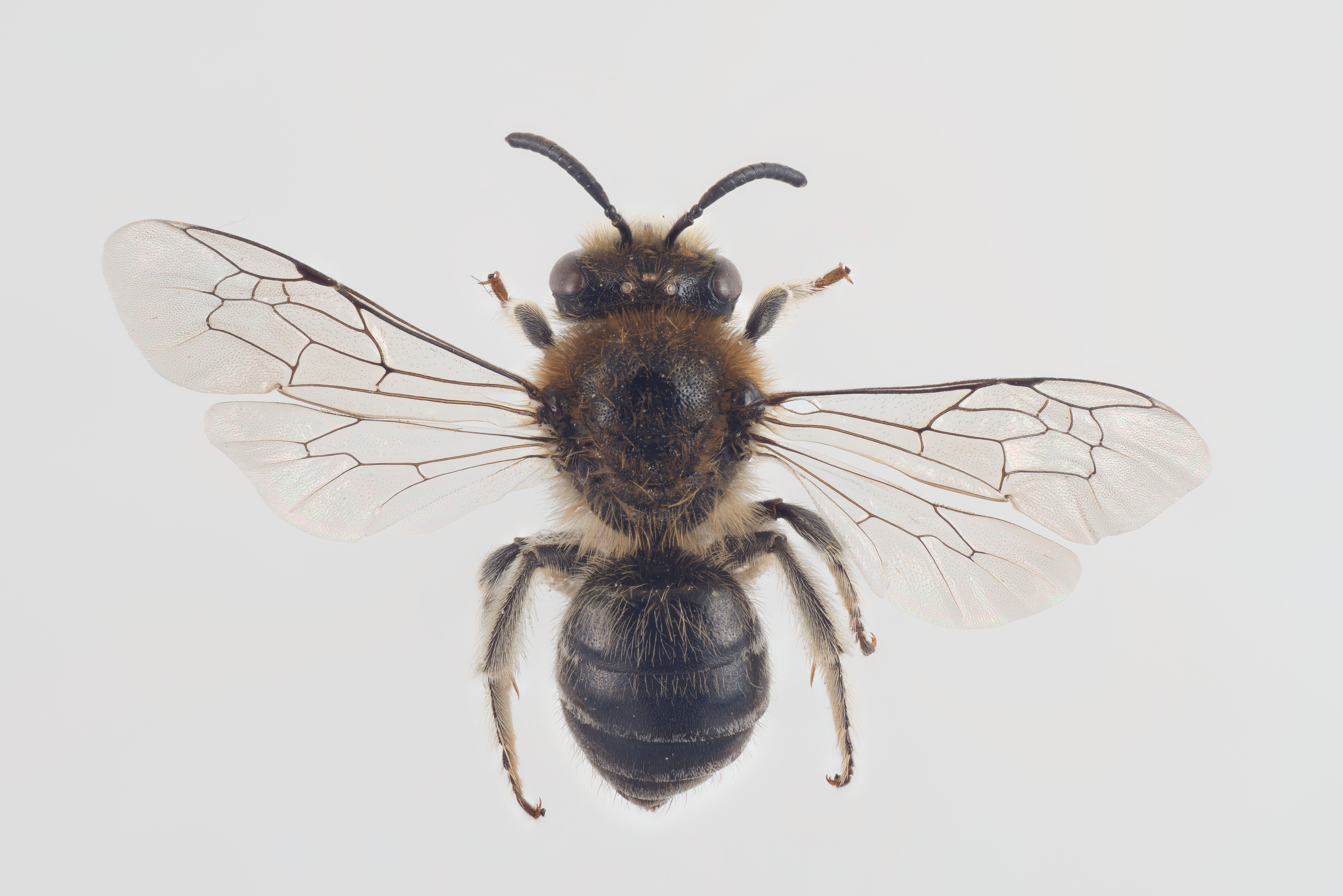
Colletes impunctatus

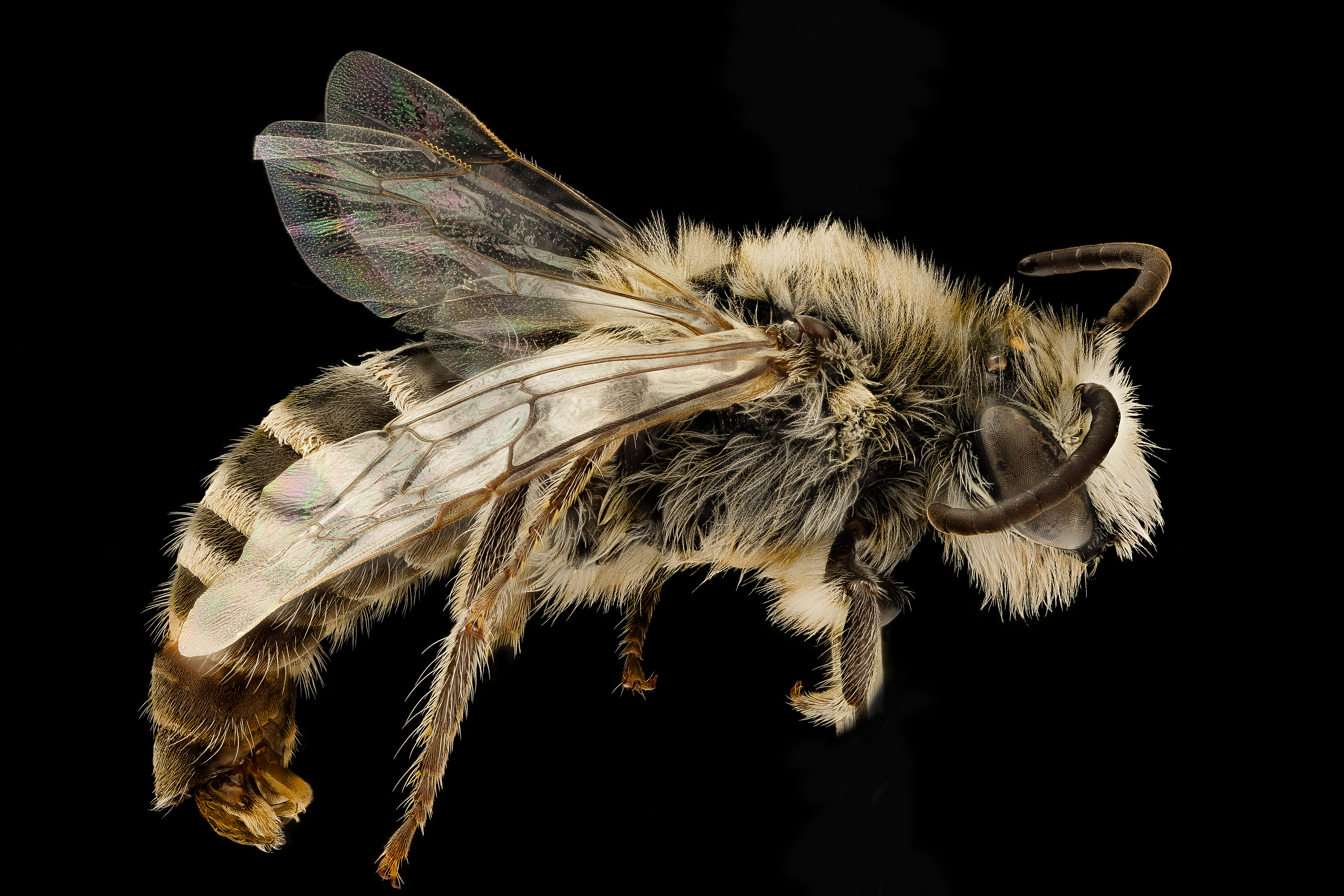
Colletes laticinctus male

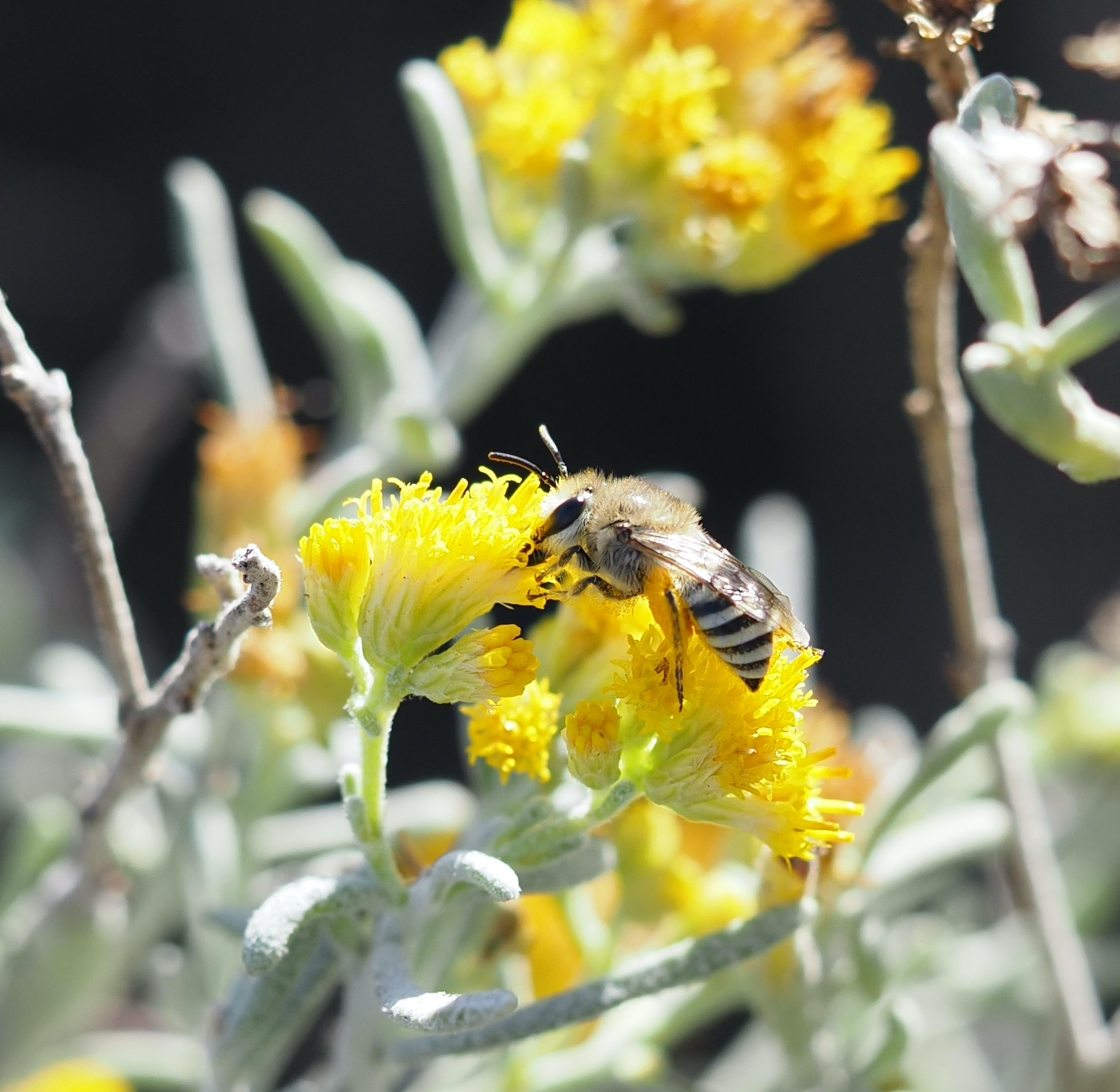
Colletes moricei

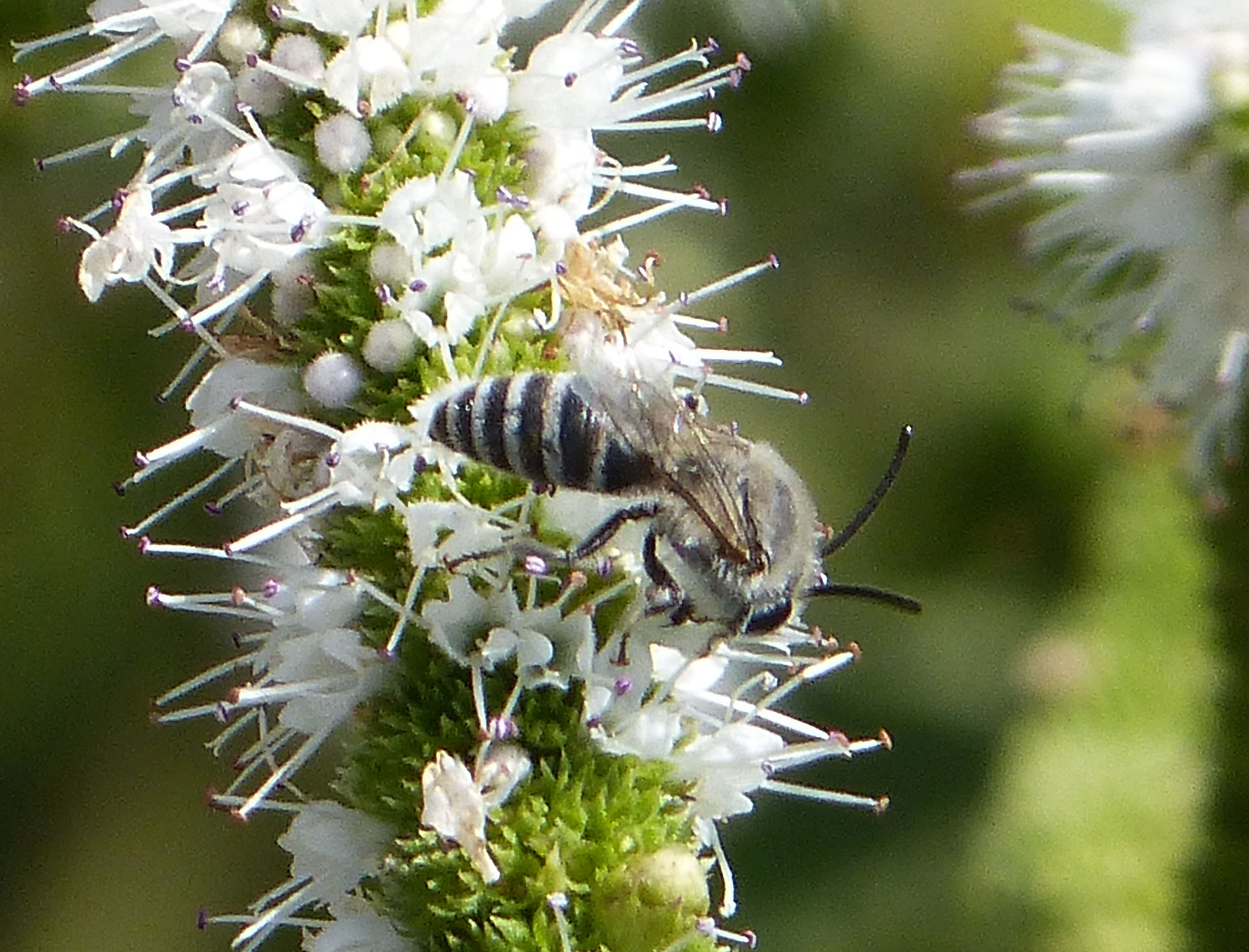
Colletes nigricans

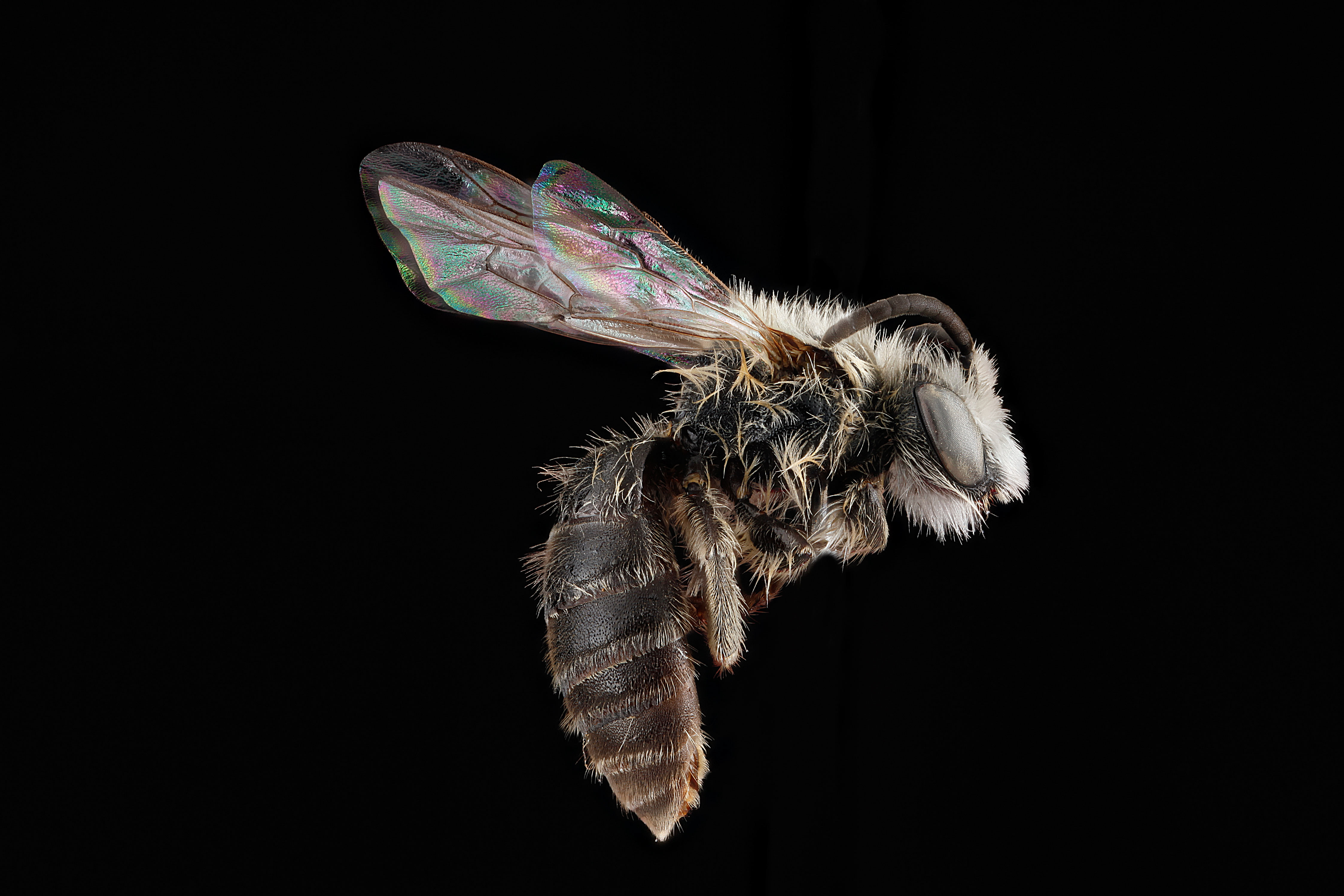
Colletes nigrifrons male

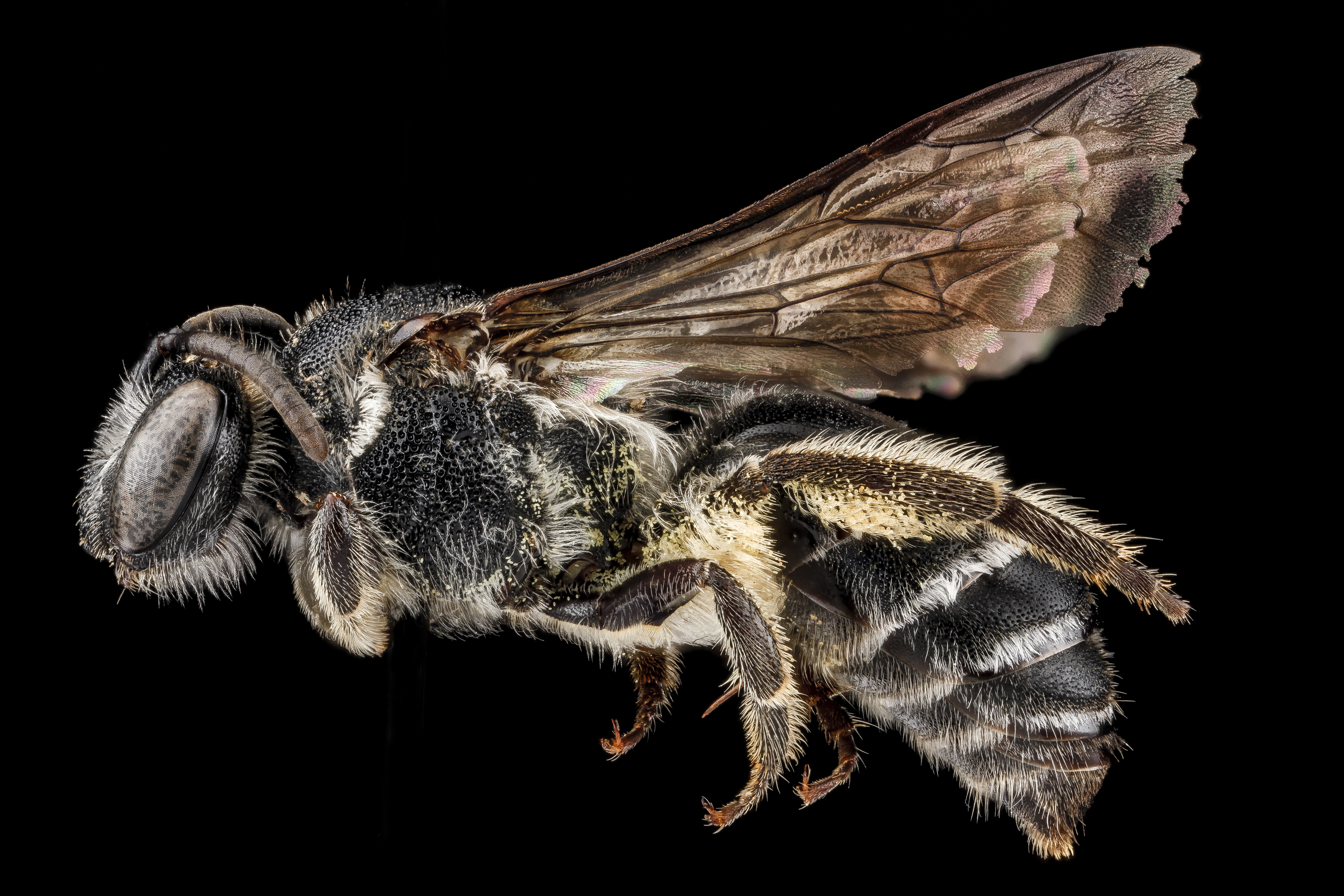
Colletes nudus female

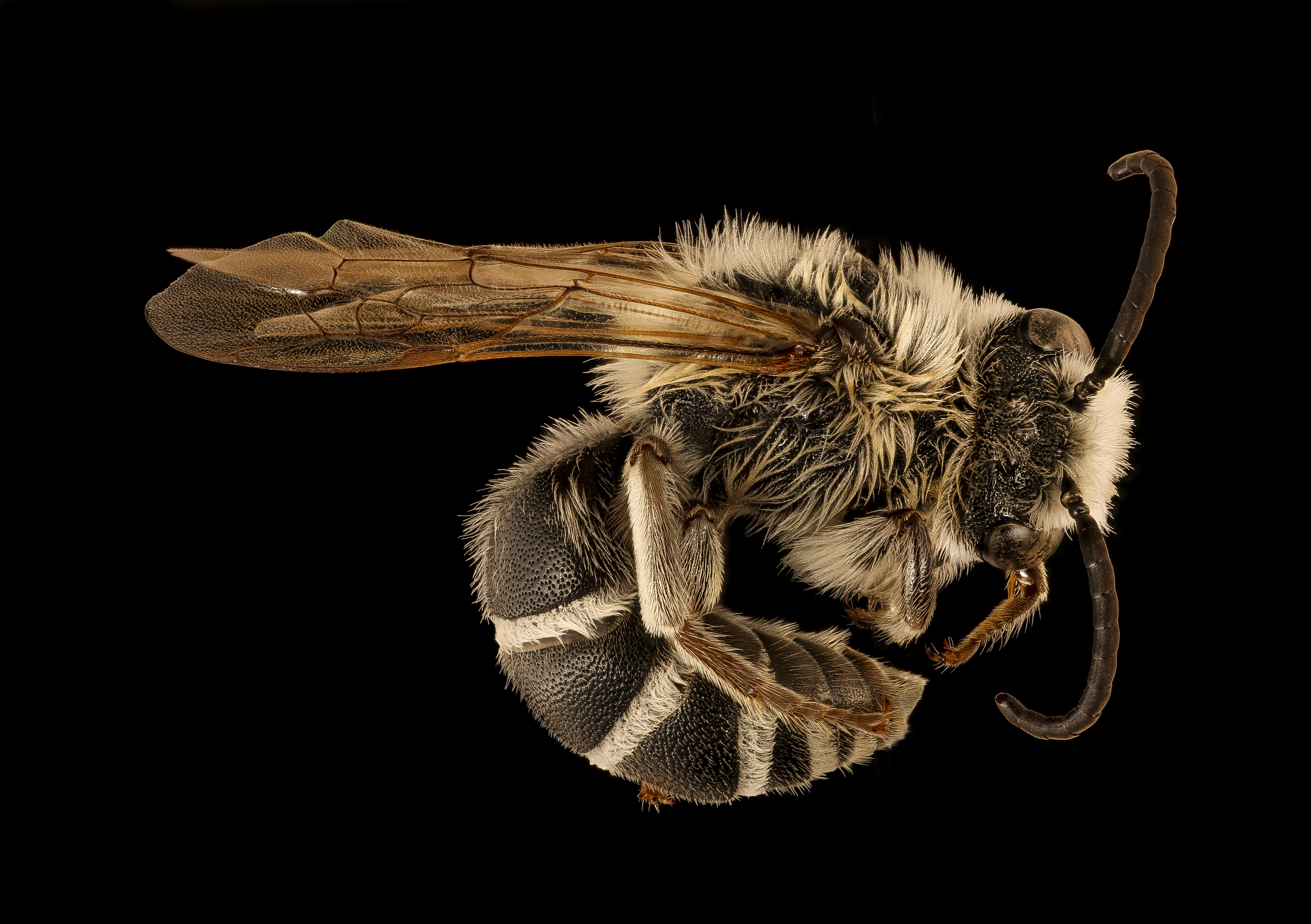
Colletes robertsonii male

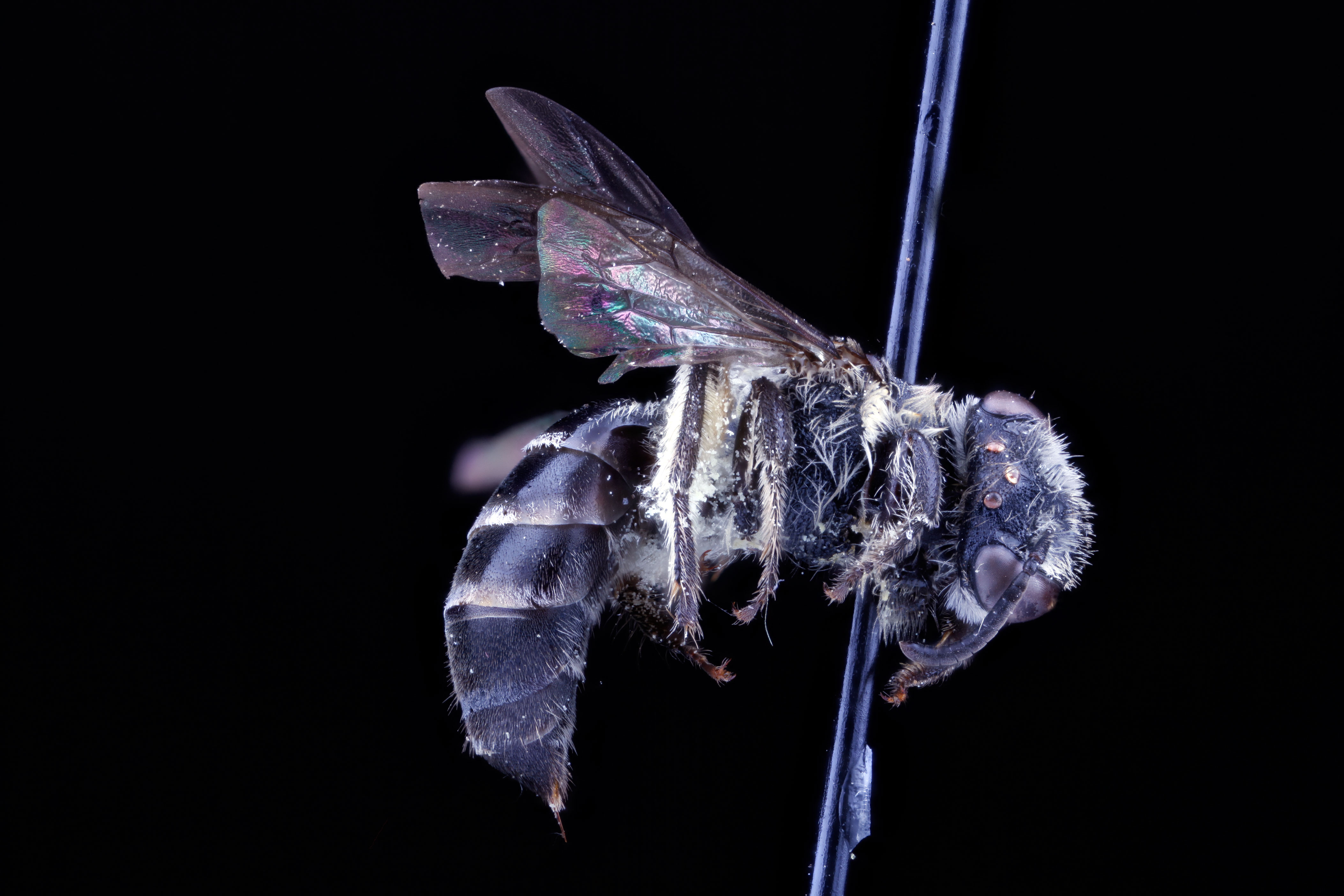
Colletes thysanellae female

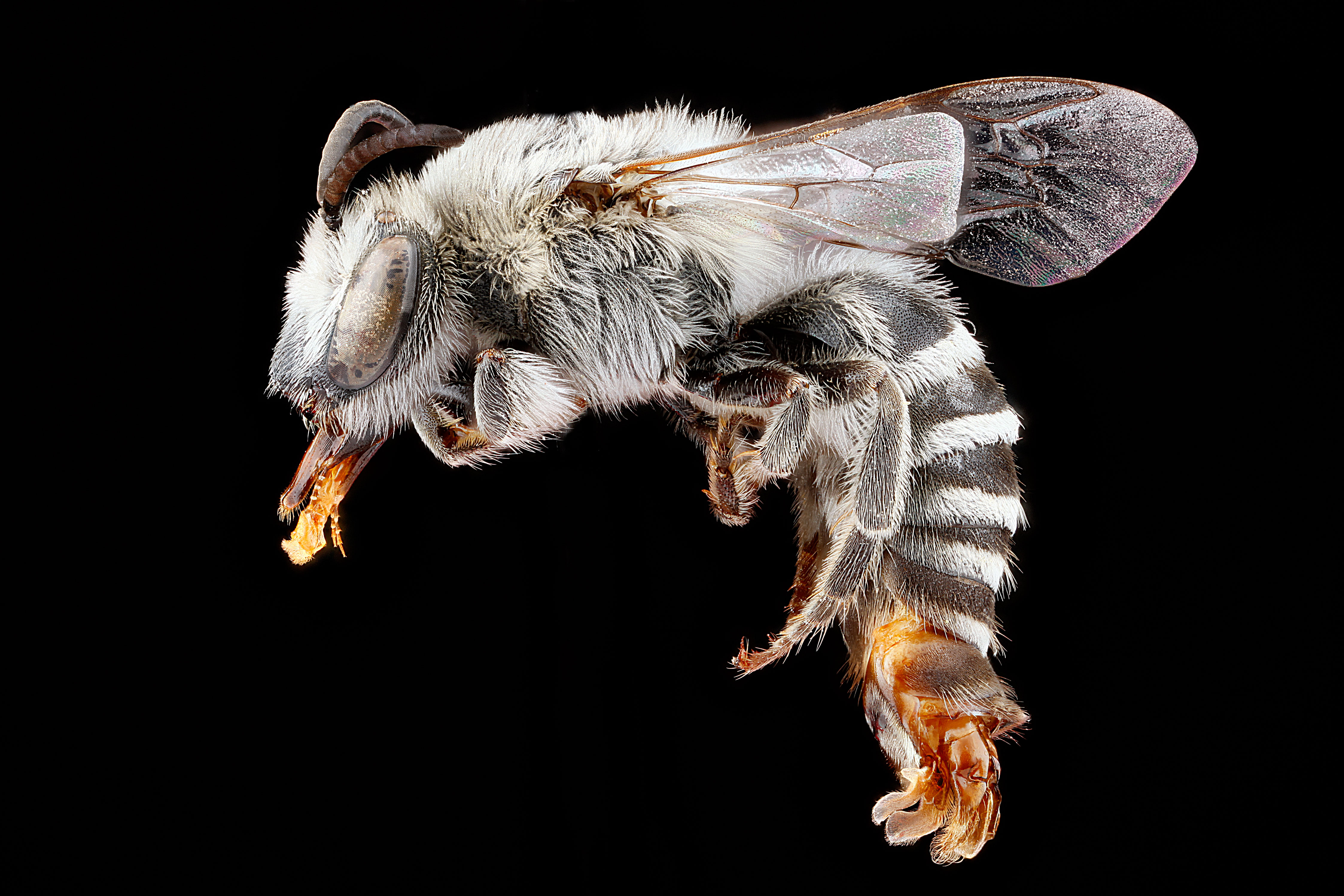
Colletes willistoni male

== Species ==
- Colletes abeillei
- Colletes aberrans
- Colletes abessinicus
- Colletes abnormis
- Colletes acutiformis
- Colletes acutus
- Colletes aestivalis
- Colletes aethiops
- Colletes albescens
- Colletes albicinctus
- Colletes albohirtus
- Colletes albomaculatus
- Colletes alfkeni
- Colletes alfredjohni
- Colletes algarobiae
- Colletes alicularis
- Colletes alini
- Colletes alocochila
- Colletes americanus
- Colletes anceps
- Colletes anchusae
- Colletes andrewsi
- Colletes angelicus
- Colletes ankarae
- Colletes annae
- Colletes annapurnensis
- Colletes annejohnae
- Colletes annulicornis
- Colletes antecessus
- Colletes antiguensis
- Colletes arabicus
- Colletes araucariae
- Colletes arenarius
- Colletes aridus
- Colletes arizonensis
- Colletes armeniacus
- Colletes arsenjevi
- Colletes arztbergi
- Colletes asiaticus
- Colletes askhabadensis
- Colletes atacamensis
- Colletes atlassus
- Colletes atripes
- Colletes aureocinctus
- Colletes azteka
- Colletes azureus
- Colletes babai
- Colletes banksi
- Colletes beamerorum
- Colletes bernadettae
- Colletes bhutanicus
- Colletes bicolor
- Colletes bidentulus
- Colletes birkmanni
- Colletes bischoffi
- Colletes biskrensis
- Colletes bokkeveldi
- Colletes bombiformis
- Colletes bradleyi
- Colletes brethesi
- Colletes brevicornis
- Colletes brevigena
- Colletes brevinodis
- Colletes brimleyi
- Colletes brumalis
- Colletes bruneri
- Colletes brunneitarsis
- Colletes bryanti
- Colletes bulbotibialis
- Colletes bumeliae
- Colletes bytinskii
- Colletes californicus
- Colletes canescens
- Colletes capensis
- Colletes capitatus
- Colletes cardiurus
- Colletes carinatus
- Colletes cariniger
- Colletes caskanus
- Colletes caspicus
- Colletes cercidii
- Colletes chalybaeus
- Colletes chamaesarachae
- Colletes chengtehensis
- Colletes ciliatoides
- Colletes ciliatus
- Colletes cinctellus
- Colletes cinerascens
- Colletes claripes
- Colletes clarus
- Colletes clematidis
- Colletes clypearis
- Colletes clypeatus
- Colletes clypeonitens
- Colletes cognatus
- Colletes collaris
- Colletes comatus
- Colletes comberi
- Colletes compactus
- Colletes conradti
- Colletes consors
- Colletes constrictus
- Colletes coriandri
- Colletes costaricensis
- Colletes covilleae
- Colletes cretaceus
- Colletes creticus
- Colletes cunicularius
- Colletes cyanescens
- Colletes cyaneus
- Colletes cyanonitidus
- Colletes cyprius
- Colletes daleae
- Colletes daourus
- Colletes daviesanus
- Colletes delicatus
- Colletes delodontus
- Colletes dentiventris
- Colletes denudatus
- Colletes deserticola
- Colletes desertorum
- Colletes dilatatus
- Colletes dimidiatus
- Colletes dinizi
- Colletes diodontus
- Colletes distinctus
- Colletes dorni
- Colletes dorsalis
- Colletes dubitatus
- Colletes dudgeonii
- Colletes durbanensis
- Colletes dusmeti
- Colletes eardleyi
- Colletes eatoni
- Colletes ebmeri
- Colletes edentulus
- Colletes elegans
- Colletes emaceatus
- Colletes eous
- Colletes esakii
- Colletes escalerai
- Colletes eulophi
- Colletes eupogonites
- Colletes everaertae
- Colletes extensicornis
- Colletes fasciatus
- Colletes fascicularis
- Colletes faurei
- Colletes flaminii
- Colletes flavicornis
- Colletes floralis
- Colletes fodiens
- Colletes formosus
- Colletes foveolaris
- Colletes francesae
- Colletes fraterculus
- Colletes friesei
- Colletes frontalis
- Colletes fulgidus
- Colletes fulvicornis
- Colletes fulvipes
- Colletes furfuraceus
- Colletes fuscicornis
- Colletes fusconotus
- Colletes gallicus
- Colletes gandhi
- Colletes genalis
- Colletes gessi
- Colletes gigas
- Colletes gilensis
- Colletes gilvus
- Colletes glaber
- Colletes glycyrrhizae
- Colletes gorillarum
- Colletes graeffei
- Colletes granpiedrensis
- Colletes grisellus
- Colletes griseus
- Colletes guadalajarensis
- Colletes guichardi
- Colletes gussakowskii
- Colletes gypsicolens
- Colletes hakkari
- Colletes halophilus
- Colletes harreri
- Colletes haubrugei
- Colletes hederae
- Colletes hedini
- Colletes hethiticus
- Colletes hicaco
- Colletes hiekejuniori
- Colletes hiekeseniori
- Colletes himalayensis
- Colletes hirtibasis
- Colletes howardi
- Colletes hyalinus
- Colletes hylaeiformis
- Colletes idoneus
- Colletes impunctatus
- Colletes inaequalis
- Colletes inconspicuus
- Colletes indicus
- Colletes inexpectatus
- Colletes infracognitus
- Colletes inornatus
- Colletes integer
- Colletes intermixtus
- Colletes intricatus
- Colletes inuncantipedis
- Colletes iranicus
- Colletes issykkuli
- Colletes isthmicus
- Colletes jankowskyi
- Colletes jejunus
- Colletes joergenseni
- Colletes judaicus
- Colletes kansensis
- Colletes karooensis
- Colletes kaszabi
- Colletes katharinae
- Colletes kerri
- Colletes kincaidii
- Colletes knersvlaktei
- Colletes kozlovi
- Colletes kudonis
- Colletes lacunatus
- Colletes laevifrons
- Colletes laevigena
- Colletes langeanus
- Colletes larreae
- Colletes latefasciatus
- Colletes laticaudus
- Colletes laticeps
- Colletes laticinctus
- Colletes latipes
- Colletes latitarsis
- Colletes lebedewi
- Colletes ligatus
- Colletes lineatus
- Colletes linsleyi
- Colletes longiceps
- Colletes longifacies
- Colletes louisae
- Colletes lucasi
- Colletes lucens
- Colletes lutzi
- Colletes luzhouensis
- Colletes lycii
- Colletes macconnelli
- Colletes mackieae
- Colletes maidli
- Colletes malleatus
- Colletes malmus
- Colletes mandibularis
- Colletes marginatus
- Colletes marleyi
- Colletes maroccanus
- Colletes mastochila
- Colletes merceti
- Colletes meridionalis
- Colletes metzi
- Colletes mexicanus
- Colletes meyeri
- Colletes michaelis
- Colletes micheneri
- Colletes michenerianus
- Colletes microdontoides
- Colletes microdontus
- Colletes mimincus
- Colletes minutissimus
- Colletes minutus
- Colletes missionum
- Colletes mitchelli
- Colletes mixtus
- Colletes mlokossewiczi
- Colletes moctezumensis
- Colletes montacuti
- Colletes montefragus
- Colletes morawitzi
- Colletes moricei
- Colletes motaguensis
- Colletes mourei
- Colletes murinus
- Colletes musculus
- Colletes nanaeformis
- Colletes nanellus
- Colletes nanus
- Colletes nasutus
- Colletes nautlanus
- Colletes neoqueenensis
- Colletes nieuwoudtvillei
- Colletes niger
- Colletes nigricans
- Colletes nigrifrons
- Colletes nigritulus
- Colletes nitescens
- Colletes nitidicollis
- Colletes niveatus
- Colletes noskiewiczi
- Colletes nudus
- Colletes obscurus
- Colletes ochraceus
- Colletes omanus
- Colletes opacicollis
- Colletes opacus
- Colletes ornatus
- Colletes ottomanus
- Colletes pallescens
- Colletes pallipes
- Colletes panamensis
- Colletes paniscus
- Colletes parafodiens
- Colletes paratibeticus
- Colletes patagonicus
- Colletes patellatus
- Colletes pauljohni
- Colletes penulatus
- Colletes perezi
- Colletes perforator
- Colletes perileucus
- Colletes perplexus
- Colletes persicus
- Colletes peruvicus
- Colletes petalostemonis
- Colletes petropolitanus
- Colletes phaceliae
- Colletes phenax
- Colletes pinnatus
- Colletes platycnema
- Colletes plebeius
- Colletes plumulosus
- Colletes pollinarius
- Colletes popovi
- Colletes productus
- Colletes prosopidis
- Colletes pseudocinerascens
- Colletes pseudojejunus
- Colletes pseudolaevigena
- Colletes pulchellus
- Colletes pumilus
- Colletes punctatus
- Colletes punctipennis
- Colletes quadrigenis
- Colletes radoszkowskii
- Colletes ravulus
- Colletes recurvatus
- Colletes reginae
- Colletes reinigi
- Colletes restingensis
- Colletes reticulatus
- Colletes rhodaspis
- Colletes robertsonii
- Colletes roborovskyi
- Colletes rohweri
- Colletes rothschildi
- Colletes rozeni
- Colletes rubellus
- Colletes rubicola
- Colletes rubripes
- Colletes rubrovittatus
- Colletes rudis
- Colletes ruficollis
- Colletes rufipes
- Colletes rufitarsis
- Colletes rufocinctus
- Colletes rufosignatus
- Colletes rufotibialis
- Colletes rugicollis
- Colletes rutilans
- Colletes salicicola
- Colletes salsolae
- Colletes sanctus
- Colletes saritensis
- Colletes schmidi
- Colletes schrottkyi
- Colletes schultzei
- Colletes schwarzi
- Colletes scopiventer
- Colletes seitzi
- Colletes sellatus
- Colletes seminitens
- Colletes seminitidus
- Colletes senilis
- Colletes sichuanensis
- Colletes sidemii
- Colletes sierrensis
- Colletes similis
- Colletes simulans
- Colletes simus
- Colletes skinneri
- Colletes skorikowi
- Colletes slevini
- Colletes sodalis
- Colletes solidaginis
- Colletes solitarius
- Colletes somereni
- Colletes sordescens
- Colletes sororcula
- Colletes speculiferus
- Colletes sphaeralceae
- Colletes spilopterus
- Colletes squamosus
- Colletes squamulosus
- Colletes stachi
- Colletes standfussi
- Colletes steinbachi
- Colletes stellatus
- Colletes stepheni
- Colletes striginasis
- Colletes subdilatatus
- Colletes submarginatus
- Colletes subnitens
- Colletes succinctus
- Colletes sulcatus
- Colletes susannae
- Colletes swenki
- Colletes tadschikus
- Colletes taiwanensis
- Colletes tardus
- Colletes tectiventris
- Colletes testaceipes
- Colletes texanus
- Colletes thoracicus
- Colletes thysanellae
- Colletes tibeticus
- Colletes timberlakei
- Colletes tinctulus
- Colletes tingoensis
- Colletes titusensis
- Colletes tomentosus
- Colletes transitorius
- Colletes trigonatus
- Colletes tuberculatus
- Colletes tuberculiger
- Colletes tulbaghensis
- Colletes turgiventris
- Colletes ulrikae
- Colletes uralensis
- Colletes utilis
- Colletes vachali
- Colletes wacki
- Colletes wahisi
- Colletes wahrmani
- Colletes validus
- Colletes vandykei
- Colletes warnckei
- Colletes watmoughi
- Colletes weiski
- Colletes westghats
- Colletes wickhami
- Colletes willistoni
- Colletes wilmattae
- Colletes virgatus
- Colletes wolfi
- Colletes wollmanni
- Colletes volsellatus
- Colletes wootoni
- Colletes xerophilus
- Colletes xuechengensis
- Colletes yemensis
- Colletes zuluensis
- Colletes zygophyllum
