= Colletes caspicus =

Scientific classification
- Kingdom: Animalia
- Phylum: Arthropoda
- Clade: Pancrustacea
- Class: Insecta
- Order: Hymenoptera
- Family: Colletidae
- Genus: Colletes
- Species: C. caspicus

Binomial name
- Colletes caspicus Morawitz, 1874

Species of bee

Colletes caspicus is a species of insect belonging to the family Colletidae.

It is native to Southern Europe and Western Asia.

Synonym:

- Colletes balticus (= Colletes caspicus balticus)
