= Colletes longifacies =

Conservation status
- Critically Imperiled (NatureServe)

Scientific classification
- Kingdom: Animalia
- Phylum: Arthropoda
- Clade: Pancrustacea
- Class: Insecta
- Order: Hymenoptera
- Family: Colletidae
- Genus: Colletes
- Species: C. longifacies

Binomial name
- Colletes longifacies Stephen, 1954

Species of bee

Colletes longifacies is a species of hymenopteran in the family Colletidae. It is found in North America. The species is one of five from the family Colletidae that are endemic to the state of Florida. The species occurs in North-Central Peninsular Florida and the Panhandle.
