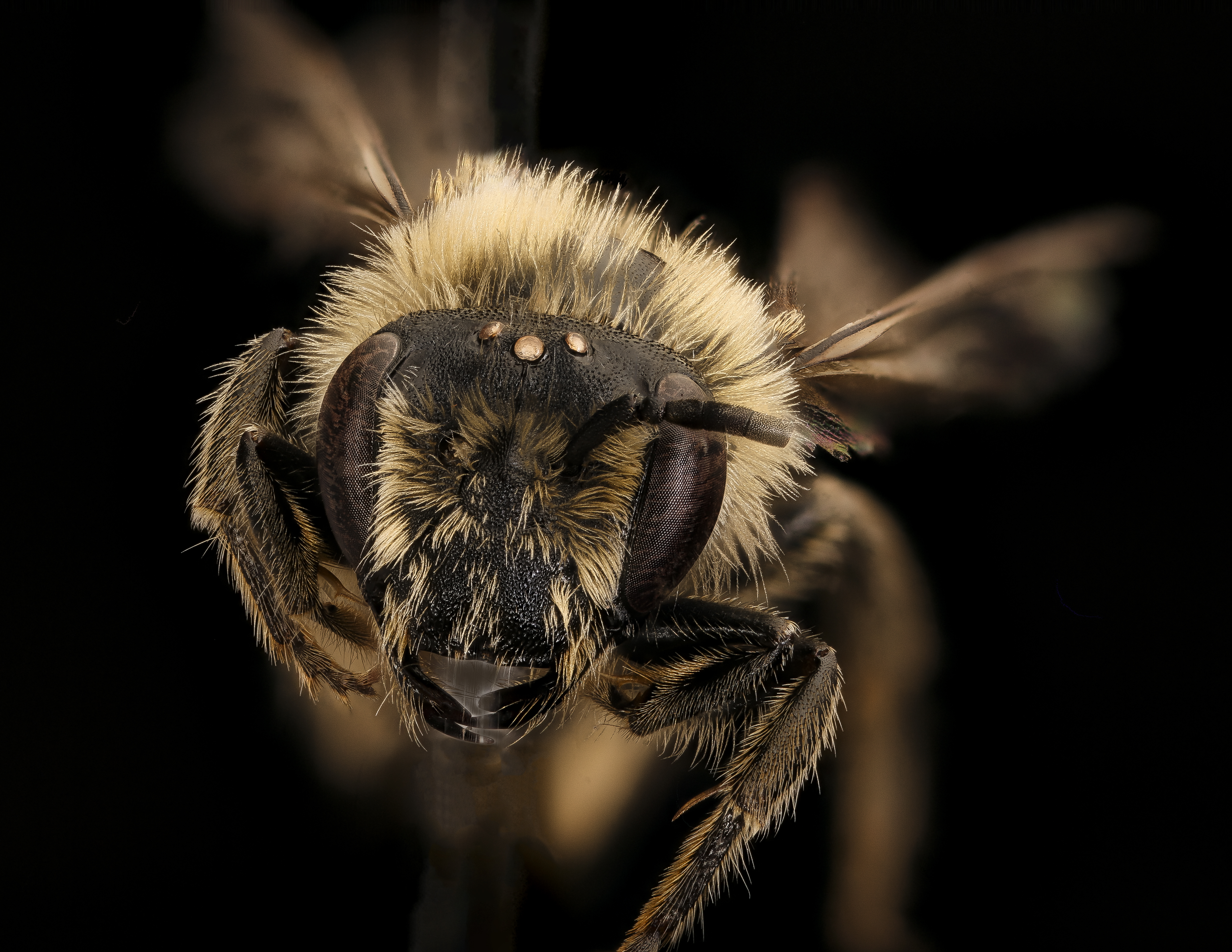

Scientific classification
- Kingdom: Animalia
- Phylum: Arthropoda
- Clade: Pancrustacea
- Class: Insecta
- Order: Hymenoptera
- Family: Colletidae
- Genus: Colletes
- Species: C. thoracicus

Binomial name
- Colletes thoracicus Smith, 1853

= Colletes thoracicus =

Species of bee

Colletes thoracicus, the rufous-chested cellophane bee, is a species of cellophane or plasterer, masked, or fork-tongued bee in the family Colletidae. It is found in North America.

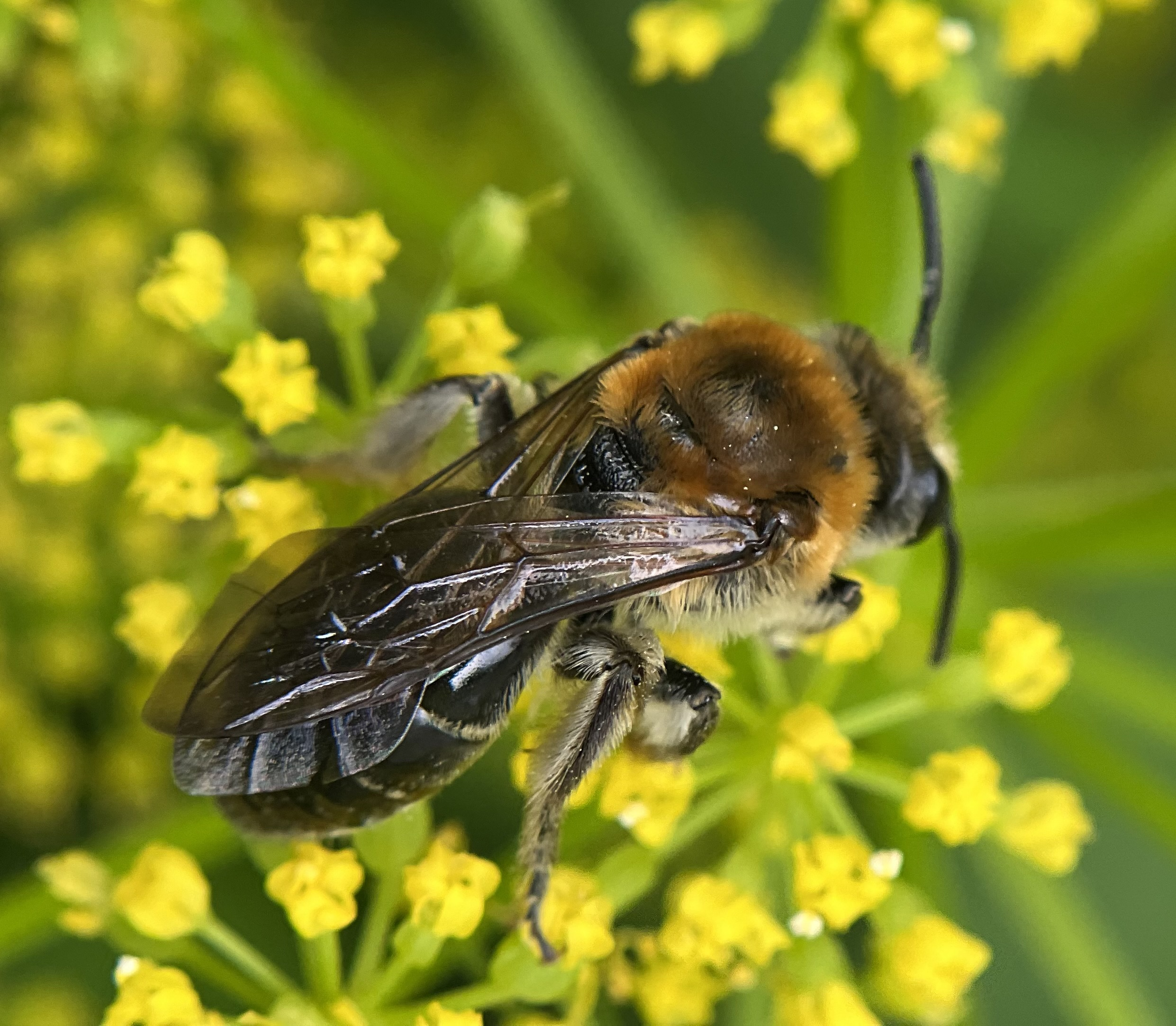
