= Colletes fulgidus =

Scientific classification
- Kingdom: Animalia
- Phylum: Arthropoda
- Clade: Pancrustacea
- Class: Insecta
- Order: Hymenoptera
- Family: Colletidae
- Genus: Colletes
- Species: C. fulgidus

Binomial name
- Colletes fulgidus Swenk, 1904

Species of bee

Colletes fulgidus is a species of hymenopteran in the family Colletidae. It is found in North America.

== Subspecies ==
These two subspecies belong to the species Colletes fulgidus:

- Colletes fulgidus fulgidus Swenk, 1904
- Colletes fulgidus longiplumosus Stephen, 1954 (long-plumed cellophane bee)
