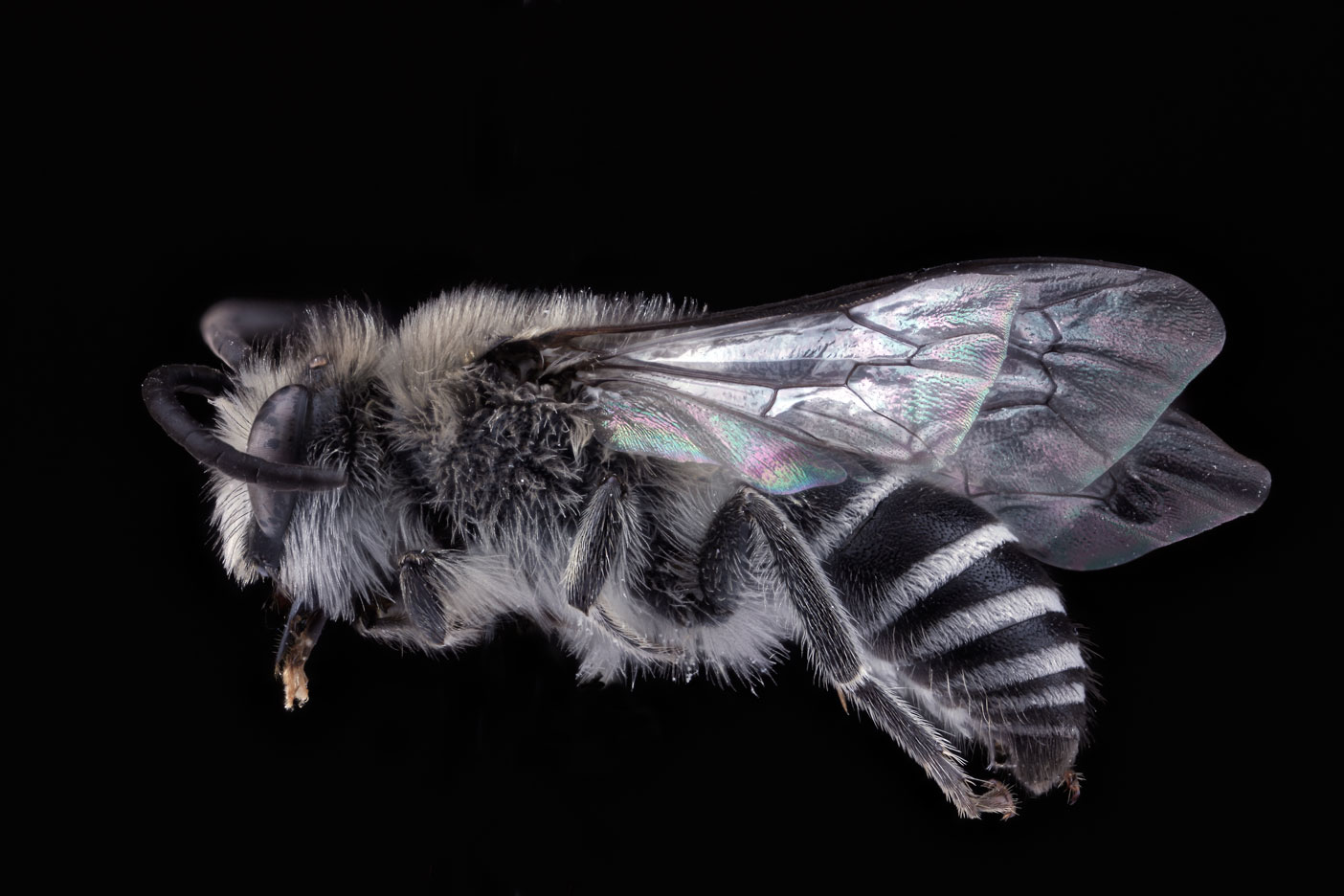

Scientific classification
- Kingdom: Animalia
- Phylum: Arthropoda
- Clade: Pancrustacea
- Class: Insecta
- Order: Hymenoptera
- Family: Colletidae
- Genus: Colletes
- Species: C. compactus

Binomial name
- Colletes compactus Cresson, 1868

= Colletes compactus =

Species of bee

Colletes compactus is a species of ground-nesting bee in the genus Colletes.
