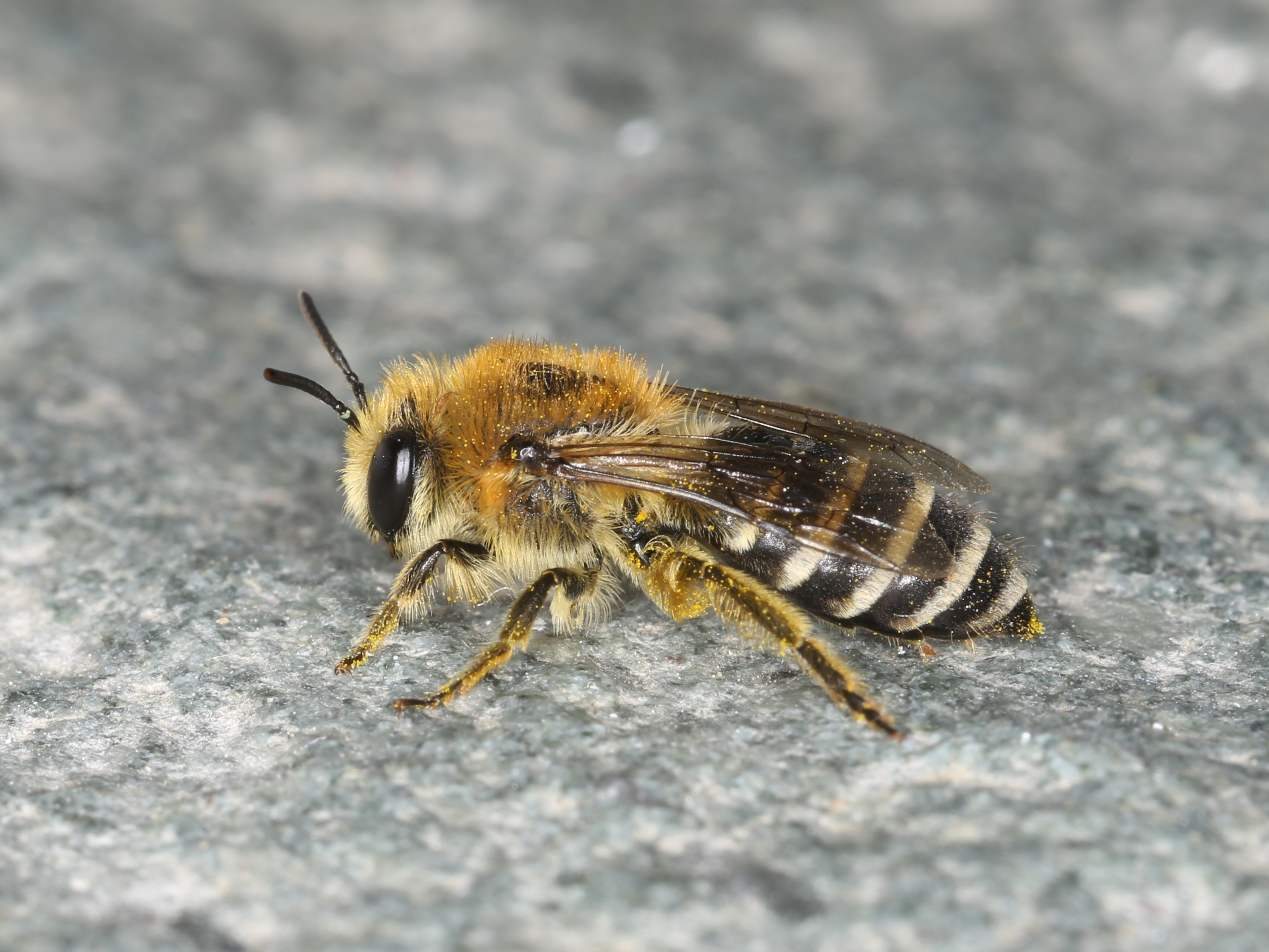
- Colletes daviesanus Copenhagen, Denmark

Scientific classification
- Domain: Eukaryota
- Kingdom: Animalia
- Phylum: Arthropoda
- Class: Insecta
- Order: Hymenoptera
- Family: Colletidae
- Subfamily: Colletinae
- Genus: Colletes
- Species: C. daviesanus

Binomial name
- Colletes daviesanus Smith, 1846

= Colletes daviesanus =

Species of bee

Colletes daviesanus is a Palearctic species of plasterer bee.
