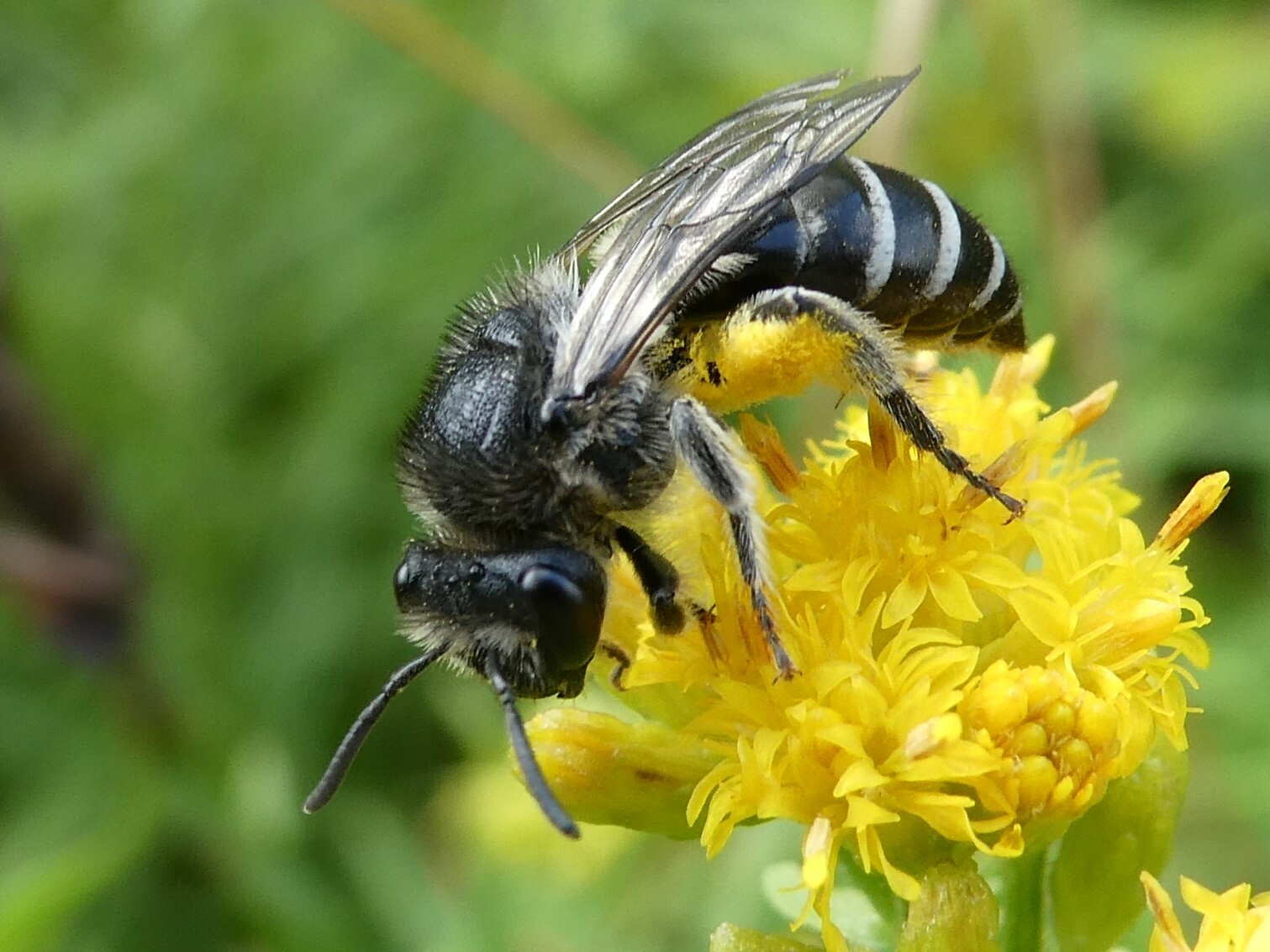
- Vermont, 2022

Scientific classification
- Kingdom: Animalia
- Phylum: Arthropoda
- Clade: Pancrustacea
- Class: Insecta
- Order: Hymenoptera
- Family: Colletidae
- Genus: Colletes
- Species: C. simulans

Binomial name
- Colletes simulans Cresson, 1868

= Colletes simulans =

Species of bee

Colletes simulans is a species in the family Colletidae ("cellophane or plasterer, masked, and fork-tongued bees"), in the order Hymenoptera ("ants, bees, wasps and sawflies"). The species is known generally as the spine-shouldered cellophane bee. It is found in North America.
