= Colletes wilmattae =

Scientific classification
- Kingdom: Animalia
- Phylum: Arthropoda
- Clade: Pancrustacea
- Class: Insecta
- Order: Hymenoptera
- Family: Colletidae
- Genus: Colletes
- Species: C. wilmattae

Binomial name
- Colletes wilmattae Cockerell, 1904

Species of bee

Colletes wilmattae is a species of cellophane bee in the family Colletidae. The species is native to the United States and Canada.
