= Colletes elegans =

Scientific classification
- Kingdom: Animalia
- Phylum: Arthropoda
- Clade: Pancrustacea
- Class: Insecta
- Order: Hymenoptera
- Family: Colletidae
- Genus: Colletes
- Species: C. elegans

Binomial name
- Colletes elegans Noskiewicz, 1936

Species of bee

Colletes elegans a species of ground-nesting bee in the genus Colletes, which is found in Israel. It has been found that the species has a strong preference during pollination to plants in the family Resedaceae.

== See also ==
- List of bees of Israel
