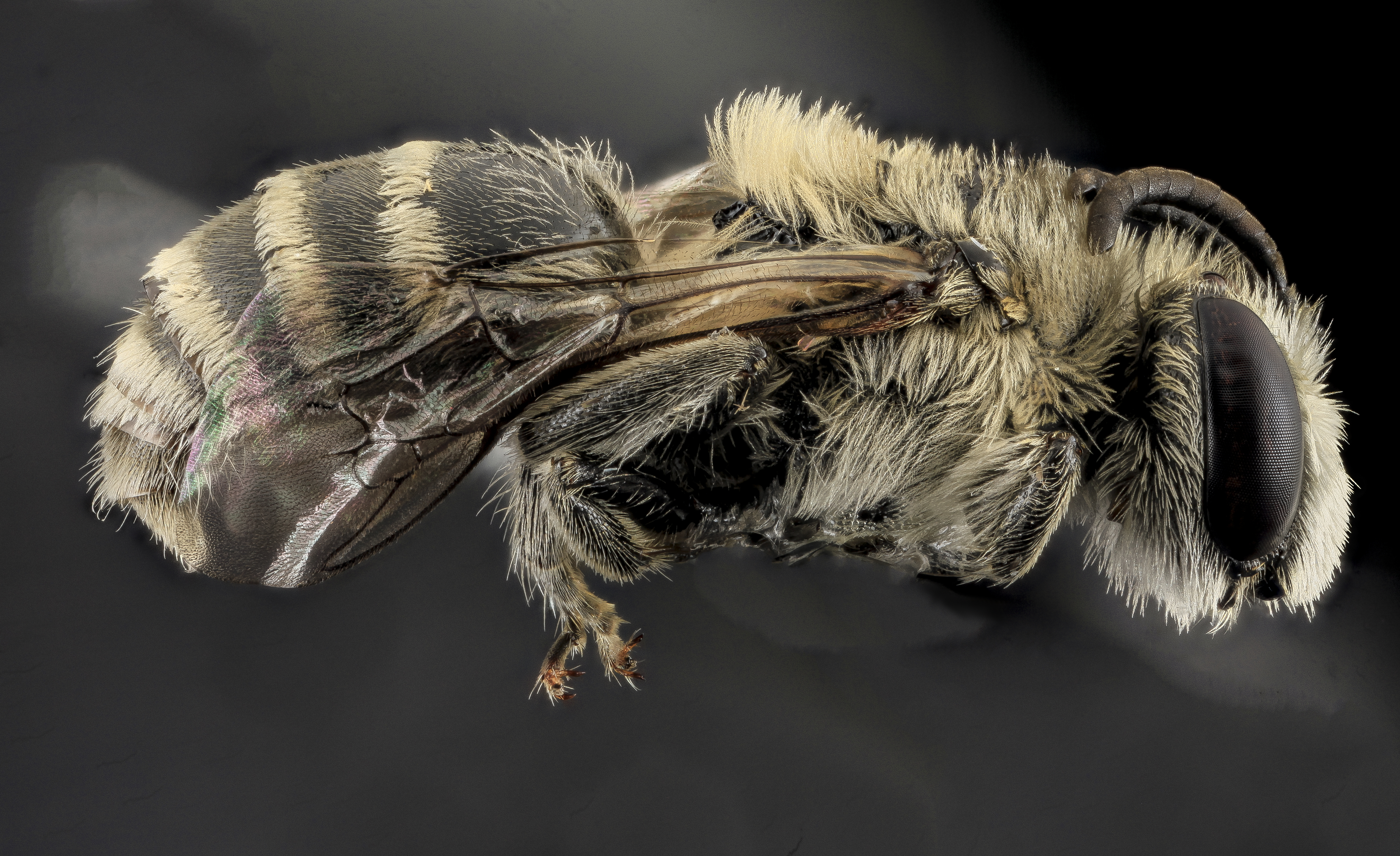

Scientific classification
- Kingdom: Animalia
- Phylum: Arthropoda
- Clade: Pancrustacea
- Class: Insecta
- Order: Hymenoptera
- Family: Colletidae
- Genus: Colletes
- Species: C. titusensis

Binomial name
- Colletes titusensis Mitchell, 1951

= Colletes titusensis =

Species of bee

Colletes titusensis is a species of hymenopteran in the family Colletidae.

It is a rare species of bee, with specimens only collected near Titusville, Florida. It was first described in 1951. A specimen was collected at Canaveral National Seashore (near Cape Canaveral). The National Park Service reports it is a southeastern endemic polyester bee.
