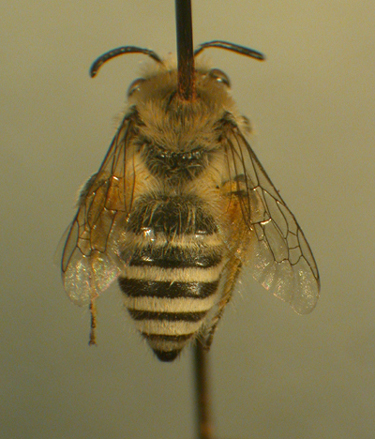

Scientific classification
- Kingdom: Animalia
- Phylum: Arthropoda
- Clade: Pancrustacea
- Class: Insecta
- Order: Hymenoptera
- Family: Colletidae
- Genus: Colletes
- Species: C. hyalinus

Binomial name
- Colletes hyalinus Provancher, 1888

= Colletes hyalinus =

Species of bee

Colletes hyalinus is a species of hymenopteran in the family Colletidae. It is found in North America.

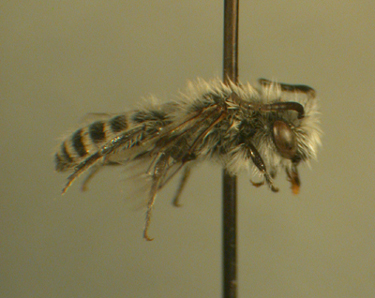
Hyaline cellophane bee, Colletes hyalinus

== Subspecies ==
These three subspecies belong to the species Colletes hyalinus:

- Colletes hyalinus gaudialis Cockerell, 1905
- Colletes hyalinus hyalinus Provancher, 1888
- Colletes hyalinus oregonensis Timberlake, 1951
