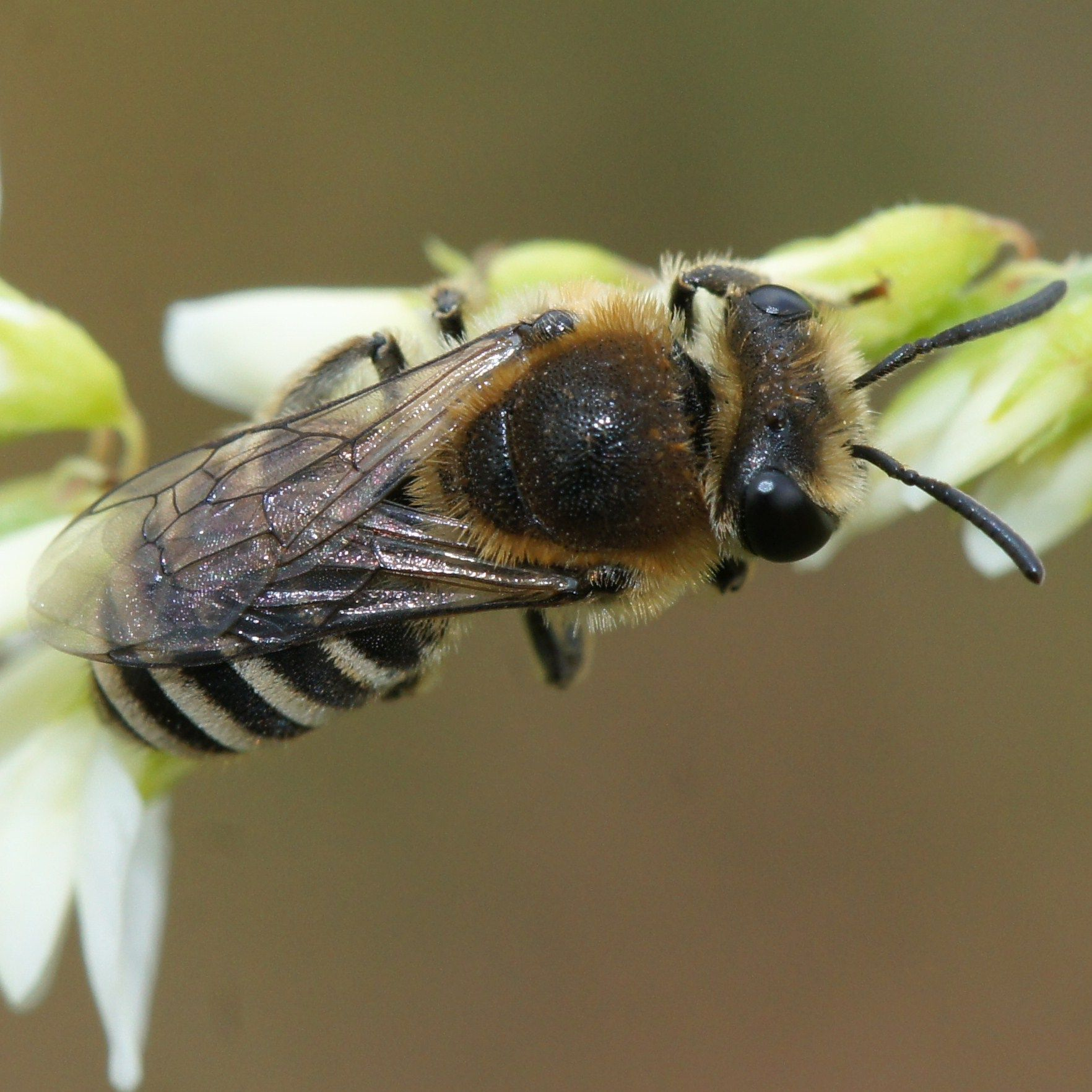

Scientific classification
- Kingdom: Animalia
- Phylum: Arthropoda
- Clade: Pancrustacea
- Class: Insecta
- Order: Hymenoptera
- Family: Colletidae
- Genus: Colletes
- Species: C. marginatus

Binomial name
- Colletes marginatus Smith, 1846

= Colletes marginatus =

Species of bee

Colletes marginatus is a species of solitary bee of the family Colletidae. The female only gather pollen from flowers of the family Fabaceae, including species like Trifolium arvense, Melilotus albus and Melilotus officinalis. It lives in coastal habitats such as dunes.
