= Colletes tectiventris =

Scientific classification
- Kingdom: Animalia
- Phylum: Arthropoda
- Clade: Pancrustacea
- Class: Insecta
- Order: Hymenoptera
- Family: Colletidae
- Genus: Colletes
- Species: C. tectiventris

Binomial name
- Colletes tectiventris Timberlake, 1951

Species of bee

Colletes tectiventris is a species of hymenopteran in the family Colletidae. It is found in North America.
