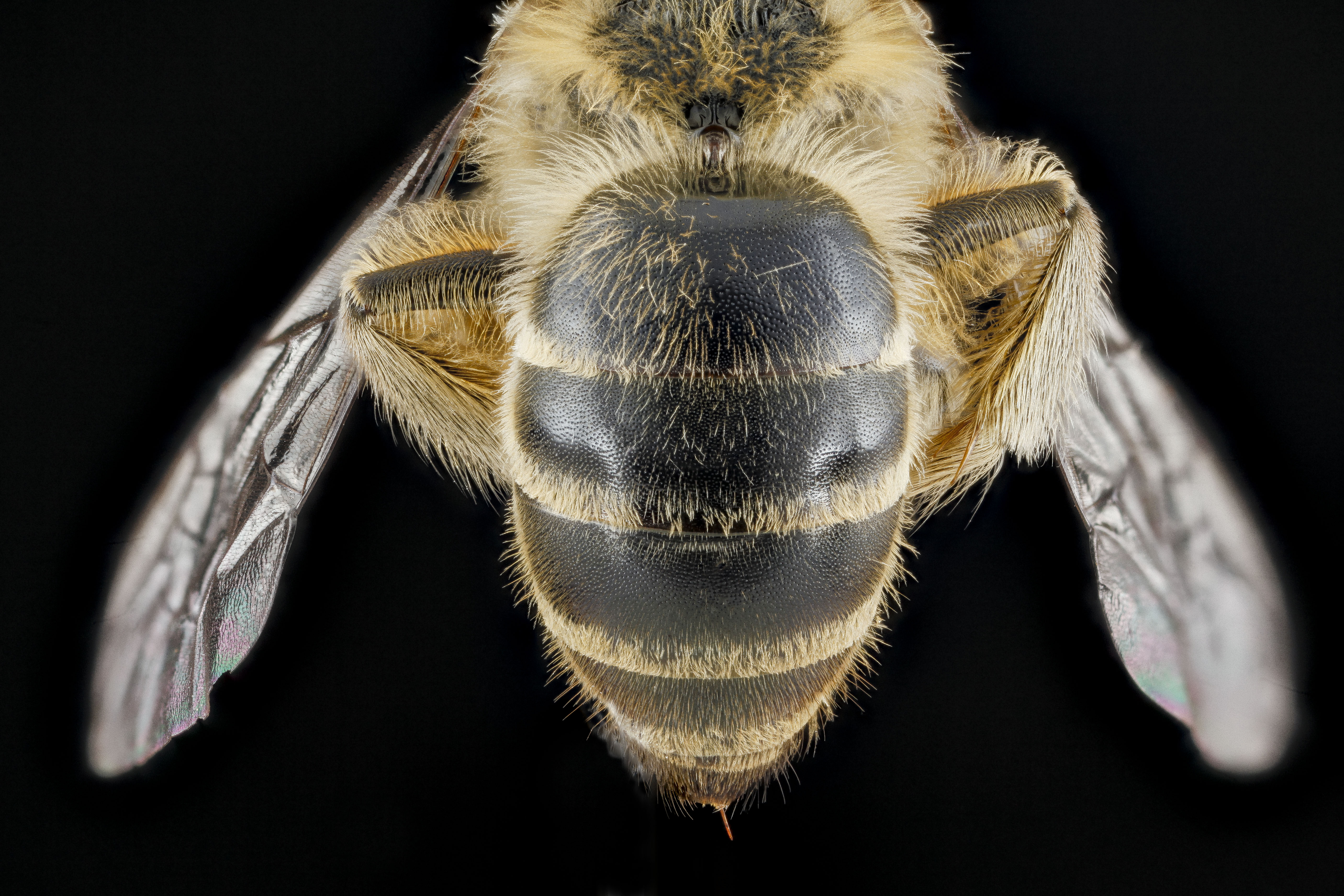
- Back of Colletes inaequalis female

Scientific classification
- Kingdom: Animalia
- Phylum: Arthropoda
- Clade: Pancrustacea
- Class: Insecta
- Order: Hymenoptera
- Family: Colletidae
- Genus: Colletes
- Species: C. inaequalis

Binomial name
- Colletes inaequalis Say, 1837

= Colletes inaequalis =

Species of bee

Colletes inaequalis is a common species of plasterer bee (family Colletidae), native to North America. Like other species in the genus, it builds cells in underground nests that are lined with a polyester secretion, earning the genus the nickname of polyester bees. C. inaequalis is a pollinator of red maple trees, willow trees, and apple trees.
