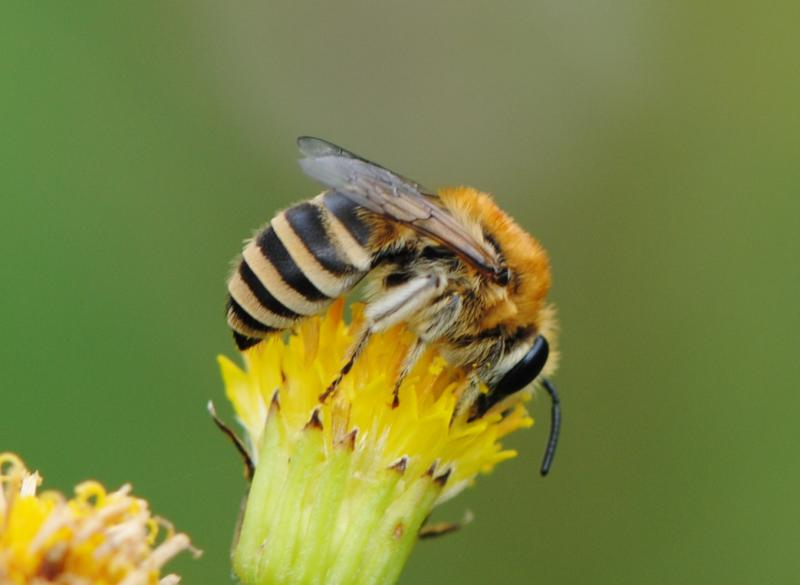
- Colletes fodiens Ermelo The Netherlands

Scientific classification
- Domain: Eukaryota
- Kingdom: Animalia
- Phylum: Arthropoda
- Class: Insecta
- Order: Hymenoptera
- Family: Colletidae
- Subfamily: Colletinae
- Genus: Colletes
- Species: C. fodiens

Binomial name
- Colletes fodiens (Geoffroy, 1785)

= Colletes fodiens =

Species of bee

Colletes fodiens is a Palearctic species of plasterer bee.
