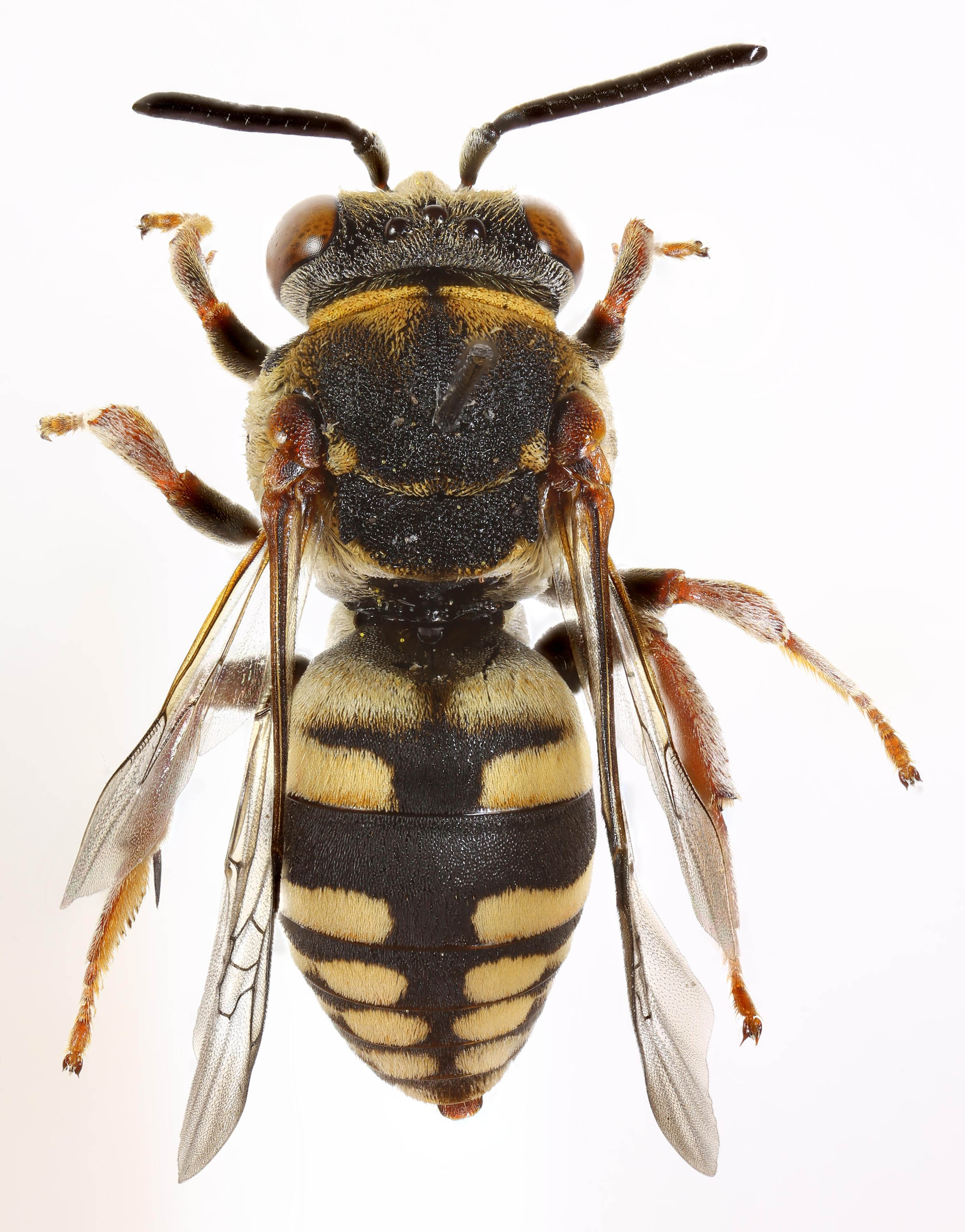

Conservation status
- Near Threatened (IUCN 3.1)

Scientific classification
- Kingdom: Animalia
- Phylum: Arthropoda
- Class: Insecta
- Order: Hymenoptera
- Family: Apidae
- Genus: Epeolus
- Species: E. cruciger

Binomial name
- Epeolus cruciger (Panzer, 1799)

Synonyms
- Nomada crucigera Panzer, 1799; Epeolus rufipes Thomson, 1870; Epeolus similis Höppner, 1899; Epeolus laevifrons Bischoff, 1930; Epeolus marginatus Bischoff, 1930

= Epeolus cruciger =

Species of bee

Epeolus cruciger, the red-thighed epeolus, is a species of cuckoo bee from the family Apidae. It is endemic to Europe, where its main host is the common colletes (Colletes succintus), although other species of Colletes mining bees have been recorded as hosts.

== Description ==
Epeolus cruciger is a small bee in which the females have a reddish scutellum and tend to have entirely red legs. The fifth sternite is straight when viewed from the side and from below it is noticeably wider than it is long. The abdomen is nearly completely reddish. The males have a dark scutellum (scutellum dark) usually have a reddish pygidium. The abdomen is black with large, paired whitish patches of flattened hair on each side. They are 6-8mm in length.

== Distribution ==
Epeolus cruciger is found in southern and central Europe as far north as Finland and is thought to be endemic to Europe. In Britain it is widespread in the southern part but becomes scarcer in the north, with one old unconfirmed record. and a more recent confirmed record in Scotland, both from Ayrshire. It is absent from Ireland. In the Netherlands it is found in the coastal dune systems while a population in the Delft estuary which was recorded for the first time in 2006 proved to be temporary and subsequently died out. However, in Belgium, there have been records of E. cruciger at least since the 1950s.

== Habitat ==
Epeolus cruciger is found in inland heaths, moorland, dunes systems, sandpits and undercliffs. Its main host Colletes succintus uses ling (Calluna vulgaris) as its principal food plant, so this shrub is an important element in the habitat for E. cruciger.

== Biology ==
Epeolus cruciger is univoltine with a flight period from the end of June to late September. It is a cleptoparasite on the nests of Colletes succintus, although other hosts in the genus Colletes have been recorded, but these have not been confirmed. The adults have been recorded foraging for nectar on the flowers of clover (Trifolium spp.), hawkbits (Leontodon sp.), ling (Calluna vulgaris), mint (Mentha), ragwort (Senecio jacobaea), sheep's-bit (Jasione montana), tansy (Tanacetum vulgare). There are no records of parasites or predators for E. cruciger.

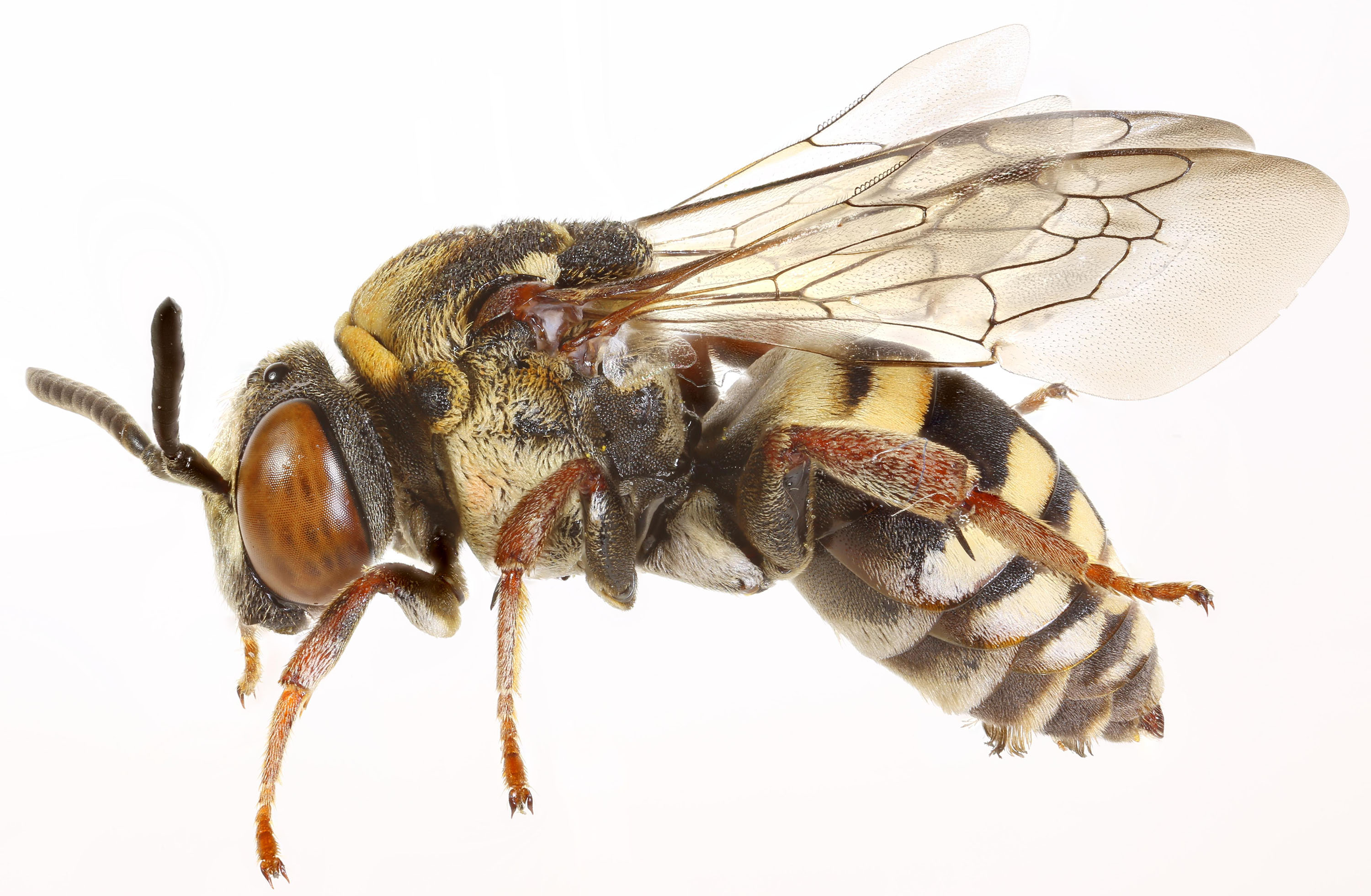
side view

== Conservation status ==
Epeolus cruciger is classified as near threatened by the International Union for Conservation of Nature but in Britain it is not regarded as rare or threatened and in the Netherlands it is regarded as not threatened with a stable population. but in Germany it is on the national red list as Category V.

== Taxonomy ==
Epeolus cruciger may be a lot of species with a distinct population which has an earlier flight period and is smaller in size, which utilises Colletes marginatus as a host, which may be a species in its own right, Epeolus marginatus. There is also a population in northern Italy which uses the ivy bee Colletes hederae, a species very closely related to C. succintus, as a host, and has remained restricted to what is thought to have been its glacial refuge, while its host has spread into other parts of Europe as far apart as southern England and Cyprus.
