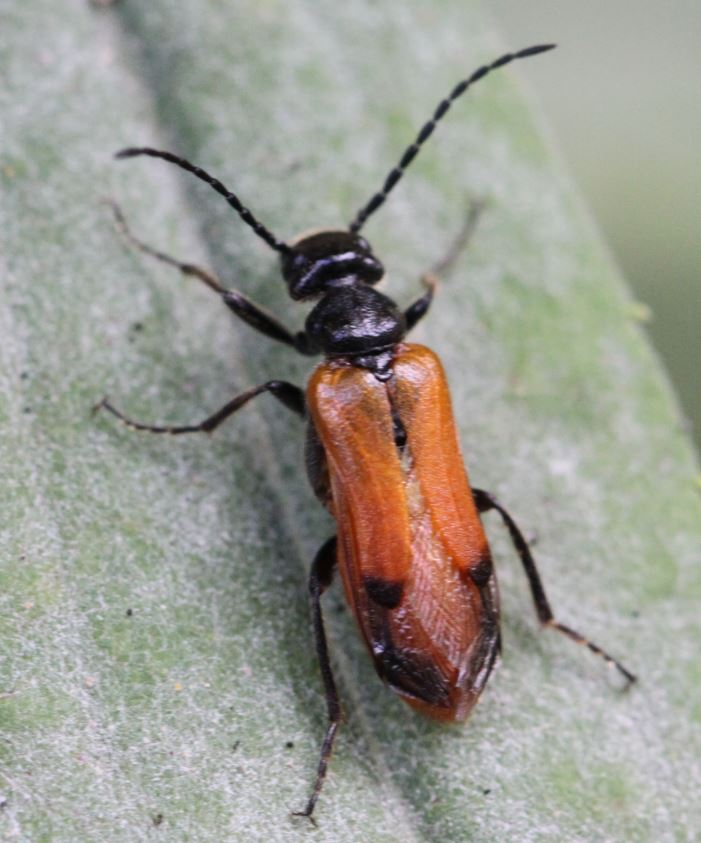

Scientific classification
- Kingdom: Animalia
- Phylum: Arthropoda
- Clade: Pancrustacea
- Class: Insecta
- Order: Coleoptera
- Suborder: Polyphaga
- Infraorder: Cucujiformia
- Family: Meloidae
- Genus: Stenoria
- Species: S. analis

Binomial name
- Stenoria analis Schaum, 1859

Synonyms
- Sitaris adusta Schaum, 1859; Sitaris colletis Mayet, 1873; Sitaris acutipennis Fairmaire, 1881

= Stenoria analis =

Species of beetle

Stenoria analis, the ivy bee blister beetle, is a species of blister beetle from the family Meloidae which is found in western Europe and North Africa and is a specialist cleptoparasite of the ivy bee (Colletes hederae) larvae. Its occurrence in regions outside of the known range of the ivy bee, for example in North Africa, suggest that it has other hosts.

== Description ==
Stenoria analis is a small beetle which is coloured black and buff. These beetles fly in sunny weather with a swift flight which resembles that of bees and wasps.

== Distribution ==
Stenoria analis is a species ranging from southern Europe and North Africa as far north as southern Germany and the Channel island of Jersey, and as far east as Silesia in Poland in the north, and southern Russia and Anatolia in the south. In western Europe the only known host for S. analis was Colletes hederae, which does not occur in areas such as North Africa or Anatolia, so it was postulated that there were hosts other than Colletes hederae. Larvae were recorded from males of Colletes succintus in France. As Colletes hederae spreads north in western Europe S. analis has followed, and has been recorded from new areas in Germany; it is expected to colonise southern Great Britain, where the ivy bee has successfully colonised since 2001.

== Biology and Life cycle ==
The female Stenoria analis lays her eggs on plants near to aggregations of ivy bees soon after mating, which has been recorded as occurring in low vegetation. The females lay clutches which consist of at least 117 eggs. As the eggs develop the changes within the egg can be easily observed, the changes becoming more obvious as the hatching of the larvae approaches. In Germany hatching occurs at the end of summer and takes between 15 and 24 days. The larvae that hatch from the eggs are small and have three claws and are so referred to as triungulins.

Patrolling ivy bees are attracted to aggregations of the triungulins and hover in front of them in a manner similar to that which they use to approach emergent female ivy bees. The males attempt copulation, a behaviour known as pseudocopulation, with the clusters of triungilins which allow small groups of the larvae to move onto the male bee's thorax. Larger groups of triungulins were exclusively found on the thorax of male bees and it has been proposed that the triungulins of S. analis mimic the female pheromones of its host species.

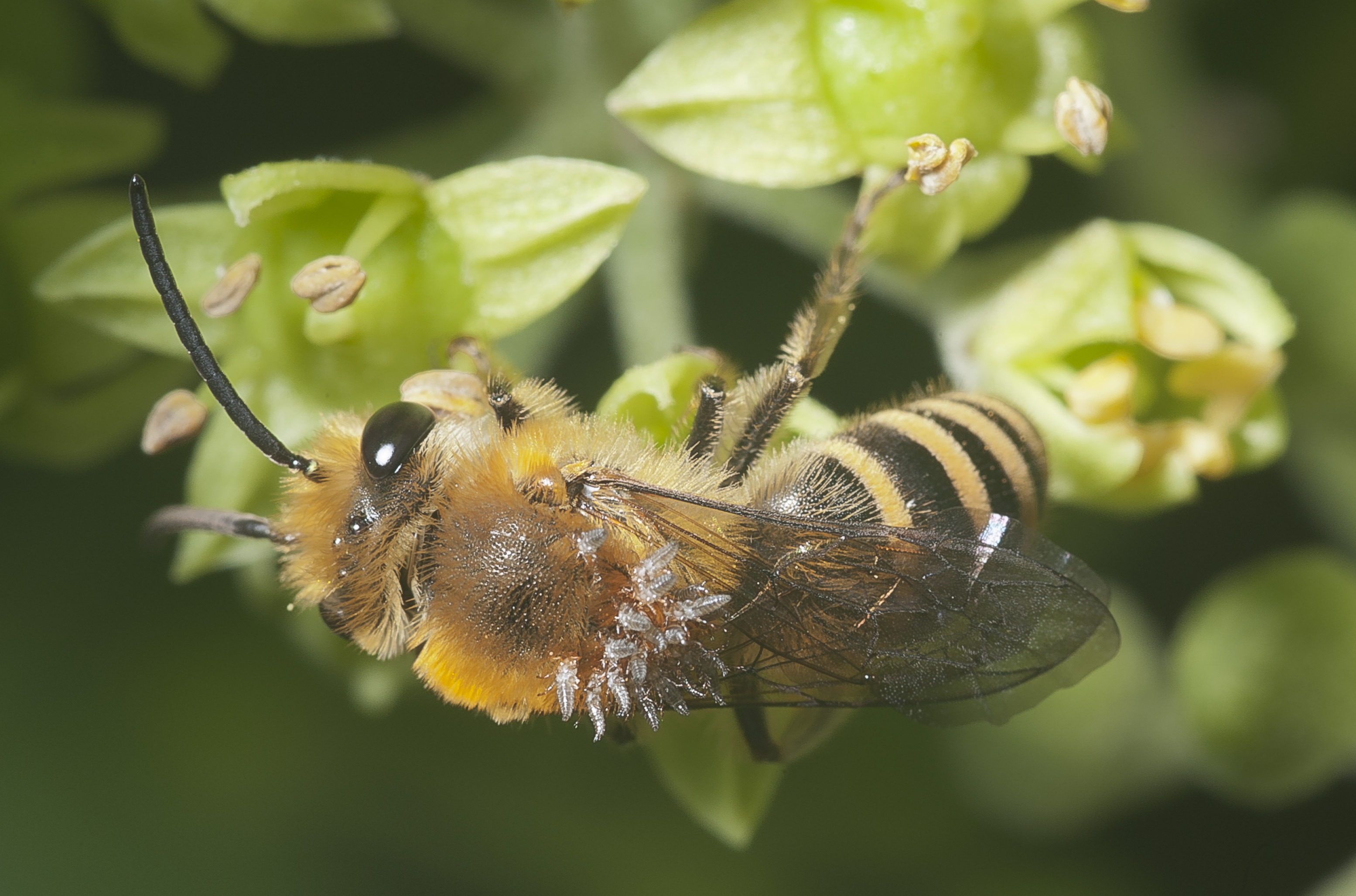
Colletes hederae parasitized by triungilims of Stenoria analis

Initially the larvae form a rather disorganised clump but after a day, the clump reorganises itself to that the brown heads of the larvae point outwards and the larvae become very active. When gently brushed, some of the larvae will garn on to the hairs of the brush, clinging on to the brush, as they do to a host bee, with their feet each of which has a curved claw and two curved bristles. This larval stage also has strong jaws which they use when the larvae are attached to their host by their feet and are unable to use their claws. Male ivy bees, normally hatch before the females, and usually they remain a few centimetres above the ground in the close vicinity of the nesting aggregation where they conduct search flights for females. Once a female bee is detected the males react very strongly. So that the triungulins are able to transfer to a bee they need to bring them close. As pheromones are important in bees in the recognition of the sexes, it is possible that blister beetle triungilins are able to chemically mimic bee pheromones to attract their hosts. This may be combined with optical mimicry, where the larval cluster with their brown heads facing outwards may mimic the appearance of female bees, an impression that may be reinforced by the larvae's movement which may imitate the movement of a female bee to the males.

The male bees then mate with newly emerged female bees and the triungilins transfer onto the mated females who transport them back to the nest chambers. The beetle larvae then attach themselves to the cell wall and then let themselves be sealed into the cell. It is then thought that they act like other blister beetles and initially consume the bee's egg before consuming the pollen supply of pollen left by the female bee as provisions for the bee grubs. The consistency of the honey produced by each bee species is important, too liquid and the larvae may drown and too thick and it may starve. S. analis prefers the nests of Colletes but has also been found in nests of bees of the genus Andrena. Only one triungilin is found per cell, if two occur then one kills the other.

A few days layer, the triongulin metamorphoses into the secondary larva, developing a soft, thick body enabling it to float on the honey while it feeds on it. It continues to grow and after two instars it emerges as an obese larva which looks like a large white grub. It keeps on consuming the until near the end of April it becomes a pseudonymph undergoing a final moult, and ceases to feed, becoming immobile within the shed cuticles, exuvia, of the previous instars. This instar is different to the previous instars by possessing the signs of the adult organs. Initially white the nymph slowly gets darker until it emerges as an imago in around 10 days after the final moult. The new imago remains immobile for a few days before ripping itself out of the various membranes surrounding it and exiting the cell, into the open in the following summer.
