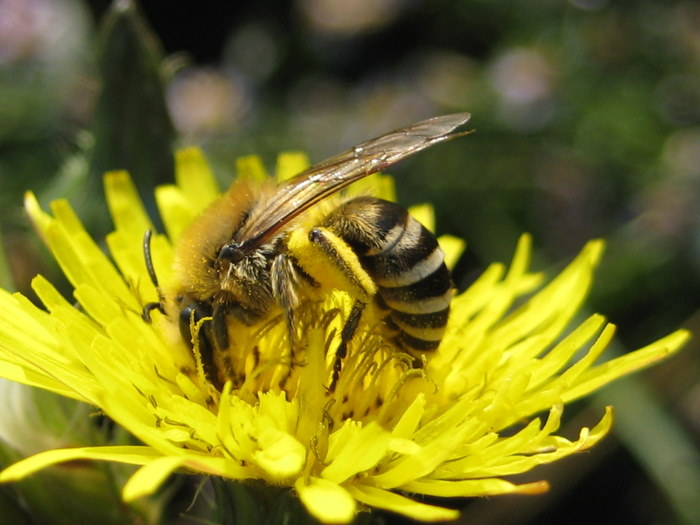

Conservation status
- Near Threatened (IUCN 3.1)

Scientific classification
- Kingdom: Animalia
- Phylum: Arthropoda
- Clade: Pancrustacea
- Class: Insecta
- Order: Hymenoptera
- Family: Colletidae
- Genus: Colletes
- Species: C. halophilus

Binomial name
- Colletes halophilus Verhoeff, 1944

= Colletes halophilus =

Species of bee

Colletes halophilus, the sea aster mining bee, is a rare species of mining bee from the family Colletidae which is found around the margins of saltmarsh and other coastal habitats in south-eastern England and north-western Europe. It is threatened by rising sea levels and human development which reduce its food plant sea aster (Aster tripolium) and destroy its nesting areas.

== Description ==
Colletes halophilus is a striking short-tongued mining bee which has its thorax coated with reddish brown hair, and a black abdomen with contrasting pale whitish to yellow bands. The females are larger and brighter than the males. C. halophilus adults have a length of 11–14 mm. There are two similar western European bee species—the ivy bee (Colletes hederae) and the common colletes (Colletes succintus)—but these are ecologically separated from C. halophilus.

== Distribution ==
Colletes halophilus has a highly restricted distribution, being found in coastal eastern England from Spurn Point southward along the east coast past the Thames Estuary, and along the south coast as far as Hampshire and easternmost Dorset. In 2026, it was sighted in Somerset in western England for the first time, with the Wildlife and Wetlands Trust attributing the expansion of its range to the success of a saltmarsh restoration project in Steart Marshes.

Outside England, C. halophilus has a restricted distribution on the Atlantic coastal regions of western Europe, from the Frisian Islands in the north to the Bay of Biscay coasts of south western France.

== Habitat ==
C. halophilus is strongly associated with saltmarshes. The nesting aggregations are situated at the inland edges of the saltmarshes out of the reach of all but the highest tides and close to sources of food. The sites chosen for nests are usually bare sandy soils, which are warmer than the surrounding vegetated areas due to exposure to the sun, often placed on south-facing slopes. As well as natural habitats, C. halophilus uses manmade habitats such as former industrial or brownfield sites, sea walls, and piles of sand.

== Biology ==
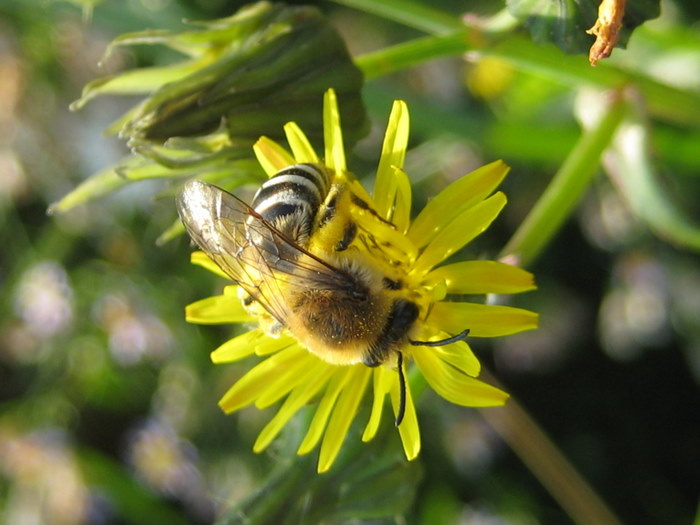
Colletes halophilus

Colletes halophilus are "solitary bees", but they nest in aggregations, which can sometimes number in the thousands. They nest in bare soil—for example, where vegetation has been removed by land slips—in soil heaps, and even in and around the burrows of European rabbits. The nesting sites are located at the edge of saltmarshes and may occasionally be flooded by the highest spring tides; bees have been observed emerging from recently submerged mud. Each female digs her own burrow, creates the cells, and provisions them on her own. Each nest consists of a short, curved burrow which terminates in a cluster of around half a dozen cells which radiate around the end of the shaft. The males sometimes form roosts; such roosts may consist of as many as a dozen individuals resting on grass stems.

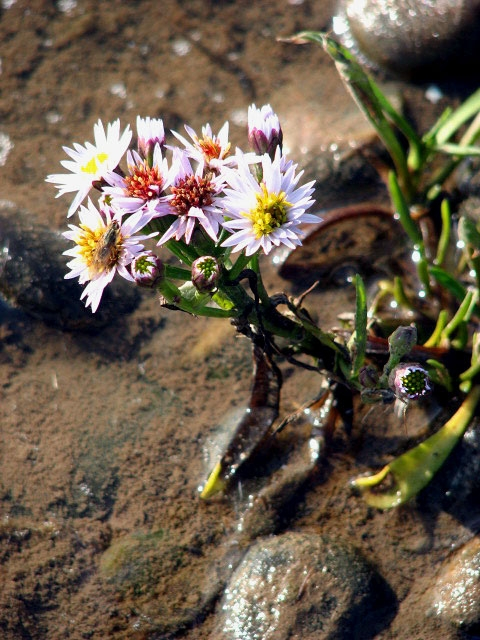
Sea Aster, the main food plant of Colletes halophilus

They are active from the late summer, sometimes as early as July, with the males emerging first and stay close to the emergence site where they scout for females to mate with. When a female emerges, the males swarm towards her and attempt to mate; they may form a "mating ball" with many males surrounding a single female. Once mated, the females begin to excavate their burrows, lining the walls of the burrows with a glandular secretion which hardens and acts as an anti-fungal defence. Each cell is provisioned with pollen and nectar, mainly collected from the flowers of the sea aster, and the bee's flight period is timed to coincide with the flowering period of sea aster.

The late summer emergence of the adults of C. halophilus mean that this species is univoltine, and the bees overwinter in their natal cells to emerge the following summer as adults to begin the life cycle again. The bees feed on a limited range of plants, mostly in the Asteraceae, including weld (Reseda luteola), but sea aster is especially important. Both males and females need to feed on pollen to power their flight, and it is important that the nesting aggregations are located close to sources of food. C. halophilus is parasitized by the cuckoo bee Epeolus variegatus which takes over the nests of the mining bee, including the food provisions, and times its emergence to coincide with C halophilus. Another parasite is the sarcophagid fly Miltogramma punctata which has been reared from puparia taken from nests of C. halophilus and observed flying around nest entrances.

== Conservation ==
Colletes halophilus is classified as "Near Threatened" by the International Union for Conservation of Nature and European Commission and is listed as nationally notable in Great Britain and is on the National Red List in Germany. It has a small overall population made up of dispersed and isolated sub-populations which are threatened by habitat destruction, coastal management, and urban and infrastructure development of its habitat, nesting sites, and host plants. It may also be threatened by rising sea levels induced by climate change. It does occur in a number of protected areas.

C. halophilus will readily use manmade sites, and this means that conservation efforts can also involve creating suitable nesting sites. One of the largest nesting aggregations in England is in a former aggregates yard where the bees nest in a large artificial mound of sand. Even on a small scale, land managers can create bare patches close to food sources for the bees to nest in by cutting the vegetation very short to expose bare soil. In one instance, bare areas of soil were scraped out between rows of asters and were colonised by the bees, while on a larger scale, bulldozers have been used to scrape the soil free of the vegetation.
