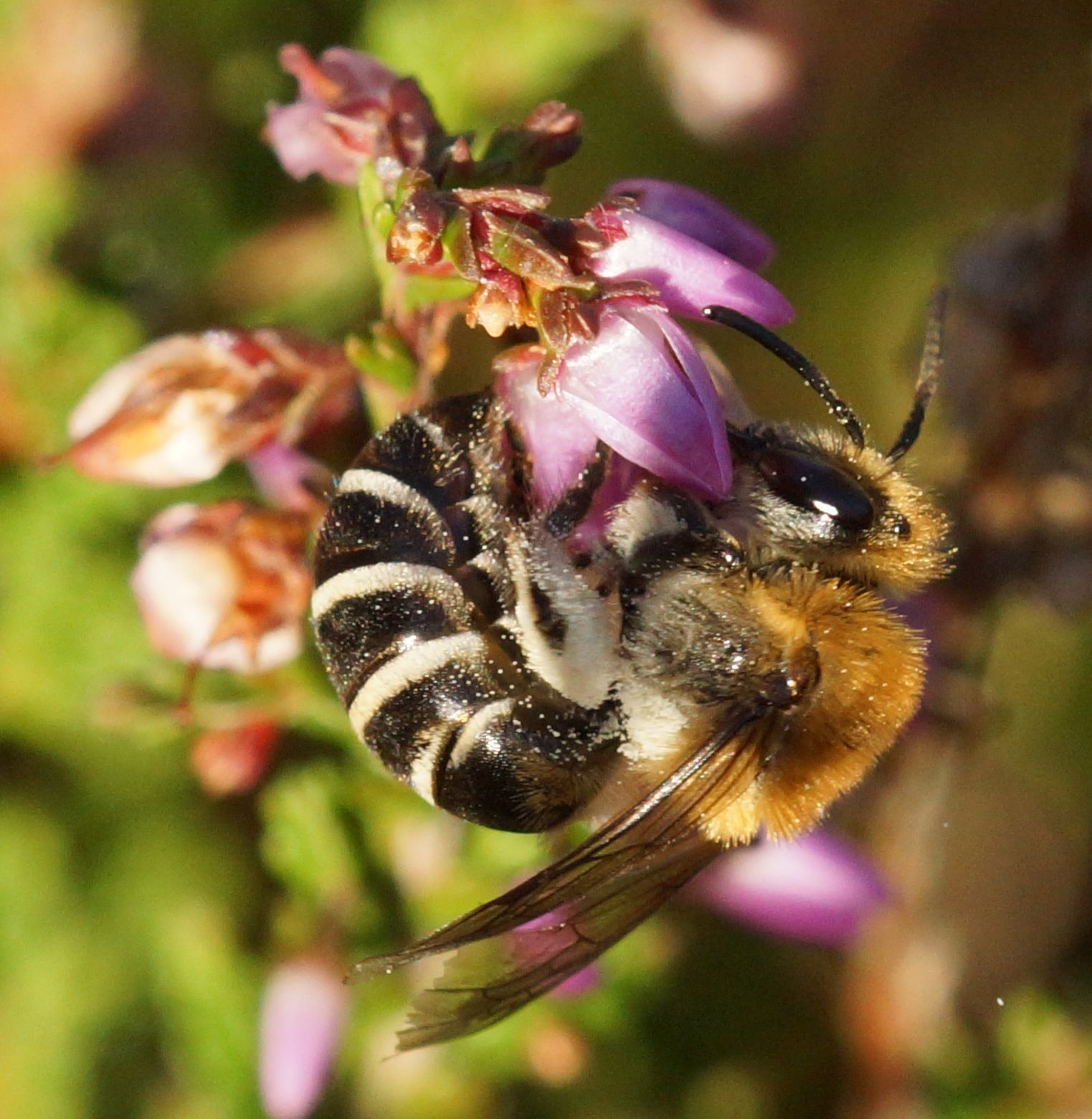
- female

Scientific classification
- Kingdom: Animalia
- Phylum: Arthropoda
- Class: Insecta
- Order: Hymenoptera
- Family: Colletidae
- Genus: Colletes
- Species: C. succinctus

Binomial name
- Colletes succinctus (Linnaeus, 1758)

Synonyms
- Apis succinctus Linnaeus, 1758; Apis fuliginosa Scopoli, 1770; Apis invictus Harris, 1776; Apis glutinans Cuvier, 1798; Apis calendarum Panzer, 1806; Colletes balteatus Nylander, 1852; Colletes kervillei Perez, 1908; Andrena xanthothorax Eversmann, 1852

= Colletes succinctus =

Species of bee

Colletes succinctus, the common colletes or heather colletes, is a species of Palearctic mining bee from the family Colletidae. It is part of the succinctus species group within the genus Colletes and is especially closely related to the ivy bee (Colletes hederae) and the sea aster mining bee (Colletes halophilus) which are partially sympatric with C. succinctus but ecologically separate.

== Description ==
Colletes succinctus is a medium-sized bee which has pale hairs on its clypeus and pale transverse bands on the thorax but with an orange, transparent band on the first tergite. It is similar to two rare related species, the ivy bee (C. hederae) and the sea aster mining bee (C. halophilus), both of which were identified as separate species from C. succinctus in 1993 and 1943 respectively. They are all, however, separated from each other by their ecology. C. succinctus measures 10mm in length.

== Distribution ==
Colletes succinctus is a widespread bee occurring from the southern part of Ireland and from Portugal east through Europe into Asia, south to Iran and as far east as Tibet. In Britain it is widespread as far north as Orkney. In the southern part of its distribution it becomes more localised and is replaced by other closely related species, for example it is absent from North Africa where it appears to be replaced by Colletes intricans, another member of the succinctus species group.

== Habitat ==
Colletes succinctus is found on heathland and moorland in Britain and also in Europe where there are also some populations which occur among maritime dunes and on beaches.

== Biology ==
Colletes succinctus nest in aggregations which in most of its range are quite small and can be difficult to locate C. succinctus as the females will nest singly or in small groups but in northern England and Scotland they may form large, dense aggregations of nests, with one aggregation recorded in North Yorkshire made up of 60–80,000 nests which were counted along 100m of river bank. In such dense aggregations the nests can be separated by just a few centimetres. They are univoltine and the flight period is July to October. In the early part of the fight period the males swarm around the aggregation and try to mate with emerging females. Sometimes a number of males will surround a single female and they will roll around on the ground until one of the males successfully mates with the female. Once the females have mated they start to dig their short burrows and create cells with walls made of a thin and transparent material which resembles cellophane in appearance and which is formed from a secretion produced in the Dufour's gland located in the bee's abdomen.

The main food plants are heathers, especially ling Calluna vulgaris and the females have been recorded travelling up to 1.5 km from the nest to collect pollen to provision the cells. They have also been recorded foraging on Erica, ivy and Asteraceae as well as melilot (Melilotus sp.), yarrow (Achillea millefolia) and creeping thistle (Cirsium arvense). In Spain it has also been recorded feeding on Daphne gnidium and dwarf gorse (Ulex minor). Alternative pollen sources to Calluna vulgaris are mainly used once the pollen of that species starts to run low in late summer.

=== Parasites and predators ===
Colletes succinctus nests are commonly cleptoparasitized by the cuckoo bee Epeolus cruciger. They may also be parasitized by the sarcophagid fly Miltogramma punctata while adults have been recorded as being predated by the crabronid wasp Cerceris rybyensis.

== Taxonomy and phylogeny ==
Colletes succinctus is a member of the succinctus species complex within the genus Colletes. There are 12 species which are currently assigned to the succinctus species group which includes the Mediterranean species Colletes intricans from North Africa as well as C. collaris and C. brevigena from more southerly areas of Europe. The three western European species C. halophilus, C. hederae and C. succinctus appear to be particularly closely related, so much so that the former two were only identified as separate species from C. succinctus in the 20th Century. They are almost indistinguishable from each other both phenotypically and genetically but are separated ecologically. The oldest species is thought to be C. succinctus and the distribution of this species closely matches that of its food plant. It is also parasitized by the cuckoo bee Epeolus cruciger with which it is largely sympatric.

The other two species have distributions which lie within that of C. succinctus and do not closely match the distributions of their food plants while the cuckoo bee E. cruciger still uses them as hosts but it does not do so with the efficiency that it does with C. succinctus. This strongly suggests that C. succinctus is the "parent" of C. halophilus ad C. hederae and that these two species arose from populations of C. succinctus isolated in glacial refugia during the last glaciation, probably in Iberia for C. halophilus and in northern Italy for C. hederae. It is further postulated that the new species were probably expanding their ranges to exploit new populations of their foodplants and this can still be seen in the colonisation of southern Britain by C. hederae in the 1990s and its expansion in Bavaria. This hypothesis is further supported by the evidence that E. cruciger only parasitizes C. hederae south of the Alps and probably represents a localised and specialised "race" of E. cruciger which has not been able to expand its distribution as its host has done.
