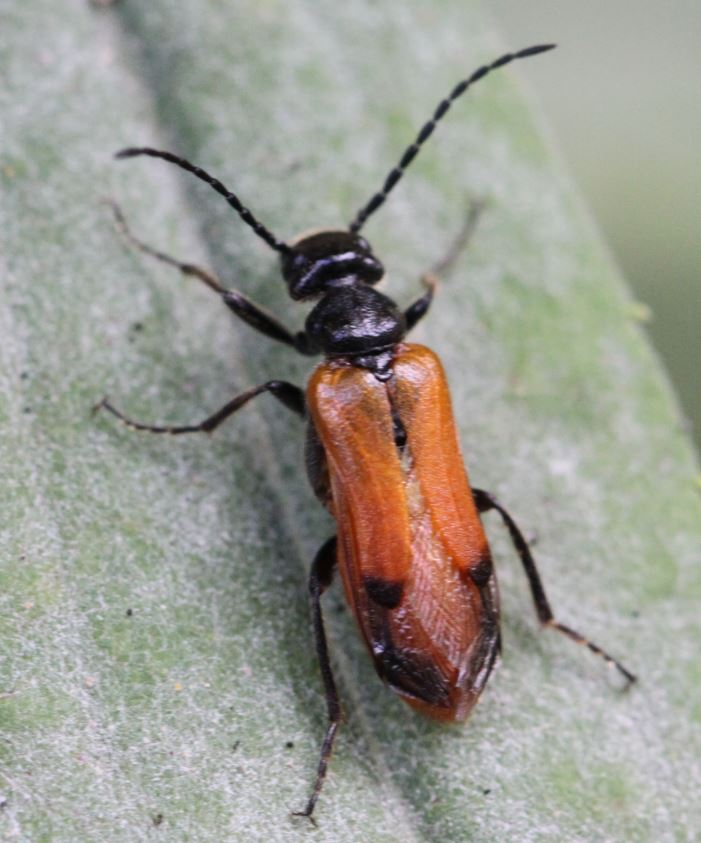
- Stenoria analis

Scientific classification
- Kingdom: Animalia
- Phylum: Arthropoda
- Class: Insecta
- Order: Coleoptera
- Suborder: Polyphaga
- Infraorder: Cucujiformia
- Family: Meloidae
- Subfamily: Nemognathinae
- Tribe: Sitarini
- Genus: Stenoria; Mulsant, 1857

Type species
- Sitaris apicalis Latreille, 1804

= Stenoria =

Genus of beetles

Stenoria is a genus of blister beetles from the family Meloidae. Their larvae develop as parasitoids and brood parasites of the larvae of solitary bees of the families Megachilidae, Colletidae and Andrenidae. The genus contains more than 50 species They are found in the Palearctic from the Canary Islands east to Afghanistan, Tibet and north western China, and also in southern and eastern Africa.

== Species ==
The following species are among those included in the genus Stenoria:

- Stenoria analis Schaum, 1859 (ivy bee blister beetle)
- Sentoria apicalis (Latreille, 1804)
- Stenoria hessei Kaszab, 1953
- Sentoria laterimaculata (Reitter, 1898)
- Sentoria thakkola Shawaller, 1996
