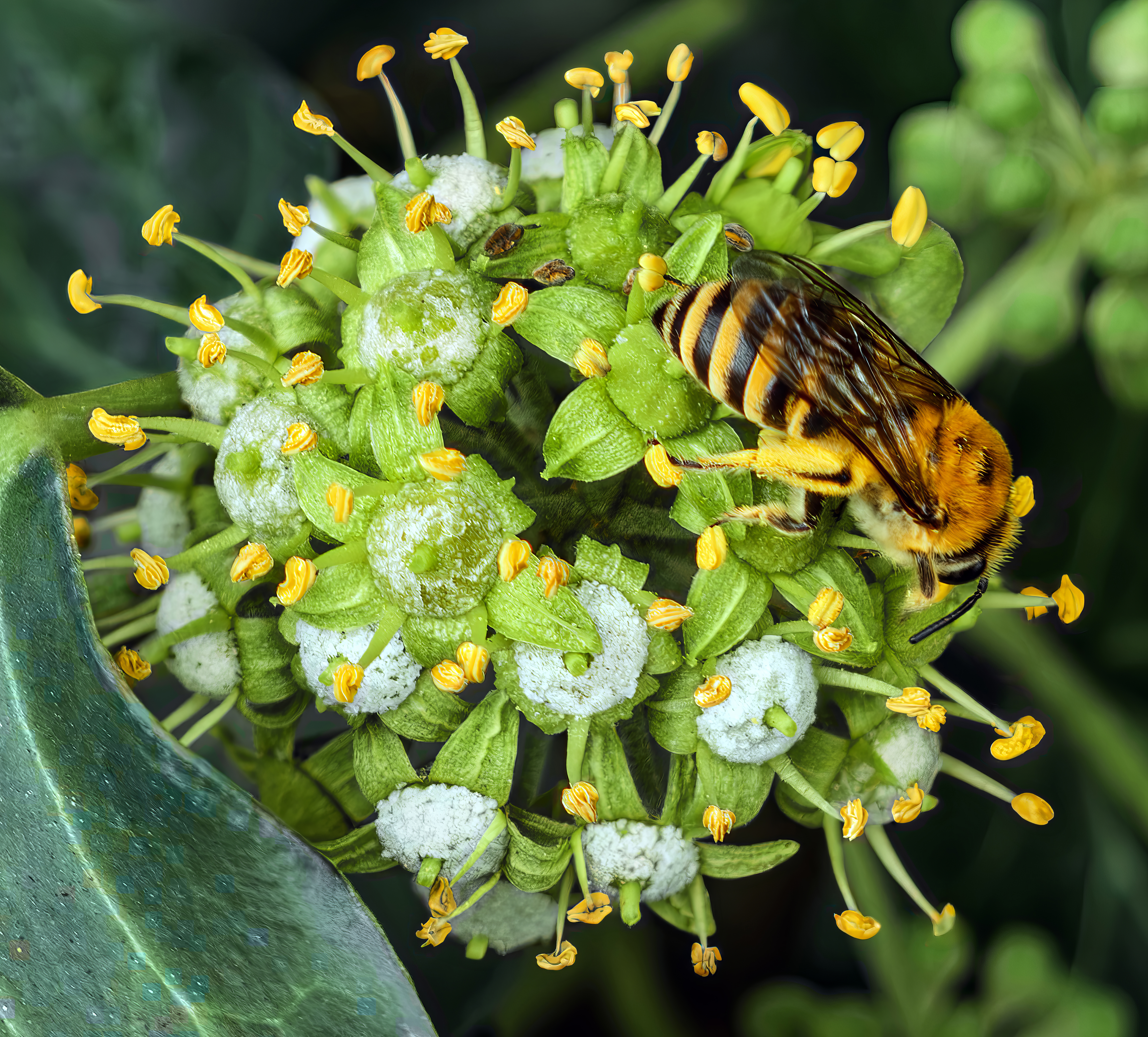
- female on Hederae inflorescence

Conservation status
- Least Concern (IUCN 3.1)

Scientific classification
- Kingdom: Animalia
- Phylum: Arthropoda
- Clade: Pancrustacea
- Class: Insecta
- Order: Hymenoptera
- Family: Colletidae
- Genus: Colletes
- Species: C. hederae

Binomial name
- Colletes hederae Schmidt & Westrich, 1993

= Colletes hederae =

Species of bee

Colletes hederae, the ivy bee, is a species of plasterer bee belonging to the family Colletidae subfamily Colletinae.

== Taxonomy ==
Colletes hederae has been only recently described (Schmidt & Westrich 1993) as a distinct species. Until then, they were confused with another species of Colletes that are morphologically similar, but ecologically distinctive, Colletes halophilus.

== Distribution ==
Ivy bees are known from Austria, Belgium, Channel Islands, Croatia, Cyprus, southern England, Wales, France, Germany, Greece, Ireland, Italy, Luxembourg, Netherlands, Serbia, Slovenia, Spain and Switzerland.

== Description ==
The females of Colletes hederae are on average 13 millimetres (0.51 in) long, while the males are about 10 mm (0.39 in) long, significantly larger than the common colletes. The thorax of the adults is covered by dense orange-brown hair, while each abdominal segment has an apical orangey hair-band.

This species is very similar to the closely related heather colletes (Colletes succinctus) and even more to the sea aster mining bee (Colletes halophilus).

== Biology ==
The adults emerge late in the year (the males from late August and the females a little later in early September) and remain on the wing until early November. The principal pollen forage plant is ivy (Hedera helix) (hence the specific epithet hederae), but both sexes will also nectar at ivy flowers too. When ivy is scarce, other species of plants are also visited. The females supply the larval brood cells almost exclusively with nectar and pollen of ivy flowers. When ivy flowering is delayed, females may also collect pollen at various members of the daisy family (Asteraceae).

C. hederae are solitary bees that do not live in colonies and do not overwinter as adults. They nest in clay-sandy soils, especially in loess hills and soft-rock cliffs. Like many other solitary bees, they can often be found nesting in dense aggregations, sometimes numbering many tens of thousands of nests. In parts of the west European range of the species, C. hederae are frequently parasitized by the larvae of the meloid beetle Stenoria analis, which feed on the supply of nectar and pollen prepared by females bees in their nests.

== Gallery ==
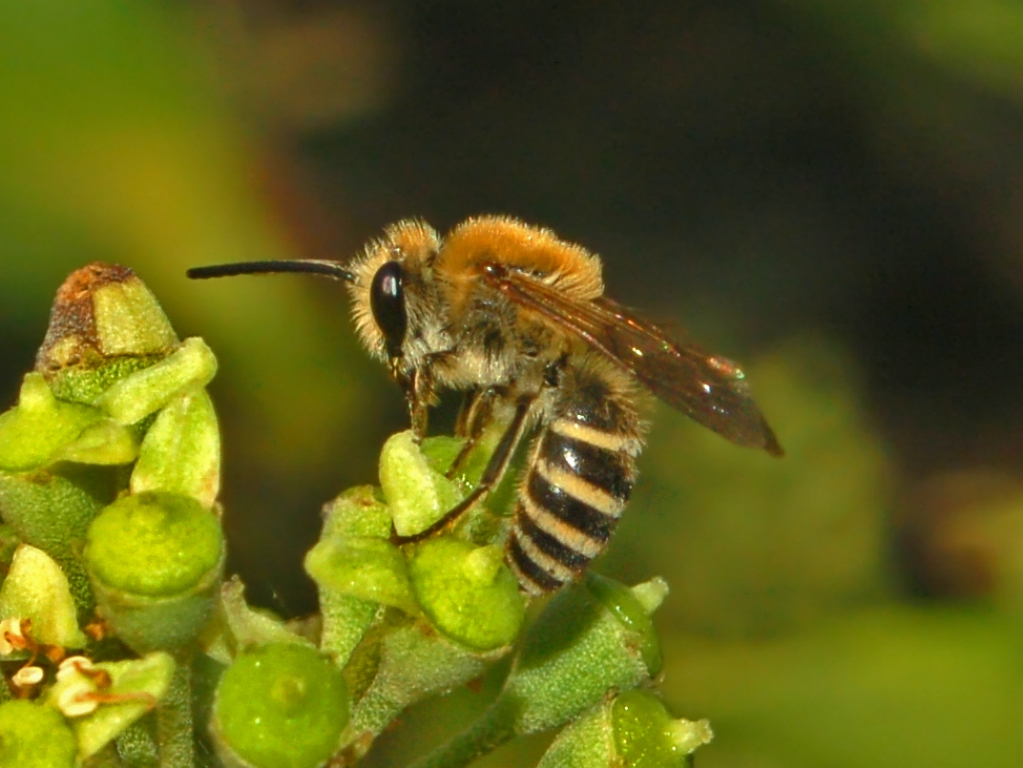
Male, feeding on Hedera helix

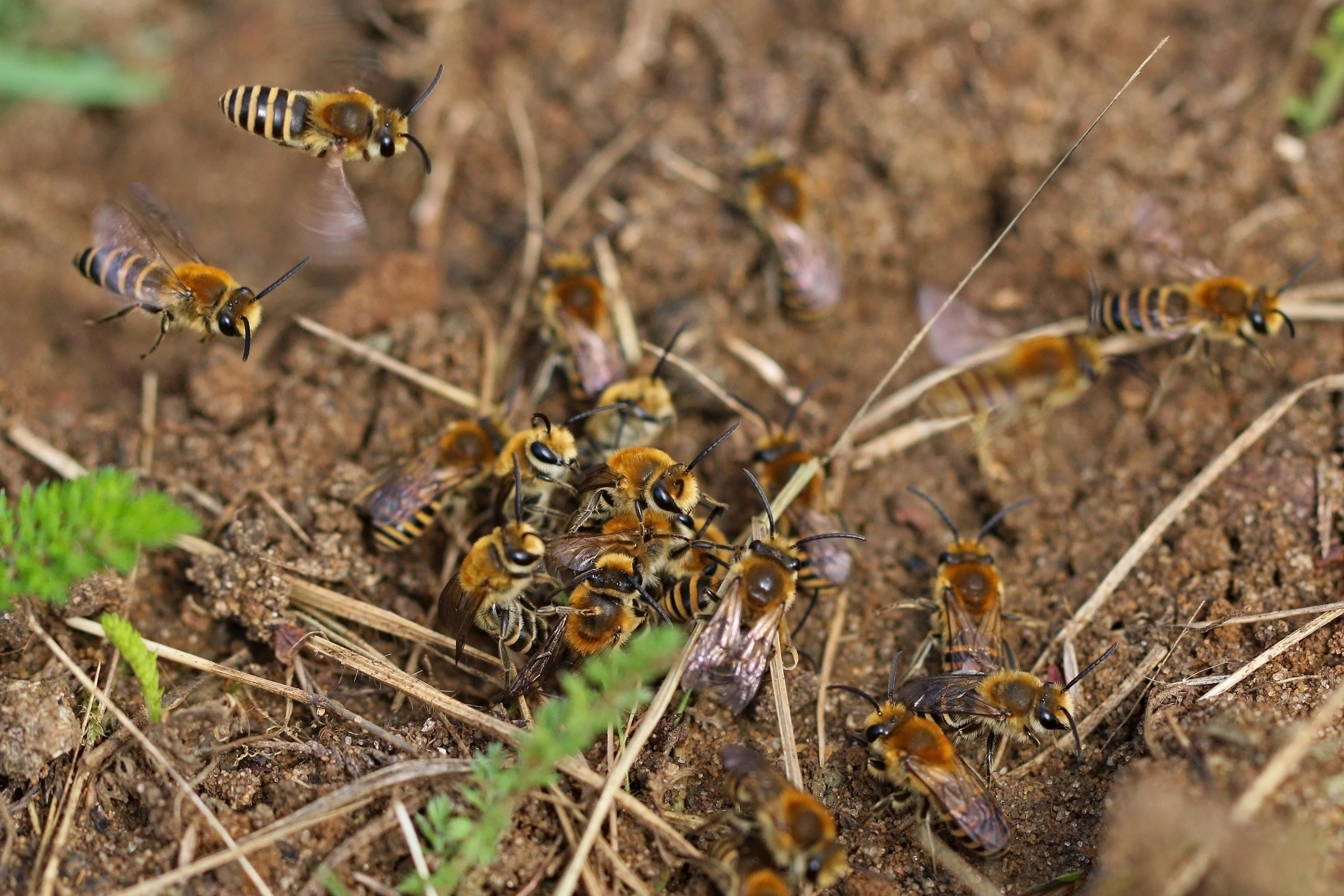
Males in a mating cluster

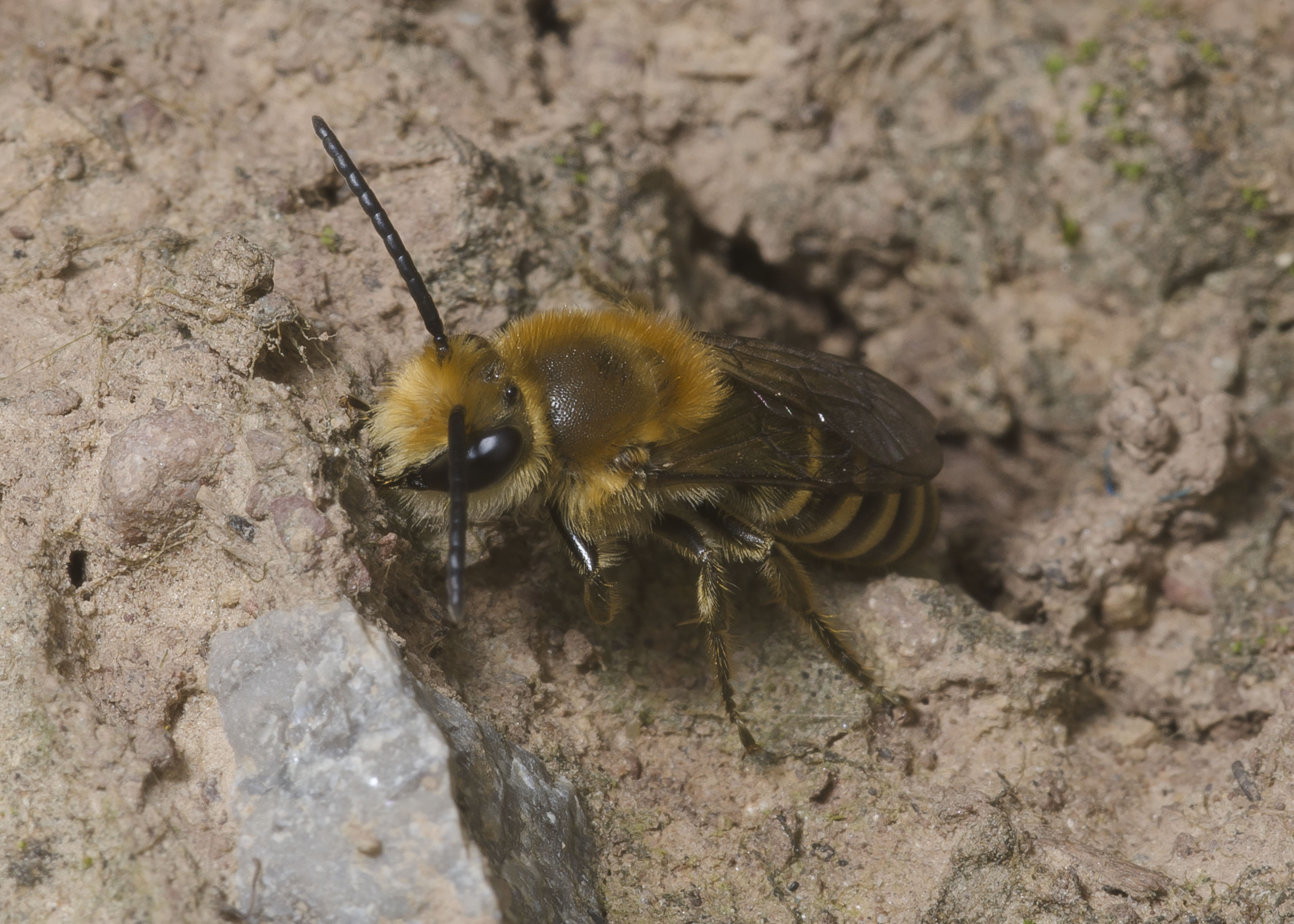
Male on the ground

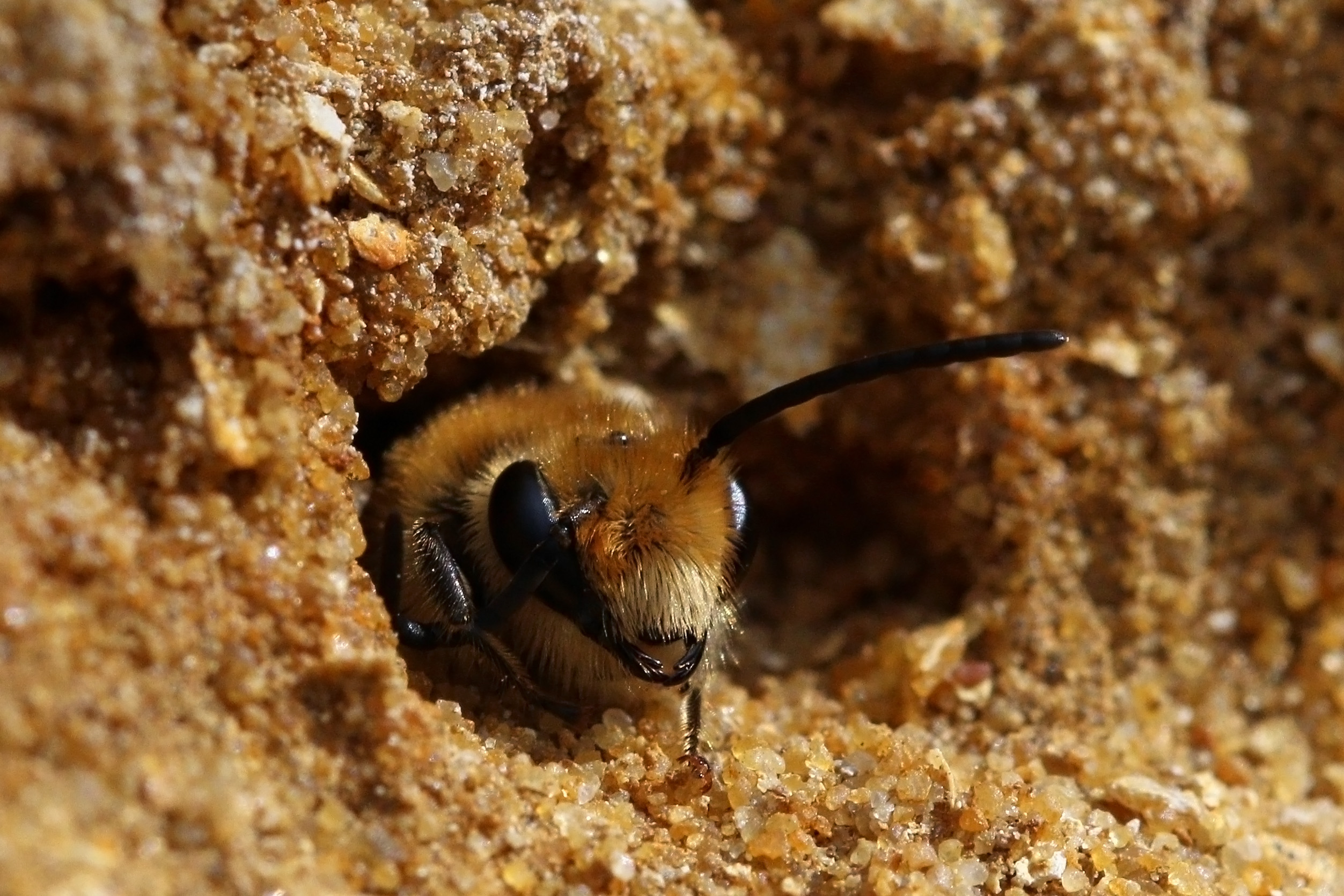
Male on guard

== Bibliography ==
- Gogala, A., 1999. Bee Fauna of Slovenia: Checklist of species (Hymenoptera: Apoidea). Scopolia, 42: 1-79.
- Peeters, T. M. J., I. P. Raemakers and J. Smit, 1999. Voorlopige atlas van de Nederlandse bijen (Apidae). European Invertebrate Survey Nederland, Leiden, 230 pp.
- Schmidt, K., & Westrich, P. 1993. Colletes hederae n.sp., eine bisher unerkannte auf Efeu (Hedera) spezialisierte Bienenart (Hymenoptera: Apoidea). Entomol. Z. 103 (6) pp. 89–112.
- Schwarz, M., F. Gusenleitner, P. Westrich and H. Dathe, 1996. Katalog der Bienen Österreichs, Deutschlands und der Schweiz (Hymenoptera, Apidae). Entomofauna Suppl. 8: 1-398.
- Westrich, P., 2008. Flexibles Pollensammelverhalten der ansonsten streng oligolektischen Seidenbiene Colletes hederae Schmidt & Westrich (Hymenoptera: Apidae). Eucera, Heft 2: pp 17–30
- Vereecken N. J. & Mahé G., 2007. Larval aggregations of the blister beetle Stenoria analis (Schaum) (Coleoptera: Meloidae) sexually deceive patrolling males of their host, the solitary bee Colletes hederae Schmidt & Westrich (Hymenoptera: Colletidae). Annales de la Société Entomologique de France
