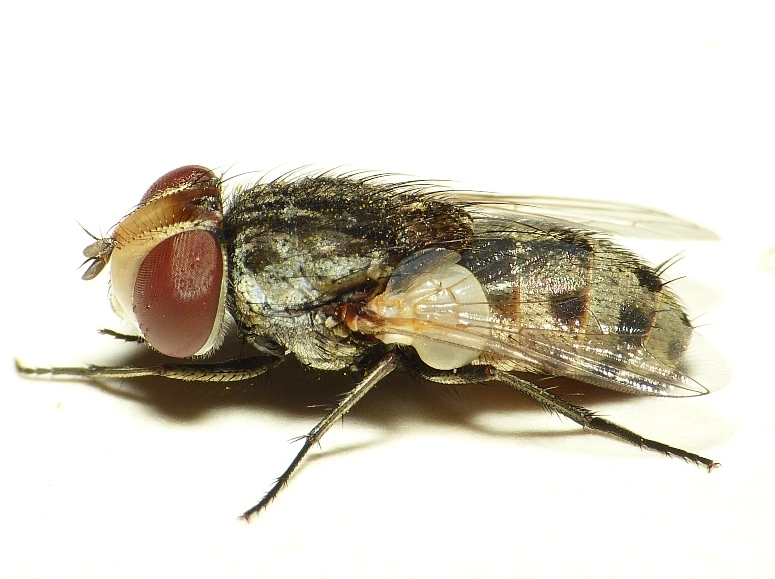

Scientific classification
- Kingdom: Animalia
- Phylum: Arthropoda
- Clade: Pancrustacea
- Class: Insecta
- Order: Diptera
- Family: Sarcophagidae
- Genus: Miltogramma
- Species: M. punctata

Binomial name
- Miltogramma punctata Meigen, 1824

= Miltogramma punctata =

Species of fly

Miltogramma punctata is a species of fly belonging to the family Sarcophagidae subfamily Miltogramminae. It occurs in Europe.

== Description ==
Miltogramma punctata is 5·5–9·5mm long. The tergites have three fixed brown spots near the hind margin. The third antennal segment is fuscous, and with only the extreme base orange red. The thorax is more greyish dusted shifting vittae. In the male the fourth segment of fore tarsus at the apex of the posterior surface with two tufts of long black bristles; the anterior surface with numerous setulose hairs.

== Biology ==
The larvae develop in nests of fossorial Hymenoptera, including Colletes. The adults occur mainly in sandy places, and may "shadow" the female Hymenoptera. The species occurs across Europe.
