= List of Anthophora species =

This is a list of 429 species in the genus Anthophora.

== Anthophora species ==
- Anthophora abjuncta Cockerell, 1922
- Anthophora abramowi Fedtschenko, 1875
- Anthophora abrochia Eardley & Brooks, 1989
- Anthophora abroniae Timberlake, 1937
- Anthophora abrupta Say, 1837
- Anthophora acutilabris Morawitz, 1880
- Anthophora adamsorum Brooks, 1988
- Anthophora aegyptiaca (Dalla Torre & Friese, 1895)
- Anthophora aeneiventris Hedicke, 1931
- Anthophora aestivalis (Panzer, 1801)
- Anthophora affabilis Cresson, 1878
- Anthophora affinis Brullé, 1832
- Anthophora aflabellata Gribodo, 1926
- Anthophora agama Radoszkowski, 1869
- Anthophora albata Cresson, 1876
- Anthophora albella Gussakovsky, 1935
- Anthophora albiceps Friese, 1917
- Anthophora albicilla Pérez, 1895
- Anthophora albifascies Alfken, 1936
- Anthophora albifronella Brooks, 1988
- Anthophora albitomentosa Eardley & Brooks, 1989
- Anthophora albobarbata Hedicke, 1936
- Anthophora albopicta Cockerell, 1917
- Anthophora albosignata (Friese, 1896)
- Anthophora albotibialis Wu, 2000
- Anthophora alfkenella Priesner, 1957
- Anthophora alluaudi Pérez, 1902
- Anthophora altaica Radoszkowski, 1882
- Anthophora alternans (Klug, 1845)
- Anthophora ambitiosa Alfken, 1935
- Anthophora amegilloides Wu, 2000
- Anthophora amseli Hedicke, 1936
- Anthophora andalusica Pérez, 1902
- Anthophora andicola Schrottky, 1911
- Anthophora angolensis (Dalla Torre, 1896)
- Anthophora anoplura Wu, 2000
- Anthophora antennalis Wu, 1988
- Anthophora antennata Wu, 1988
- Anthophora appletoni Cockerell, 1946
- Anthophora arabica Priesner, 1957
- Anthophora arctica Morawitz, 1883
- Anthophora arequipensis Brèthes, 1920
- Anthophora argyrospila Cockerell, 1938
- Anthophora arida Brooks, 1988
- Anthophora armata Friese, 1905
- Anthophora arthuri Cockerell, 1906
- Anthophora aschabadensis Radoszkowski, 1893
- Anthophora asiatica Morawitz, 1880
- Anthophora astragali Morawitz, 1878
- Anthophora atrata Cresson, 1865
- Anthophora atriceps Pérez, 1879
- Anthophora atricilla Eversmann, 1846
- Anthophora atroalba Lepeletier, 1841
- Anthophora auone Eardley & Brooks, 1989
- Anthophora auripes Morawitz, 1886
- Anthophora badia Wu, 2000
- Anthophora bahamensis Brooks, 1988
- Anthophora balassogloi (Radoszkowski, 1876)
- Anthophora balearica (Friese, 1896)
- Anthophora balneorum Lepeletier, 1841
- Anthophora barbipes Fedtschenko, 1875
- Anthophora basalis Smith, 1854
- Anthophora beijingensis (Wu, 1986)
- Anthophora belieri Sichel, 1869
- Anthophora biciliata Lepeletier, 1841
- Anthophora bifasciata Fedtschenko, 1875
- Anthophora bimaculata (Panzer, 1798)
- Anthophora bispinosa Cockerell, 1949
- Anthophora bisulca Pérez, 1895
- Anthophora blanda Pérez, 1895
- Anthophora bogdanowi Fedtschenko, 1875
- Anthophora bogutensis (Mariskovskaya, 1976)
- Anthophora boharti Brooks, 1988
- Anthophora bomboides Kirby, 1837
- Anthophora borealis Morawitz, 1864
- Anthophora brasiliana Urban & Melo, 2005
- Anthophora braunsiana Friese, 1905
- Anthophora caelebs Gribodo, 1924
- Anthophora calcarata Lepeletier, 1841
- Anthophora californica Cresson, 1869
- Anthophora candidifrons Cockerell, 1946
- Anthophora canescens Brullé, 1832
- Anthophora capistrata Cresson, 1878
- Anthophora carinulata Morawitz, 1886
- Anthophora caroli Pérez, 1895
- Anthophora centriformis Cresson, 1879
- Anthophora chinensis Friese, 1919
- Anthophora chulumani Urban & Melo, 2005
- Anthophora cincreus (Friese, 1896)
- Anthophora cinerascens Lepeletier, 1841
- Anthophora cinerithoracis Wu, 1982
- Anthophora citreostrigata Dours, 1868
- Anthophora clavicornis Fedtschenko, 1875
- Anthophora clavitarsa Wu, 1990
- Anthophora clessini Fedtschenko, 1875
- Anthophora cockerelli Timberlake, 1937
- Anthophora codentata Wu, 2000
- Anthophora columbariae Timberlake & Cockerell, 1937
- Anthophora concinna (Klug, 1845)
- Anthophora connexiformis Cockerell, 1917
- Anthophora coptognatha Timberlake, 1951
- Anthophora crassipes Lepeletier, 1841
- Anthophora crinipes Smith, 1854
- Anthophora croceitarsis Gussakovsky, 1935
- Anthophora crotchii Cresson, 1878
- Anthophora crysocnemis Morawitz, 1878
- Anthophora cunicularia Friese, 1914
- Anthophora curta Provancher, 1895
- Anthophora dalmatica Pérez, 1902
- Anthophora dammersi Timberlake, 1937
- Anthophora dentilabris Morawitz, 1894
- Anthophora deserticola Morawitz, 1873
- Anthophora desertorum Gussakovsky, 1935
- Anthophora dispar Lepeletier, 1841
- Anthophora disparilis Friese, 1922
- Anthophora diversipes Friese, 1922
- Anthophora dorsalis Vachal, 1909
- Anthophora doursiana (Friese, 1897)
- Anthophora dubia Eversmann, 1852
- Anthophora dufourii Lepeletier, 1841
- Anthophora eburnea Radoszkowski, 1876
- Anthophora edwardsii Cresson, 1878
- Anthophora ekuivensis Cockerell, 1908
- Anthophora elbana Priesner, 1957
- Anthophora epichariformis Gribodo, 1893
- Anthophora erschowi Fedtschenko, 1875
- Anthophora erubescens Morawitz, 1880
- Anthophora erythrothorax Michener, 1936
- Anthophora estebana Cockerell, 1923
- Anthophora eugeniae Gussakovsky, 1935
- Anthophora eustatiensis Brooks, 1999
- Anthophora eversa Cockerell, 1911
- Anthophora eversmannii (Dalla Torre & Friese, 1895)
- Anthophora excelsior Strand, 1916
- Anthophora excisa Morawitz, 1894
- Anthophora exigua Cresson, 1879
- Anthophora extricata Priesner, 1957
- Anthophora facialoides Brooks, 1988
- Anthophora fallaciosa Priesner, 1957
- Anthophora fayoumensis Priesner, 1957
- Anthophora fedchenkoi Radoszkowski, 1872
- Anthophora fedorica Cockerell, 1906
- Anthophora femorata (Olivier, 1789)
- Anthophora ferghanensis Gussakovsky, 1935
- Anthophora ferreola Cockerell, 1931
- Anthophora ferripicta Cockerell, 1935
- Anthophora ferruginea Lepeletier, 1841
- Anthophora festae Gribodo, 1924
- Anthophora finitima Morawitz, 1894
- Anthophora fixseni Morawitz, 1876
- Anthophora flabellata Priesner, 1957
- Anthophora flavescens Fedtschenko, 1875
- Anthophora flavicornis Morawitz, 1886
- Anthophora flaviscopa Eardley & Brooks, 1989
- Anthophora flavocincta Huard, 1897
- Anthophora flavofimbriata Hedicke, 1931
- Anthophora flavonigra (Wu, 1988)
- Anthophora flexipes Cresson, 1879
- Anthophora footei Crawford, 1914
- Anthophora forbesi Cockerell, 1907
- Anthophora franciscana Cockerell, 1949
- Anthophora fratercula Gribodo, 1924
- Anthophora fraterna Bingham, 1897
- Anthophora freimuthi Fedtschenko, 1875
- Anthophora fuliginosa Morawitz, 1894
- Anthophora fulvicauda Timberlake, 1937
- Anthophora fulvipes Eversmann, 1846
- Anthophora fulvitarsis Brullé, 1832
- Anthophora fulvodimidiata Dours, 1869
- Anthophora furcata (Panzer, 1798)
- Anthophora furcotibialis Wu, 1985
- Anthophora galalensis Priesner, 1957
- Anthophora gemella Morawitz, 1878
- Anthophora ghigii Gribodo, 1924
- Anthophora glasunovi Morawitz, 1894
- Anthophora glaucopis Friese, 1905
- Anthophora gracilipes Morawitz, 1873
- Anthophora hanseni Morawitz, 1883
- Anthophora harmalae Morawitz, 1878
- Anthophora hebeiensis Wu, 2000
- Anthophora hedickei Alfken, 1938
- Anthophora hedini Alfken, 1936
- Anthophora hegasica Priesner, 1957
- Anthophora heinemanni Fedtschenko, 1875
- Anthophora heliopolitensis Pérez, 1910
- Anthophora hermanni Schwarz & Gusenleitner, 2003
- Anthophora hilaris Smith, 1879
- Anthophora hirtiventris Friese, 1911
- Anthophora hispanica (Fabricius, 1787)
- Anthophora hispaniola Brooks, 1999
- Anthophora hololeuca Cockerell, 1923
- Anthophora holoxantha Pérez, 1895
- Anthophora hortensis Morawitz, 1886
- Anthophora huashanensis Wu, 2000
- Anthophora humilis (Spinola, 1838)
- Anthophora incerta Spinola, 1851
- Anthophora inclyta Walker, 1871
- Anthophora intricata Gribodo, 1924
- Anthophora iole Bingham, 1898
- Anthophora ireos (Pallas, 1773)
- Anthophora irregularis Dours, 1869
- Anthophora joetta Brooks, 1988
- Anthophora kaufmanni Fedtschenko, 1875
- Anthophora kazabi Banaszak, 1984
- Anthophora kigomensis Cockerell, 1938
- Anthophora kigonserana Friese, 1905
- Anthophora kneuckeri Alfken, 1938
- Anthophora kochi Fedtschenko, 1875
- Anthophora kodrokonis Cockerell, 1946
- Anthophora kristenseni Friese, 1915
- Anthophora kroneberfi Fedtschenko, 1875
- Anthophora krugeri Eardley & Brooks, 1989
- Anthophora labrosa Friese, 1911
- Anthophora lacteifrons Hedicke, 1931
- Anthophora laevigata Spinola, 1808
- Anthophora lanata (Klug, 1845)
- Anthophora lanzarotensis (Tkalcu, 1993)
- Anthophora larvata Giraud, 1863
- Anthophora leonis Cockerell, 1933
- Anthophora lepidodea Dours, 1869
- Anthophora lesquerellae (Cockerell, 1896)
- Anthophora leucophaea Pérez, 1879
- Anthophora leucopyga Friese, 1911
- Anthophora leucorhina Cockerell, 1917
- Anthophora libyphaenica Gribodo, 1893
- Anthophora lieftincki (Tkalcu, 1993)
- Anthophora linsleyi Timberlake, 1941
- Anthophora loczyi Mocsáry, 1892
- Anthophora loewi Fedtschenko, 1875
- Anthophora longipes Morawitz, 1884
- Anthophora lumbwana Cockerell, 1946
- Anthophora lusitanica Friese, 1919
- Anthophora lydia Tkalcu, 1994
- Anthophora maculifrons Cresson, 1879
- Anthophora maculigera Priesner, 1957
- Anthophora maculilabralis Wu, 2000
- Anthophora mangkamensis Wu, 1982
- Anthophora marginata Smith, 1854
- Anthophora martensi Fedtschenko, 1875
- Anthophora matopensis Cockerell, 1933
- Anthophora mediozonata Laboulbene, 1870
- Anthophora megarrhina Cockerell, 1910
- Anthophora melanocephala Morawitz, 1894
- Anthophora melanognatha Cockerell, 1911
- Anthophora melanopyga Fedtschenko, 1875
- Anthophora mellina Priesner, 1957
- Anthophora mephistophelicana Strand, 1911
- Anthophora meridionalis Fedtschenko, 1875
- Anthophora metallica Morawitz, 1886
- Anthophora micheneri Brooks, 1988
- Anthophora microrhina Wu, 2000
- Anthophora mongolica Morawitz, 1890
- Anthophora montana Cresson, 1869
- Anthophora morawitzi Friese, 1909
- Anthophora moricei (Friese, 1899)
- Anthophora mortuaria Timberlake, 1937
- Anthophora mucoriventris Friese, 1922
- Anthophora murina Fedtschenko, 1875
- Anthophora murutica Friese, 1919
- Anthophora muscaria Fedtschenko, 1875
- Anthophora namaquensis Eardley & Brooks, 1989
- Anthophora neavei Vachal, 1910
- Anthophora neglecta Timberlake & Cockerell, 1936
- Anthophora nigriceps Morawitz, 1886
- Anthophora nigrifacies Friese, 1905
- Anthophora nigrifrons Cockerell, 1931
- Anthophora nigrilabris Spinola, 1838
- Anthophora nigripes Pérez, 1879
- Anthophora nigritula Cockerell, 1924
- Anthophora nigrocaudata Wu, 2000
- Anthophora nigrociliata Pérez, 1895
- Anthophora niveifascies Hedicke, 1940
- Anthophora niveiventris Friese, 1919
- Anthophora nurrana Cockerell, 1931
- Anthophora obtusispina Wu, 1982
- Anthophora occidentalis Cresson, 1869
- Anthophora occulta Hedicke, 1938
- Anthophora oldi Meade-Waldo, 1914
- Anthophora olgae Fedtschenko, 1875
- Anthophora onosmarum Morawitz, 1876
- Anthophora orientalis Morawitz, 1877
- Anthophora orophila Cockerell, 1910
- Anthophora orotavae (Saunders, 1904)
- Anthophora pachyodonta Cockerell, 1923
- Anthophora pacifica Cresson, 1878
- Anthophora padiola Vachal, 1909
- Anthophora paranensis Holmberg, 1903
- Anthophora patruelis Cockerell, 1931
- Anthophora pedata Eversmann, 1852
- Anthophora perdita Cockerell, 1946
- Anthophora perezi Morawitz, 1895
- Anthophora peritomae Cockerell, 1905
- Anthophora perlustrata Priesner, 1957
- Anthophora petersenii Morawitz, 1884
- Anthophora petrophila Cockerell, 1905
- Anthophora phaceliae Brooks, 1988
- Anthophora phenax (Cockerell, 1898)
- Anthophora pilifrons Packard, 1869
- Anthophora plagiata (Illiger, 1806)
- Anthophora plagioleuca Hedicke, 1940
- Anthophora planca Pérez, 1895
- Anthophora platti Timberlake, 1951
- Anthophora plumipes (Pallas, 1772)
- Anthophora podagra Lepeletier, 1841
- Anthophora ponomarevae Brooks, 1988
- Anthophora porphyrea Westrich, 1993
- Anthophora porterae Cockerell, 1900
- Anthophora postica Vachal, 1910
- Anthophora praecox Friese, 1909
- Anthophora pretiosa Friese, 1919
- Anthophora priesneri Alfken, 1932
- Anthophora proxima Morawitz, 1894
- Anthophora prshewalskii Morawitz, 1880
- Anthophora pruinosa Smith, 1854
- Anthophora pubescens (Fabricius, 1781)
- Anthophora pueblo (Pueblo digger bee)
- Anthophora pulverosa Smith, 1854
- Anthophora punctilabris Pérez, 1879
- Anthophora purpuraria Westrich, 1993
- Anthophora pygmaea Dours, 1869
- Anthophora qinghaiensis Wu, 2000
- Anthophora quadricolor (Erichson, 1840)
- Anthophora quadrimaculata (Panzer, 1798)
- Anthophora raddei Morawitz, 1876
- Anthophora radoszkowskyi Fedtschenko, 1875
- Anthophora repleta Dours, 1869
- Anthophora retusa (Linnaeus, 1758)
- Anthophora rhodesiae Meade-Waldo, 1914
- Anthophora rhodothorax Michener, 1936
- Anthophora richaensis Alfken, 1938
- Anthophora rivolleti Pérez, 1895
- Anthophora robbi Cockerell, 1911
- Anthophora robusta (Klug, 1845)
- Anthophora rogenhoferi Morawitz, 1872
- Anthophora romandii Dours, 1869
- Anthophora rubricrus Dours, 1869
- Anthophora rudolphae Romankova, 2003
- Anthophora ruficaudis (Cameron, 1905)
- Anthophora rufolanata Dours, 1869
- Anthophora rufovestita Cockerell, 1946
- Anthophora rugosa Radoszkowski, 1884
- Anthophora rutilans Dours, 1869
- Anthophora sagemehli Morawitz, 1883
- Anthophora salazariae Timberlake, 1937
- Anthophora saropodoides (Dalla Torre, 1896)
- Anthophora schultzei Friese, 1909
- Anthophora scopipes Spinola, 1838
- Anthophora sefrensis Cockerell, 1933
- Anthophora selecta Priesner, 1957
- Anthophora semicinerea Dours, 1869
- Anthophora semirufa (Friese, 1898)
- Anthophora senescens Lepeletier, 1841
- Anthophora senicula Pérez, 1902
- Anthophora senilis Eversmann, 1846
- Anthophora sergia (Nurse, 1904)
- Anthophora shagrensis Priesner, 1957
- Anthophora shestakovi Gussakovsky, 1935
- Anthophora sichelii Radoszkowski, 1869
- Anthophora sichuanensis (Wu, 1986)
- Anthophora siewersi Morawitz, 1876
- Anthophora signata Brooks, 1988
- Anthophora similis Fedtschenko, 1875
- Anthophora simplicipes Morawitz, 1880
- Anthophora sinensis (Wu, 1982)
- Anthophora soikai Benoist, 1961
- Anthophora solskyi Fedtschenko, 1875
- Anthophora spinacoxa Brooks, 1988
- Anthophora spinipes (Friese, 1899)
- Anthophora spinitarsis Wu, 1982
- Anthophora squammulosa Dours, 1869
- Anthophora stilobia Wu, 2000
- Anthophora strauchi Fedtschenko, 1875
- Anthophora strucki Eardley & Brooks, 1989
- Anthophora subaequa (Kohl, 1905)
- Anthophora submicans Gussakovsky, 1935
- Anthophora subserricornis Morawitz, 1894
- Anthophora superans Walker, 1871
- Anthophora suworzevi Morawitz, 1888
- Anthophora syriaca Friese, 1922
- Anthophora tarsalis Priesner, 1957
- Anthophora tarsidens Fedtschenko, 1875
- Anthophora tedshenensis Radoszkowski, 1893
- Anthophora tenella (Klug, 1845)
- Anthophora terminalis Cresson, 1869
- Anthophora testaceipes Morawitz, 1888
- Anthophora tetradonta Cockerell, 1933
- Anthophora thomsoni Saunders, 1882
- Anthophora tibialis Morawitz, 1894
- Anthophora torridella Meade-Waldo, 1914
- Anthophora trichopus Hedicke, 1940
- Anthophora tricolor (Fabricius, 1775)
- Anthophora tridentata (Friese, 1899)
- Anthophora tridentella Priesner, 1957
- Anthophora trifasciata Radoszkowski, 1886
- Anthophora trilineata (Pérez, 1906)
- Anthophora trochanterica Morawitz, 1888
- Anthophora tuberculilabris Dours, 1869
- Anthophora turcomanica Morawitz, 1888
- Anthophora uljanini Fedtschenko, 1875
- Anthophora uniciliata Sichel, 1860
- Anthophora urbana Cresson, 1878
- Anthophora ursina Cresson, 1869
- Anthophora usbekistana Cockerell, 1930
- Anthophora usticauda Cockerell, 1912
- Anthophora valga (Klug, 1845)
- Anthophora vallorum (Cockerell, 1896)
- Anthophora vannigera Timberlake, 1951
- Anthophora ventrilabris Lepeletier, 1841
- Anthophora vernalis Morawitz, 1878
- Anthophora versicolor Friese, 1925
- Anthophora vestita Smith, 1854
- Anthophora vidua (Klug, 1845)
- Anthophora villosula Smith, 1854
- Anthophora volucellaeformis Dours, 1869
- Anthophora wadicola Alfken, 1935
- Anthophora walshii Cresson, 1869
- Anthophora walteri Gonzalez, 2004
- Anthophora waltoni Cockerell, 1910
- Anthophora wartmanni Friese, 1905
- Anthophora wegelini Friese, 1914
- Anthophora wuae Brooks, 1988
- Anthophora xanthochlora Cockerell, 1923
- Anthophora xanthostoma Cockerell, 1932
- Anthophora xinjiangensis (Wu, 1985)
- Anthophora xizangensis (Wu, 1988)
- Anthophora zamoranella Cockerell, 1949
- Anthophora zanoni Gribodo, 1924
- Anthophora zimini Gussakovsky, 1935
- Anthophora zombana Cockerell, 1910
