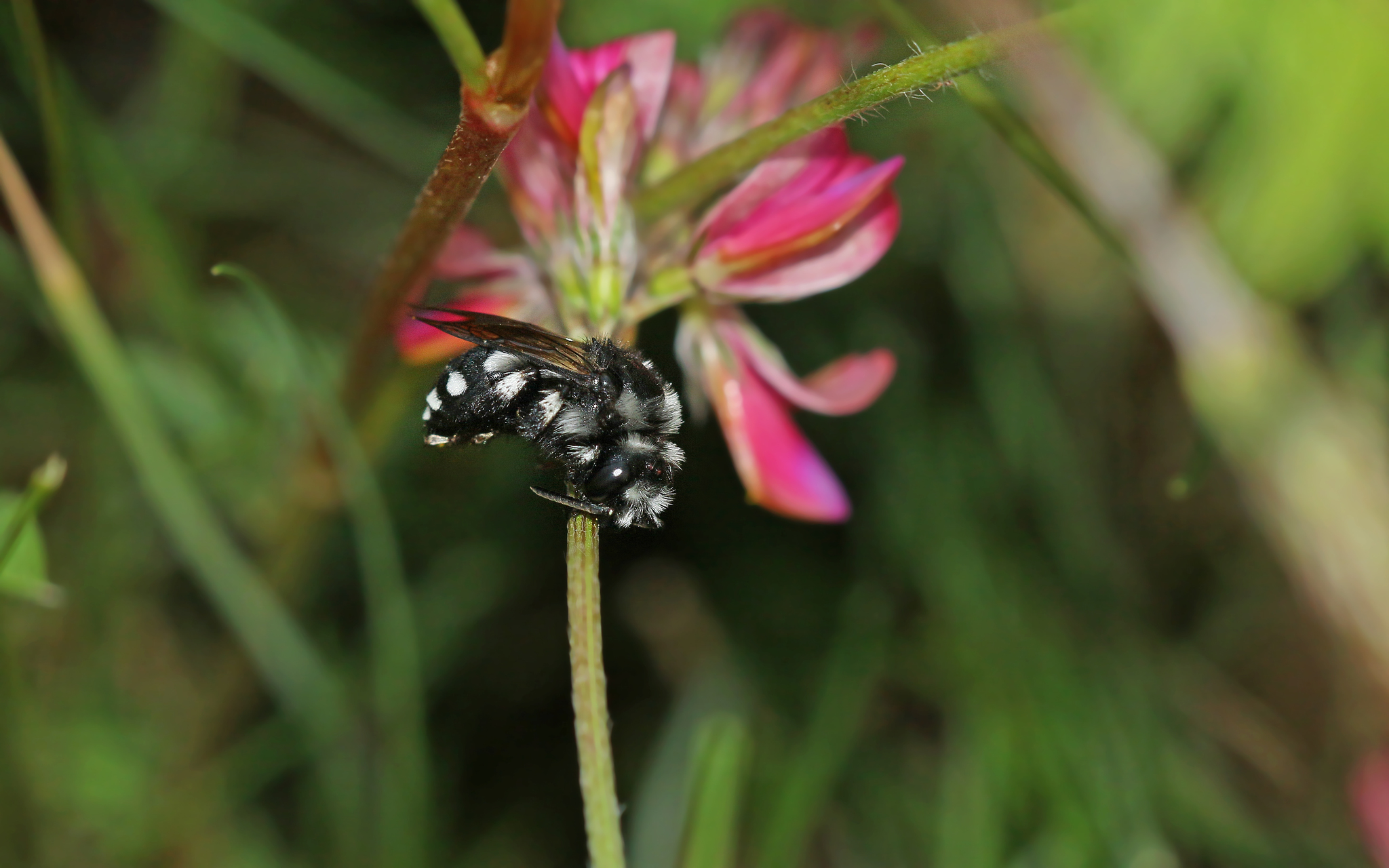
- Square-spotted mourning bee (Melecta luctuosa), Oberelsbach, Germany, June 2020

Scientific classification
- Domain: Eukaryota
- Kingdom: Animalia
- Phylum: Arthropoda
- Class: Insecta
- Order: Hymenoptera
- Family: Apidae
- Genus: Melecta
- Species: M. luctuosa

Binomial name
- Melecta luctuosa (Scopoli, 1770)

= Melecta luctuosa =

Species of bee

Melecta luctuosa, also known as square-spotted mourning bee, is a species of bee within the family Apidae.

== Description ==
Melecta luctuosa measure 12–14 mm. The males and females have black hair with white patches of hair. The mesonotum and sides of the thorax are hairy gray.

== Range ==
Melecta luctuosa occurs in North Africa from the Canaries to Egypt. In Eurasia from Portugal across Europe, Asia Minor, Caucasus, Central Asia and Siberia to the Amur; north to southern England and southern Sweden (lost in both countries), the Baltic States and Moscow; south to Sicily, Crete, Cyprus and Northern Iran. It reached the oriental fauna region in Pakistan. The species is currently reported in central Europe from almost all regions, only from Lower Saxony, Saxony-Anhalt, Canton Vaud and Basel only historically; absent in large parts of the eastern central plateau, along the main Alpine ridge and in the Engadine; a report for the federal state of Salzburg needs to be checked.

== Habitat ==
Forest fringes, hedges, steep walls, edges, dry stone walls, sand, gravel and clay pits. From the lowlands to the montane elevation.

== Ecology ==
This species is univoltin. It is on the wing from late April to late June and is wintering as an imago. Various plant species serve as (exchangeable) nectar sources, e.g. Ajuga reptans, Glechoma hederacea, Salvia pratensis, Salvia verticillata, Nepeta, Echium vulgare, Anchusa officinalis. Melecta luctuosa is a parasitoid species. The main host is Anthophora aestivalis, other known hosts are Anthophora crinipes, Anthophora plagiata and Anthophora retusa, possibly also Anthophora fulvitarsis.

== Etymology ==
From Latin, luctuosa = "sad".

== Taxonomy ==
It belongs to the subgenus Melecta Latreille, 1802.
