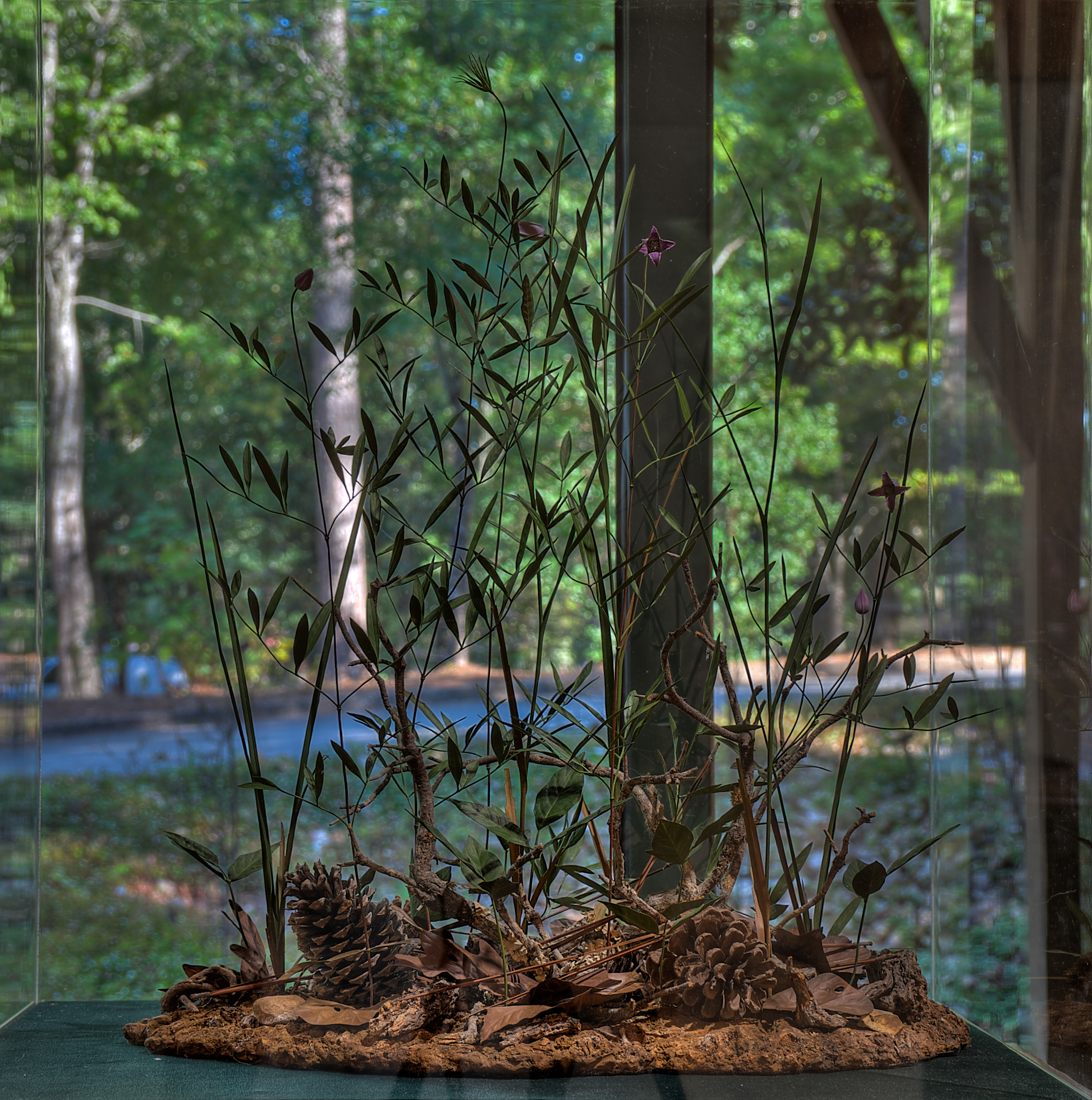
- Clematis socialis exhibit at Callaway Gardens

Conservation status
- Critically Imperiled (NatureServe)

- Endangered (ESA)

Scientific classification
- Kingdom: Plantae
- Clade: Tracheophytes
- Clade: Angiosperms
- Clade: Eudicots
- Order: Ranunculales
- Family: Ranunculaceae
- Genus: Clematis
- Species: C. socialis

Binomial name
- Clematis socialis Kral

= Clematis socialis =

Species of flowering plant in the buttercup family

Clematis socialis is a rare species of flowering plant in the buttercup family known by the common name Alabama leather flower. It is native to the US states of Alabama and Georgia, where it is known from only five populations. The species is seriously threatened by habitat destruction. It is a federally listed endangered species.

This plant was discovered in 1980 next to a highway in St. Clair County, Alabama, and described to science as a new species in 1982. A second, very small population was found a few years later in Cherokee County. When searches revealed no more occurrences, the plant was placed on the endangered species list in 1986. As of 2010 there are four populations in Alabama and one in Georgia; four of the five populations appear stable but two of these occupy less than 1-acre (4,000 m^{2}) of territory each and only two are protected.

This is a rhizomatous perennial herb growing up to half a meter in erect height. It is not viny like many other Clematis. The plant generally forms colonies of stems that sprout up from its horizontal rhizome, so what appears to be a number of plants are actually one plant with several clones attached to its root. The lower leaves are simple or lobed, and the upper leaves may be compound, divided into thin, lance-shaped leaflets. Leaves at the very base of the plant may be scale-like. The inflorescence is a solitary flower at the tip of the stem. Its four purple-blue sepals are arranged in an urn shape with spreading, pointed tips; there are no petals. The flower may reach 3 centimeters in length. The fruit is up to 2.5 centimeters long including its hairy, elongated beak.

Sexual reproduction is rare in this species, which undergoes vegetative reproduction by sprouting repeatedly from its rhizome. The formation of seed is inhibited when the plant is shaded in the understory. It is dependent on pollinators for fertilization. The most effective pollinator is the bee Anthophora ursina, and the bumblebee Bombus pensylvanicus is generally the first pollinator to visit the flowers in an early-bloom season. Other insects that visit the plant include the butterflies Juvenal's duskywing (Erynnis juvenalis) and snowberry clearwing (Hemaris diffinis) and the eastern carpenter bee (Xylocopa virginica). Research suggests the plant is not pollinated by insects often enough to have an optimum fruit yield. Surprisingly, a genetic analysis of the species revealed a moderate level of genetic diversity, a level higher than would be expected for a rare narrow endemic plant that favors vegetative reproduction as much as this one.

The natural habitat is probably a mix of prairie and swampy forest ecosystems, but what types are uncertain because the plant is only known from human-altered habitat today. Its ability to exist amid such disturbance suggests it may be adapted to a naturally disturbed type of habitat, such as one that burns often. The plant is more abundant and undergoes sexual reproduction more often in open areas where it receives at least partial sun. It is often found with Phlox glaberrima, a common flower of the prairie which is now considered an indicator of potential appropriate habitat for the Clematis.

The main threat to this species is the destruction, degradation, and modification of its habitat. Some populations known to have existed have since been destroyed by such activities as installation of gas pipelines and road resurfacing. The first population ever discovered was on a highly disturbed patch of land that had been dug up to remove diseased trees. It was situated next to a highway where it had experienced road maintenance and landscaping activity such as herbicides, mowing, and erosion. This patch of land was private property that was slated for residential development. When it was added to the endangered species list, the species was called "imminently threatened" and "extremely vulnerable".

All the current populations are experiencing competition from other plants. When the plant does succeed in reproducing sexually, mice (Peromyscus spp.) often eat the seeds. Climate change is suggested as a potential threat to the species by several means, such as decreasing pollinator numbers. As of 2010 the plant is still designated endangered.
