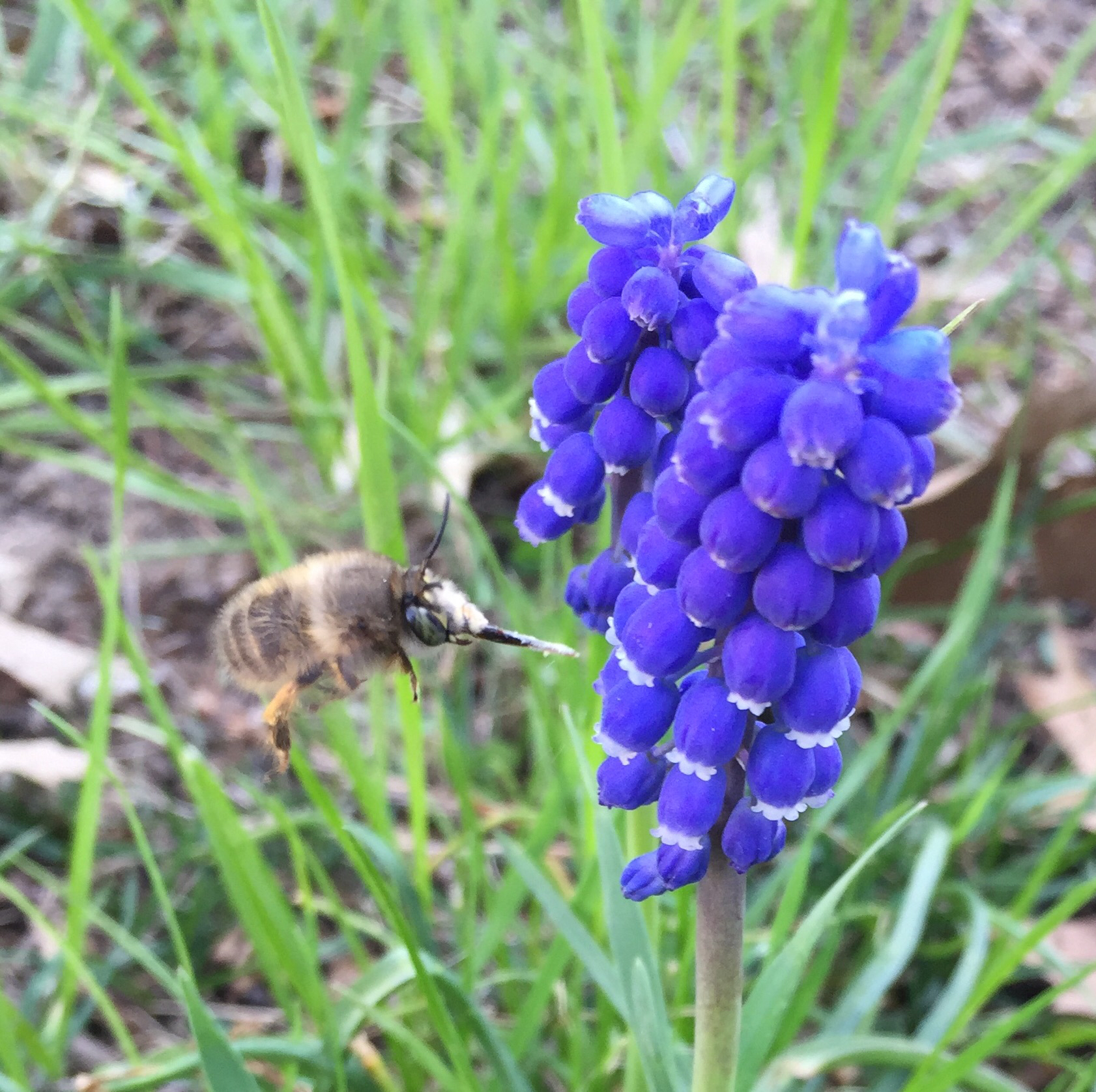
- Visiting grape hyacinth, Washington, D.C.

Scientific classification
- Domain: Eukaryota
- Kingdom: Animalia
- Phylum: Arthropoda
- Class: Insecta
- Order: Hymenoptera
- Family: Apidae
- Tribe: Anthophorini
- Genus: Anthophora
- Species: A. villosula

Binomial name
- Anthophora villosula Smith, 1854

= Anthophora villosula =

Species of bee

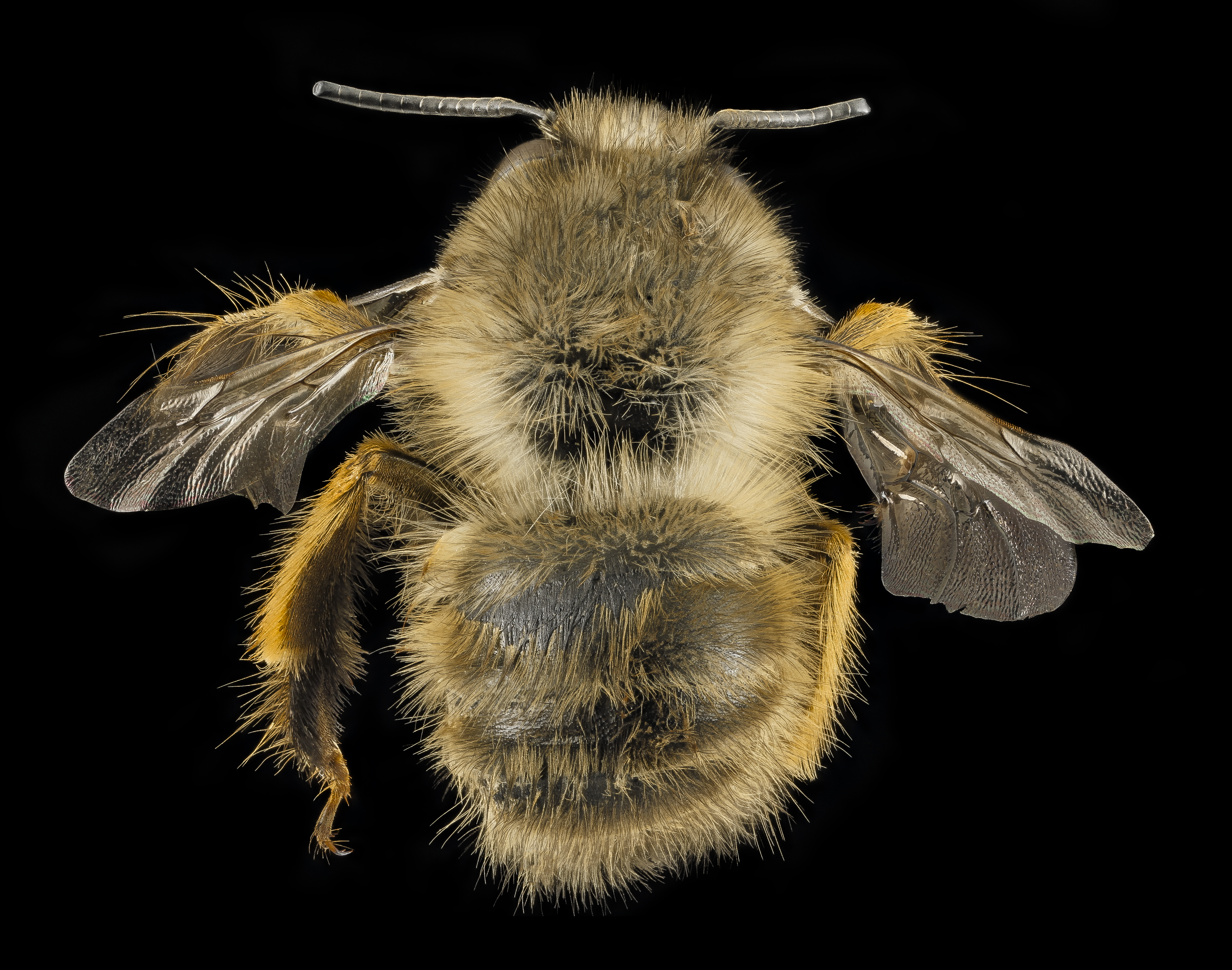
Anthophora villosula

Anthophora villosula, the Asian Shaggy Digger Bee, is a species of anthophorine bee in the family Apidae. It is presumably native to Asia but has been introduced in Maryland, where it has become established.
