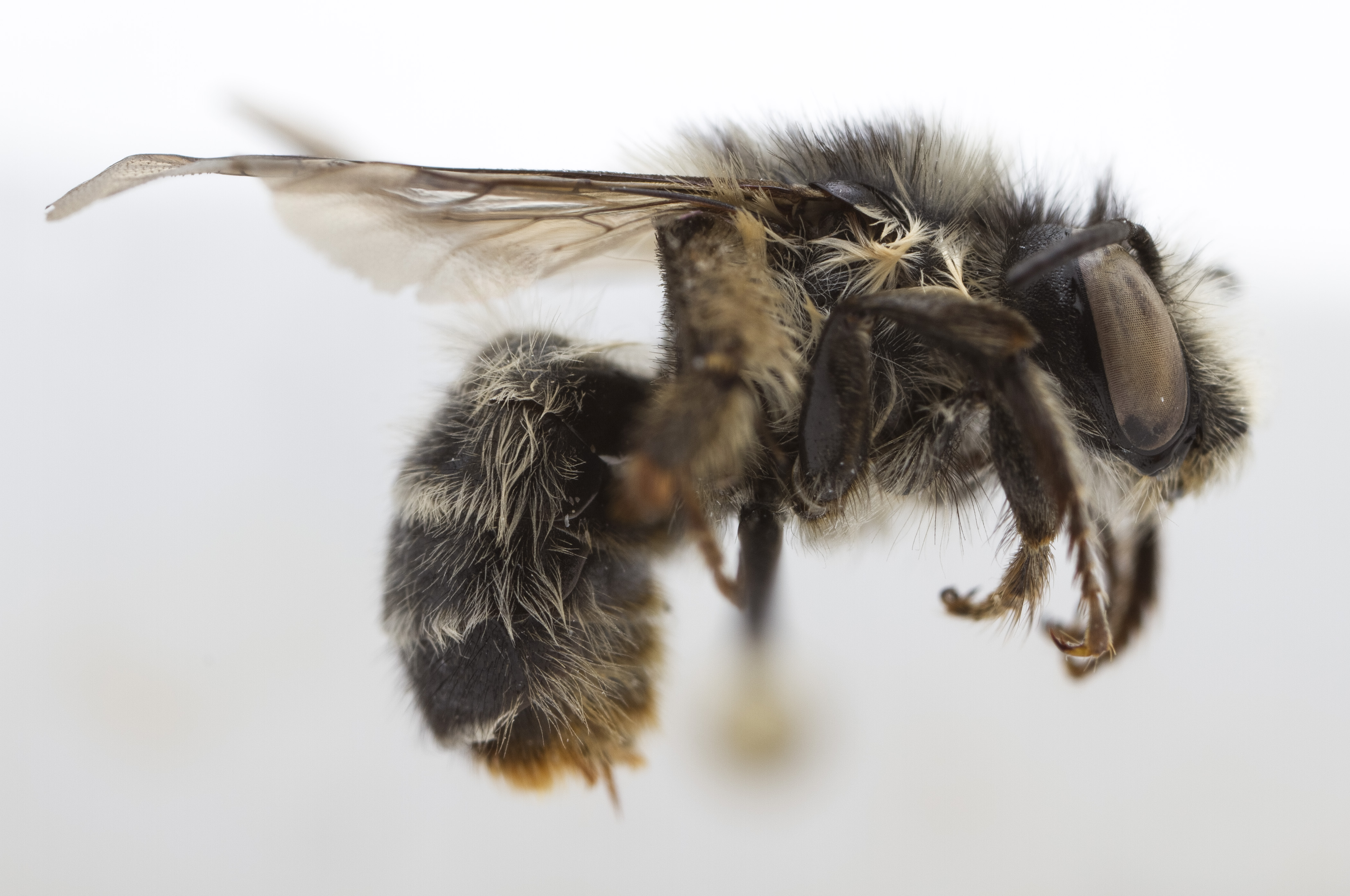

Scientific classification
- Kingdom: Animalia
- Phylum: Arthropoda
- Clade: Pancrustacea
- Class: Insecta
- Order: Hymenoptera
- Family: Apidae
- Tribe: Anthophorini
- Genus: Anthophora
- Species: A. terminalis

Binomial name
- Anthophora terminalis Cresson, 1869

= Anthophora terminalis =

Species of bee

Anthophora terminalis is a species of anthophorine bee in the family Apidae. It is found in North America.
