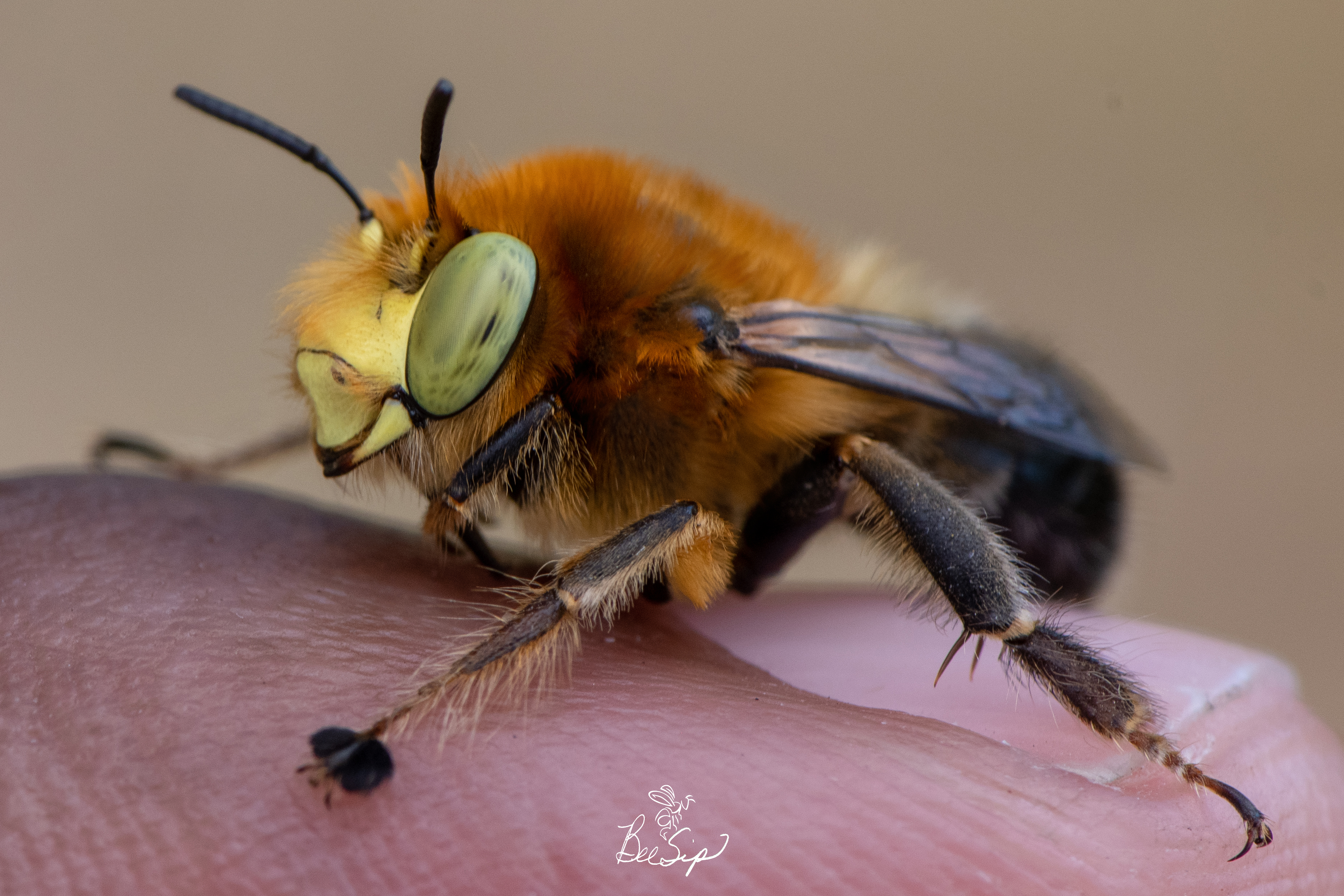

Scientific classification
- Domain: Eukaryota
- Kingdom: Animalia
- Phylum: Arthropoda
- Class: Insecta
- Order: Hymenoptera
- Family: Apidae
- Genus: Anthophora
- Species: A. crotchii

Binomial name
- Anthophora crotchii Cresson, 1878

= Anthophora crotchii =

Species of bee

Anthophora crotchii is a species of anthophorine bee in the family Apidae named after George Robert Crotch. It is found in North America.
