= Anthophora pacifica =

Scientific classification
- Domain: Eukaryota
- Kingdom: Animalia
- Phylum: Arthropoda
- Class: Insecta
- Order: Hymenoptera
- Family: Apidae
- Genus: Anthophora
- Species: A. pacifica

Binomial name
- Anthophora pacifica Cresson, 1878

Species of bee

Anthophora pacifica is a species of anthophorine bee in the family Apidae. It is found in North America.
