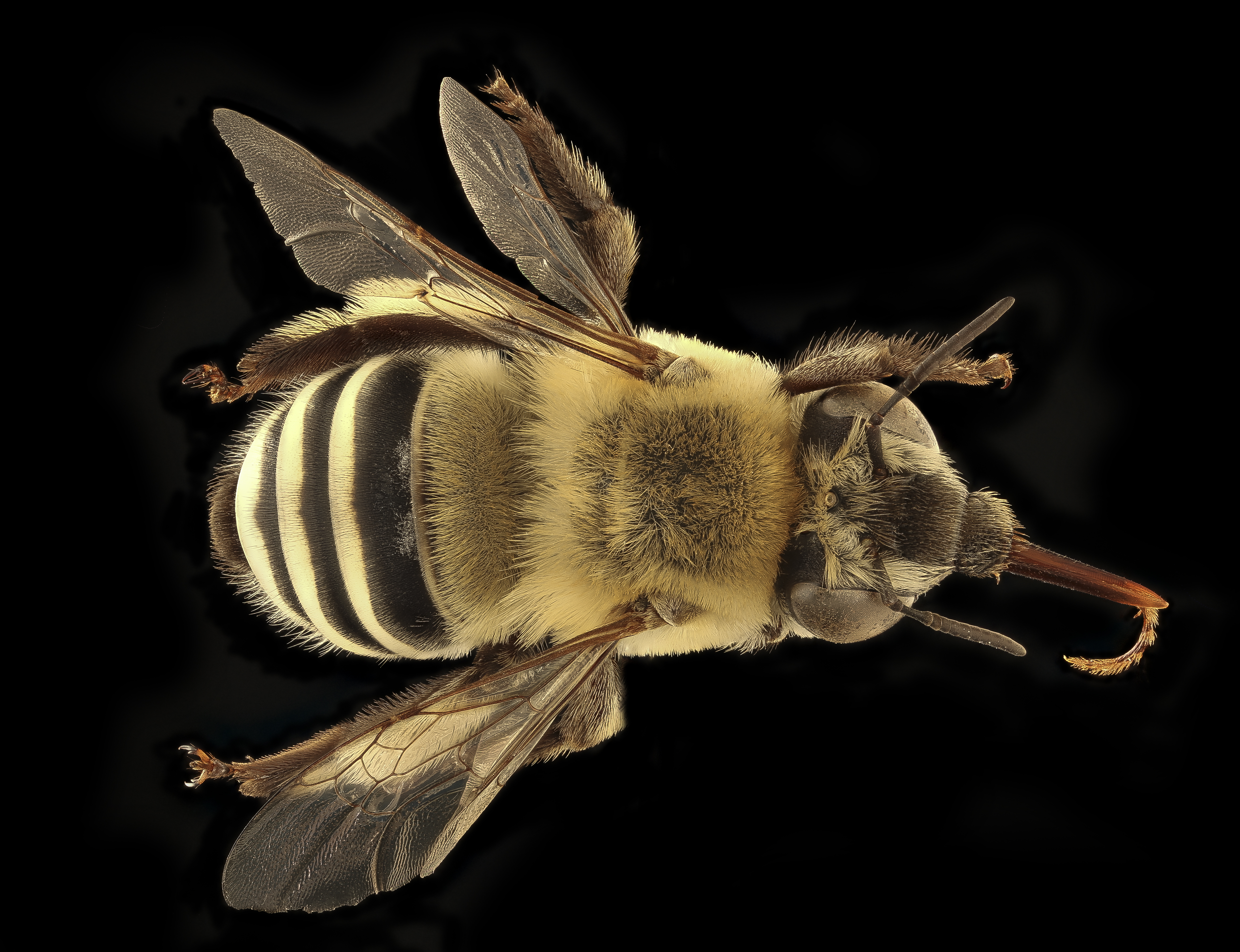

Scientific classification
- Domain: Eukaryota
- Kingdom: Animalia
- Phylum: Arthropoda
- Class: Insecta
- Order: Hymenoptera
- Family: Apidae
- Genus: Anthophora
- Species: A. walshii

Binomial name
- Anthophora walshii Cresson, 1869

= Anthophora walshii =

Species of bee

Anthophora walshii is a species of anthophorine bee in the family Apidae. It is found in North America.

== General Description ==
The Anthophora Walshii shares many features with the commonly found honey bee, having its head, thorax and the first segment of its abdomen covered in long, pale yellow hair. Males and females of this species are seen to be different sizes, with males being generally larger in size than females. On average, males can grow up to a length of 16 mm with an abdomen 6 mm in breadth, and females can grow up to 14 mm in length with an abdomen 5 mm in breadth.
