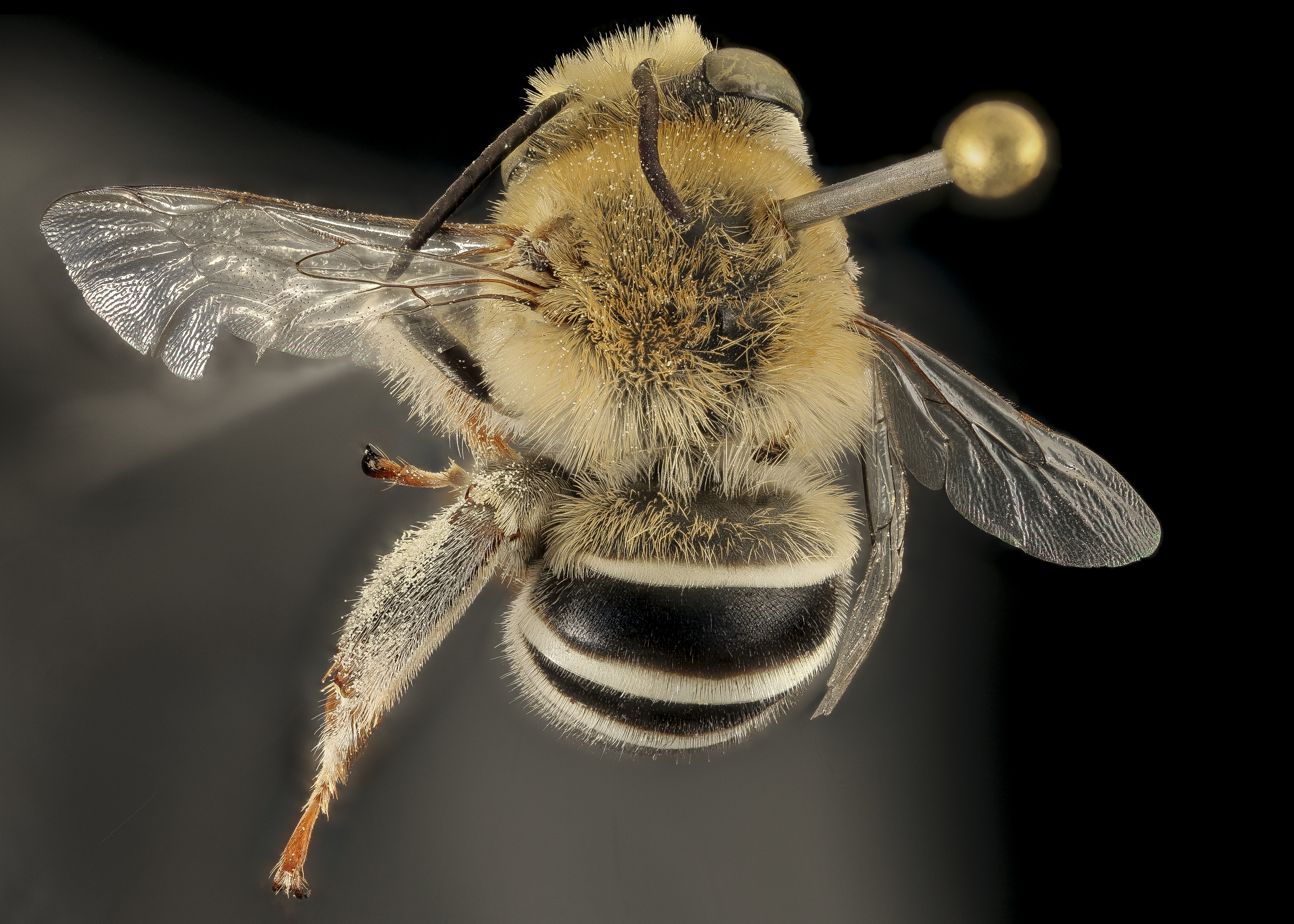

Scientific classification
- Domain: Eukaryota
- Kingdom: Animalia
- Phylum: Arthropoda
- Class: Insecta
- Order: Hymenoptera
- Family: Apidae
- Genus: Anthophora
- Species: A. californica

Binomial name
- Anthophora californica Cresson, 1869

= Anthophora californica =

Species of bee

Anthophora californica is a species of anthophorine bee in the family Apidae. It is found in Central America and North America.

== Subspecies ==
These two subspecies belong to the species Anthophora californica:

- Anthophora californica albomarginata Timberlake, 1937
- Anthophora californica californica Cresson, 1869
