= Anthophora plagiata =

Scientific classification
- Kingdom: Animalia
- Phylum: Arthropoda
- Class: Insecta
- Order: Hymenoptera
- Family: Apidae
- Genus: Anthophora
- Species: A. plagiata

Binomial name
- Anthophora plagiata (Illiger, 1806)

Species of bee

Anthophora plagiata is a species of insect belonging to the family Apidae which is native to Eurasia.

== Distribution ==
Anthophora plagiata can be found in Spain, France, Belgium, Italy, Switzerland, Germany, Denmark, Czechia, Poland and Croatia.
