= Anthophora edwardsii =

Scientific classification
- Domain: Eukaryota
- Kingdom: Animalia
- Phylum: Arthropoda
- Class: Insecta
- Order: Hymenoptera
- Family: Apidae
- Genus: Anthophora
- Species: A. edwardsii

Binomial name
- Anthophora edwardsii Cresson, 1878

Species of bee

Anthophora edwardsii, or Edwards' anthophora, is a species of anthophorine bee in the family Apidae. It is found in western North America. Adults reach 12–18 millimetres (0.47–0.71 in) in length and are black with the thorax covered in gray hairs. Males have a yellow or white facial patch. It often visits manzanita flowers.
