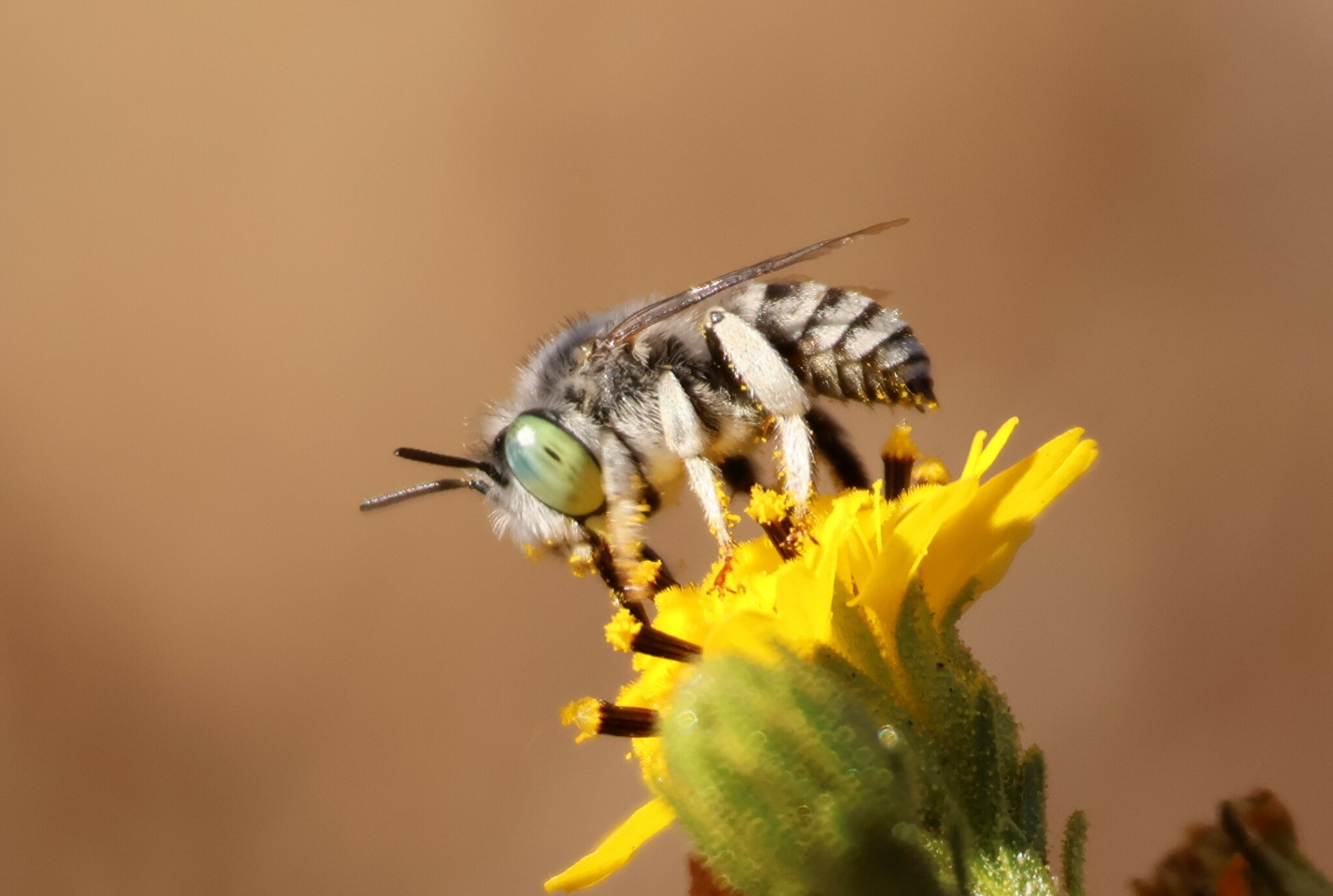

Scientific classification
- Kingdom: Animalia
- Phylum: Arthropoda
- Class: Insecta
- Order: Hymenoptera
- Family: Apidae
- Genus: Anthophora
- Species: A. curta

Binomial name
- Anthophora curta Provancher, 1895

= Anthophora curta =

Species of bee

Anthophora curta, also known as the short sun-digger bee, is a species of digger bee native to North America. A. curta prefers dry, desert-like habitats.
