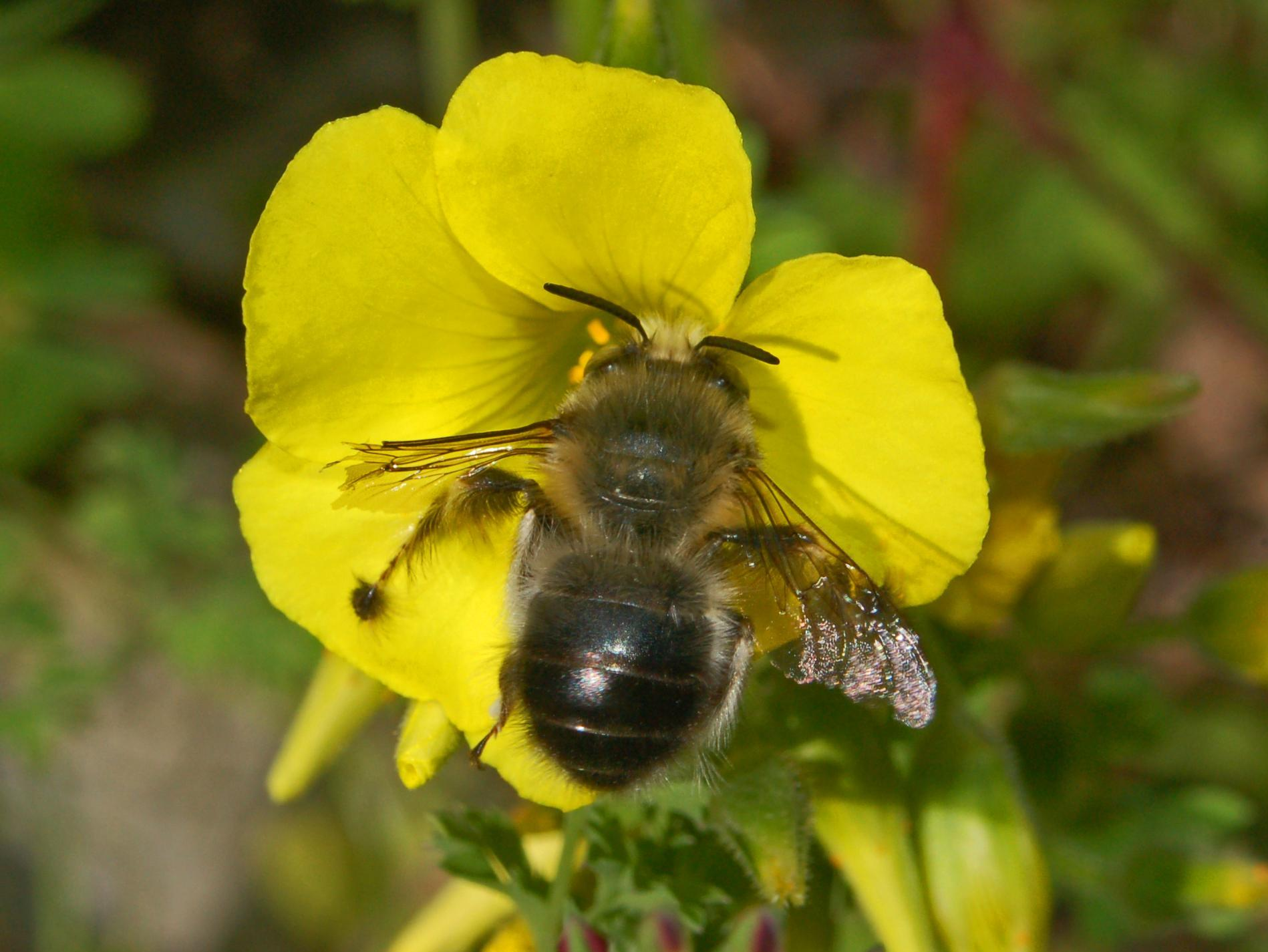
- Anthophora dispar. Male. Wrong image. Represents Anthophora plumipes

Scientific classification
- Kingdom: Animalia
- Phylum: Arthropoda
- Class: Insecta
- Order: Hymenoptera
- Family: Apidae
- Genus: Anthophora
- Species: A. dispar

Binomial name
- Anthophora dispar Lepeletier, 1841

= Anthophora dispar =

Species of bee

Anthophora dispar is a species of bee belonging to the family Apidae subfamily Apinae tribus Anthophorini.

== Description ==
The adults of these long-tongued bees grow up to 14–16 millimetres (0.55–0.63 in) long and can be encountered from early Spring, feeding and collecting pollen and nectar on early flowering plants. The body is densely hairy. The middle legs of males are very elongated with long tufts of black hairs on the tarsi. Males and females have a different pattern and color so that they seem to belong to two distinct species (hence the Latin name "dispar"). In the females the brushes for collecting pollen on their hind legs are red and the abdomen shows white stripes, while it is black in males.

== Distribution ==
They are present in most of France, Italy, Hungary and in North Africa.
