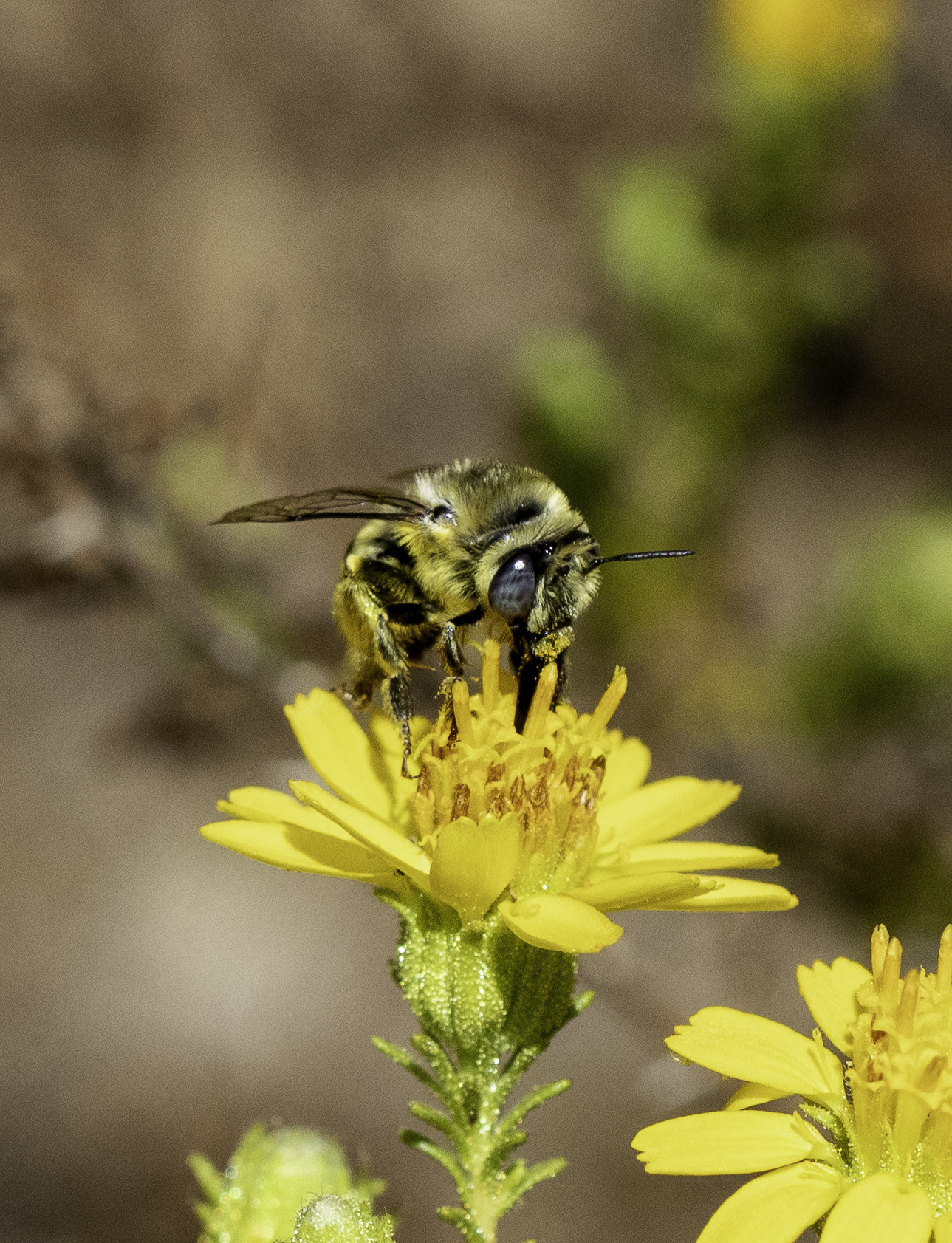
- Ventura County, California, 2022

Scientific classification
- Kingdom: Animalia
- Phylum: Arthropoda
- Clade: Pancrustacea
- Class: Insecta
- Order: Hymenoptera
- Family: Apidae
- Genus: Anthophora
- Species: A. urbana

Binomial name
- Anthophora urbana Cresson, 1878

= Anthophora urbana =

Species of bee

Anthophora urbana, the urbane digger bee, is a species of anthophorine bee in the family Apidae. It is found in Central America and North America. These solitary bees are black with gray hairs, including gray bands around the abdomen. They reach 10–13 millimetres (0.39–0.51 in) in length.

A subspecies of this bee (A. urbana clementina) can be found on San Clemente Island.
