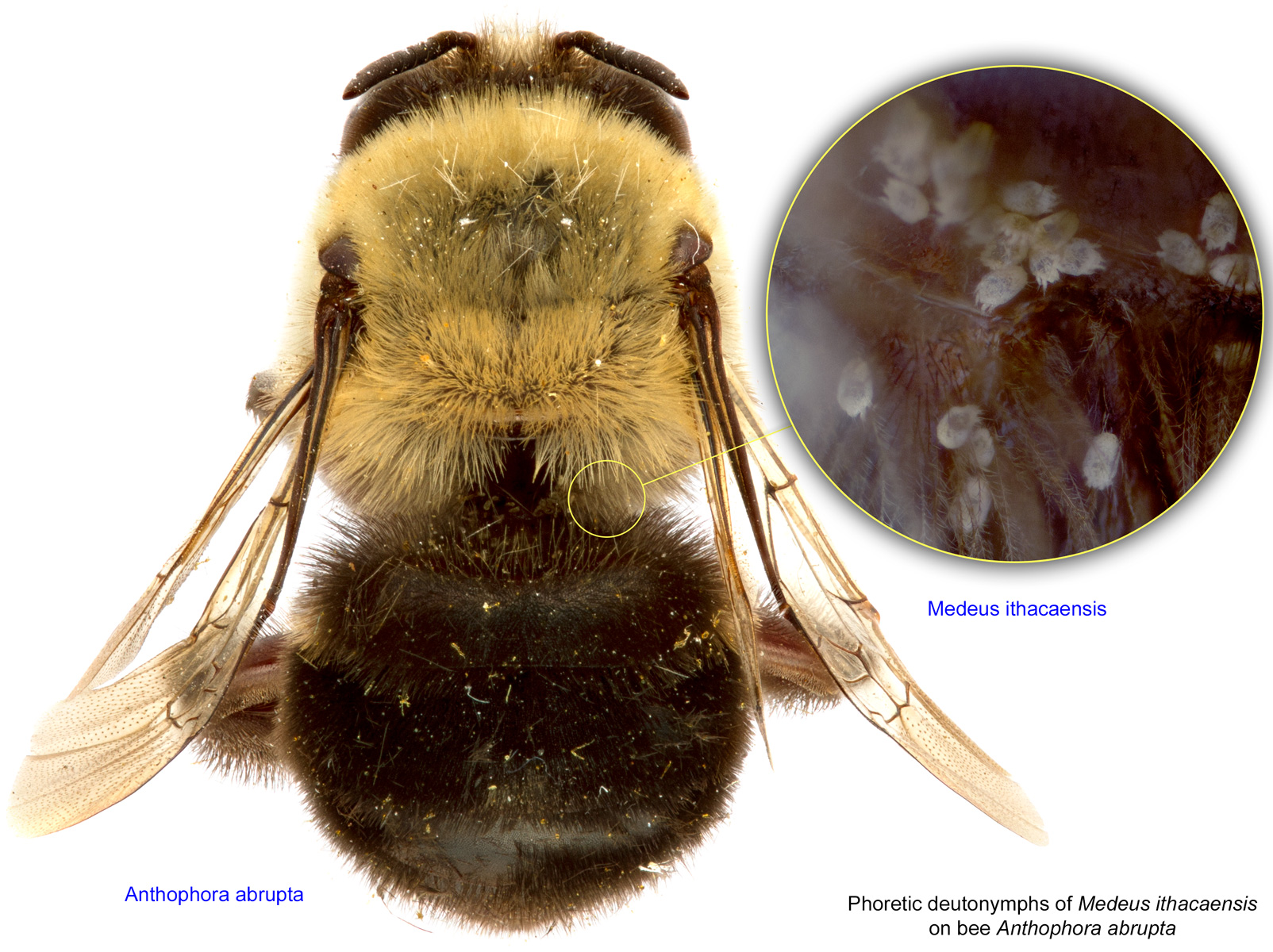

Scientific classification
- Domain: Eukaryota
- Kingdom: Animalia
- Phylum: Arthropoda
- Class: Insecta
- Order: Hymenoptera
- Family: Apidae
- Genus: Anthophora
- Species: A. abrupta

Binomial name
- Anthophora abrupta Say, 1837

= Anthophora abrupta =

Species of bee

Anthophora abrupta is a species of anthophorine bee in the family Apidae. It is found in North America. Females only mate once, while males can mate multiple times. This bee nests gregariously - when one female starts building a nest, others are attracted by her movements and pheromones.

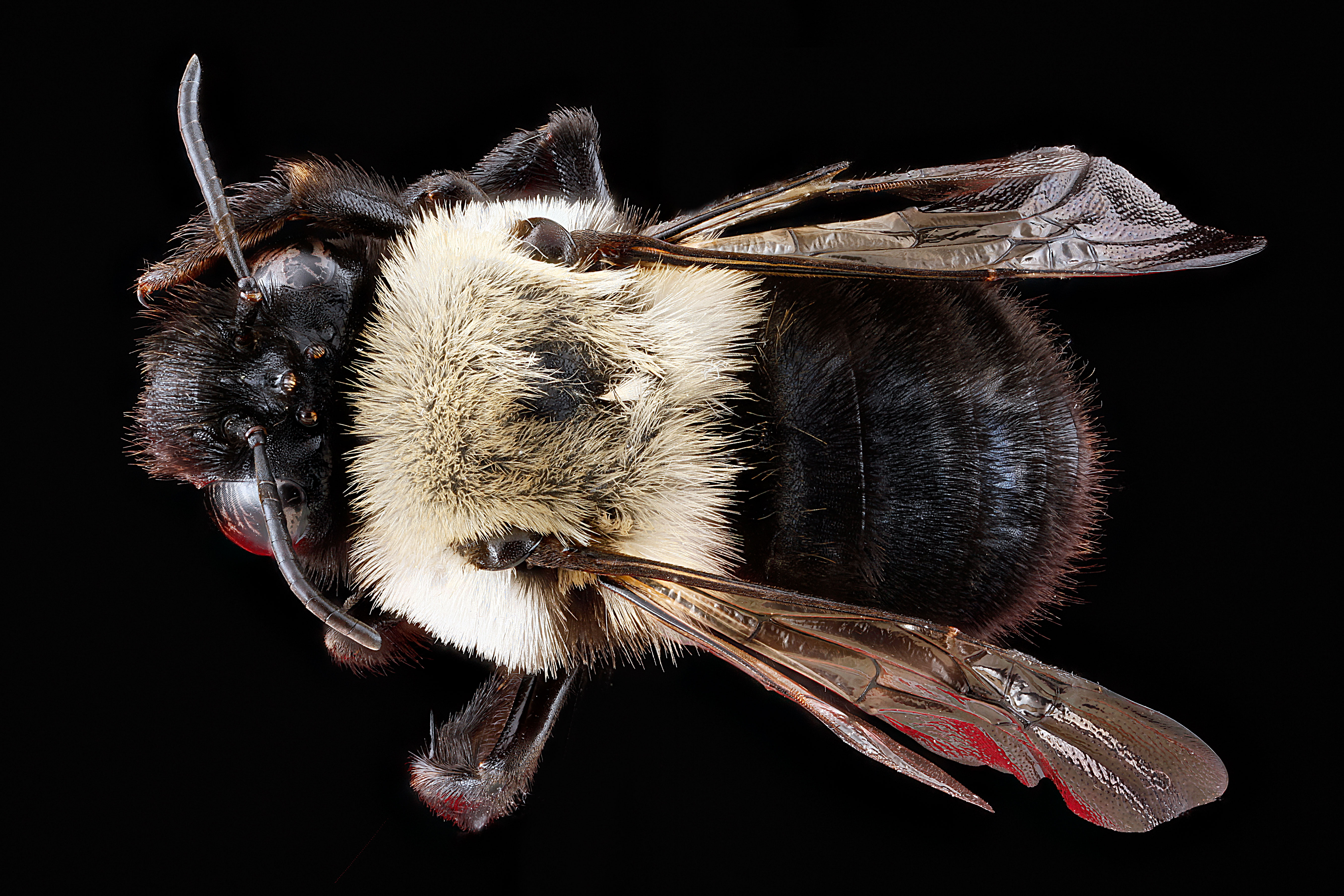
