= Anthophora pueblo =

- A bee in the San Rafael Swell of Utah enters its nest.

Conservation status
- Vulnerable (NatureServe)

Scientific classification
- Kingdom: Animalia
- Phylum: Arthropoda
- Clade: Pancrustacea
- Class: Insecta
- Order: Hymenoptera
- Family: Apidae
- Genus: Anthophora
- Species: A. pueblo

Binomial name
- Anthophora pueblo Orr, 2016

Species of bee found in the United States

Anthophora pueblo, commonly known as the Pueblo sandstone-digger bee, is a species of solitary anthophorine bee belonging to the family Apidae. It is indigenous to the southwestern United States, from California to Colorado.

The species was first identified in 2016 by Michael Orr, Frank Parker, James Pitts, and Terry Griswold. The name of the species recognises the traditional Puebloan cliff-dwellers in the region.

A. pueblo carves nests directly into sandstone walls, sometimes covering walls with thousands of tunnels built over many generations.

A sandstone wall featuring hundreds of Anthophora pueblo tunnels.

Adult bees are approximately 0.39–0.55 in (10–14 mm) in length.
