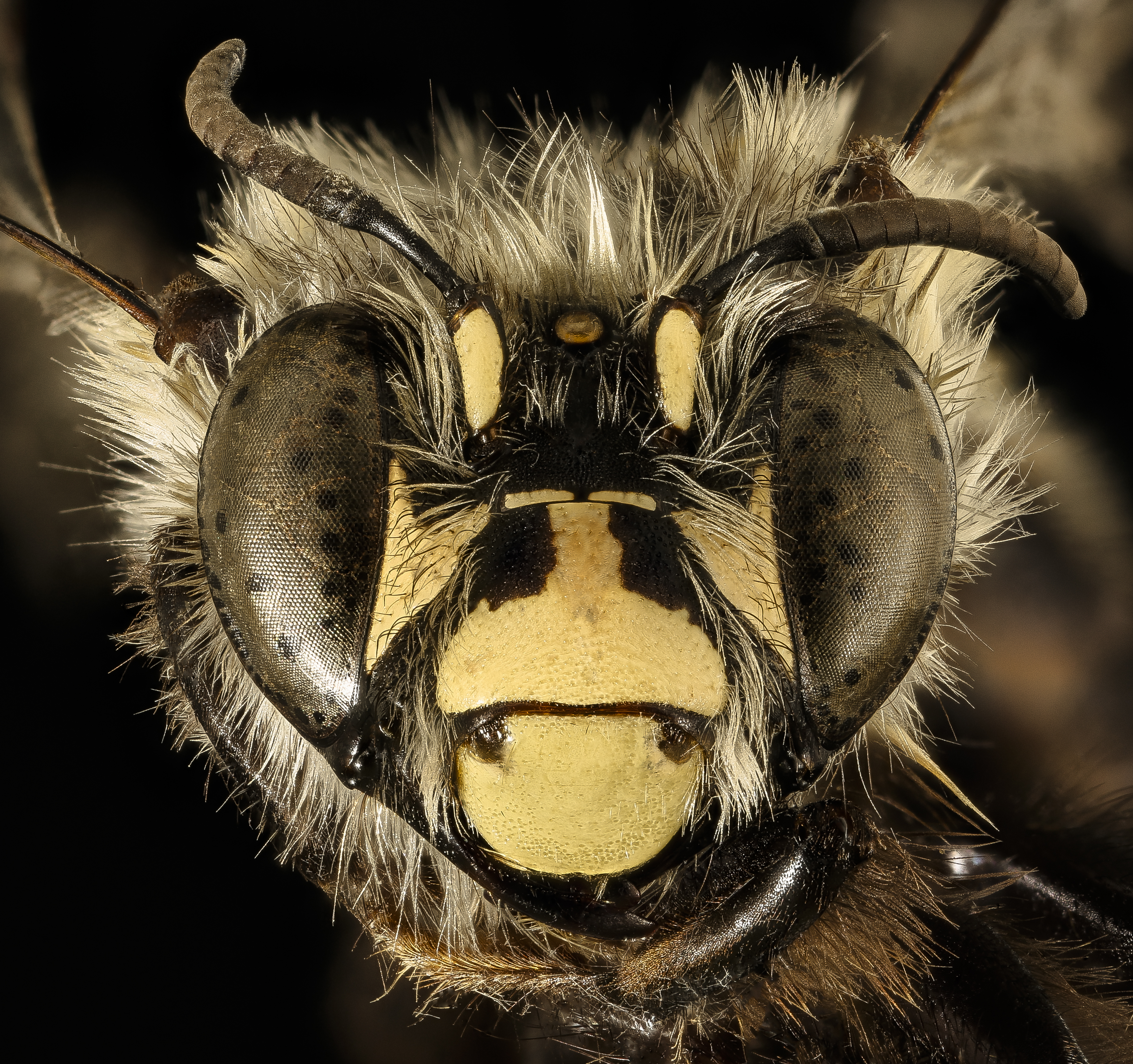

Scientific classification
- Domain: Eukaryota
- Kingdom: Animalia
- Phylum: Arthropoda
- Class: Insecta
- Order: Hymenoptera
- Family: Apidae
- Genus: Anthophora
- Species: A. ursina

Binomial name
- Anthophora ursina Cresson, 1869

= Anthophora ursina =

Species of bee

Anthophora ursina is a species of anthophorine bee in the family Apidae. It is found in North America.
