= Anthophora fedorica =

Conservation status
- Imperiled (NatureServe)

Scientific classification
- Kingdom: Animalia
- Phylum: Arthropoda
- Class: Insecta
- Order: Hymenoptera
- Family: Apidae
- Genus: Anthophora
- Species: A. fedorica

Binomial name
- Anthophora fedorica Cockerell, 1906

Species of bee

Anthophora fedorica is a species of anthophorine bee in the family Apidae. It is found in North America.
