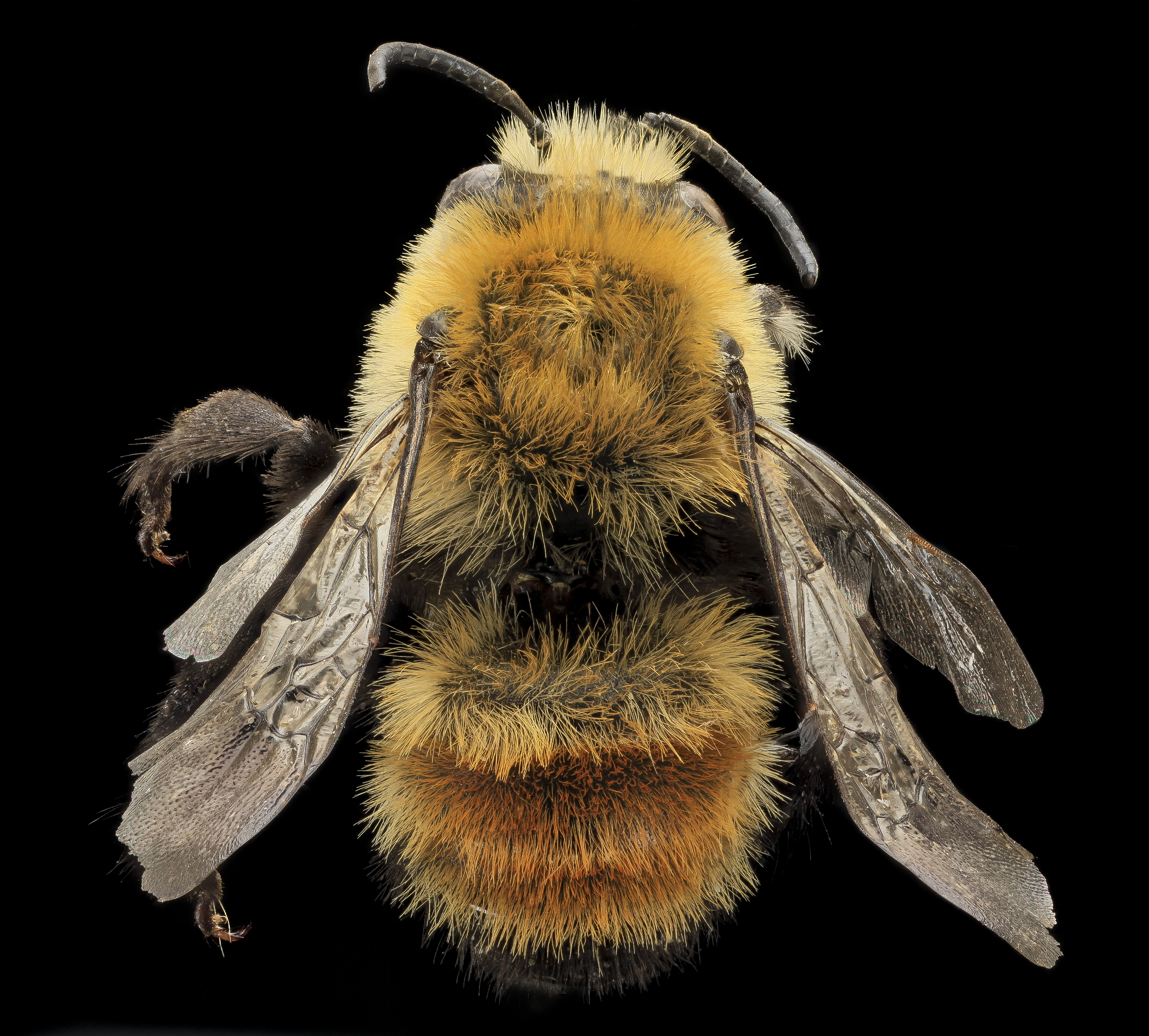

Scientific classification
- Kingdom: Animalia
- Phylum: Arthropoda
- Clade: Pancrustacea
- Class: Insecta
- Order: Hymenoptera
- Family: Apidae
- Genus: Anthophora
- Species: A. bomboides

Binomial name
- Anthophora bomboides Kirby, 1837

= Anthophora bomboides =

Species of bee

Anthophora bomboides is a species of anthophorine bee in the family Apidae. It is found in North America. It is a solitary ground nesting bee that is generally uncommon but has been found in populations around 400,000. It participates in Batesian mimicry, imitating the coloring of more dangerous bumblebees (hence the name Bomboides from the genus name Bombus). They are active August to June.

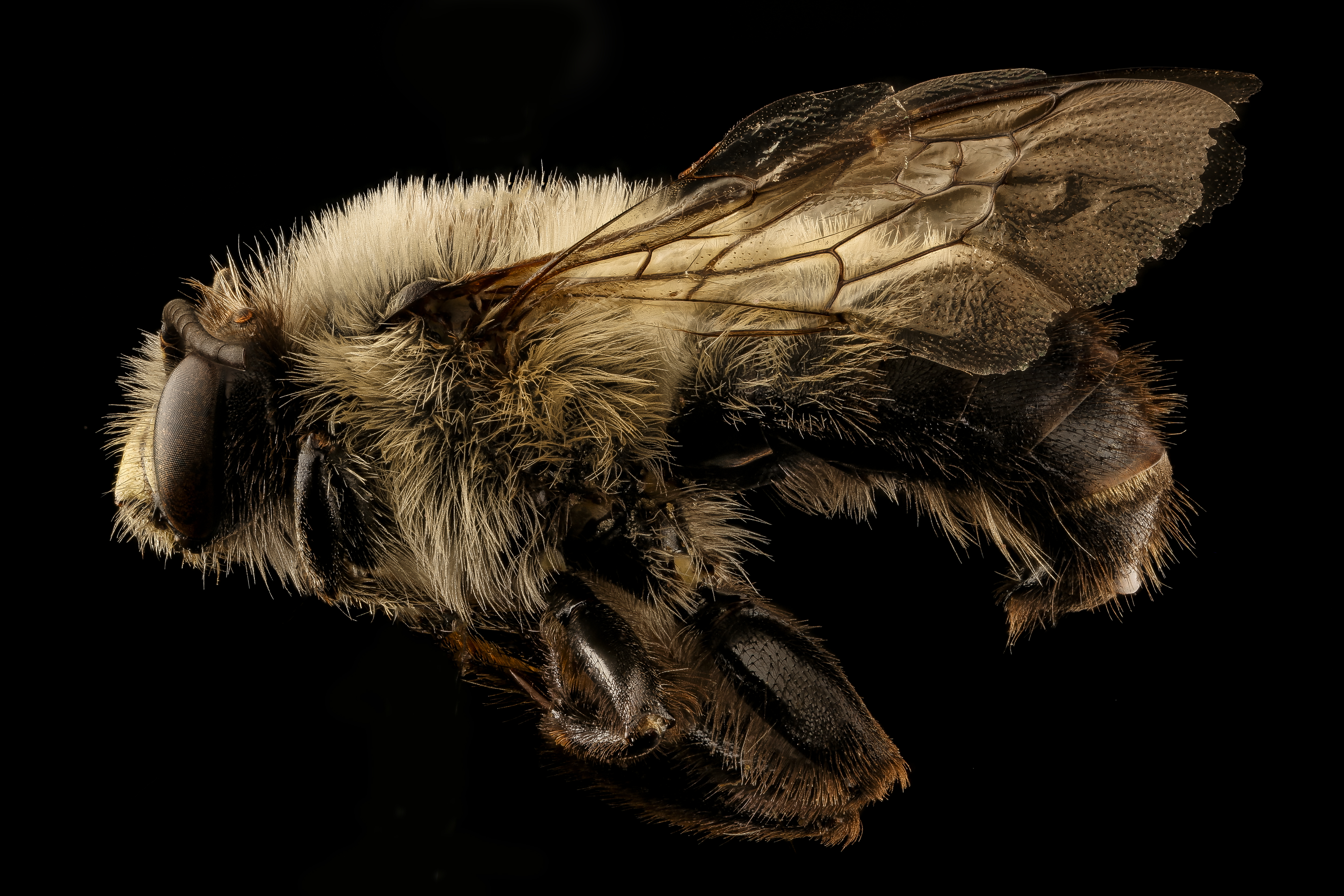
Bumble-bee-mimic anthophora, Anthophora bomboides

== Subspecies ==
These two subspecies belong to the species Anthophora bomboides:

- Anthophora bomboides bomboides
- Anthophora bomboides neomexicana Cockerell
