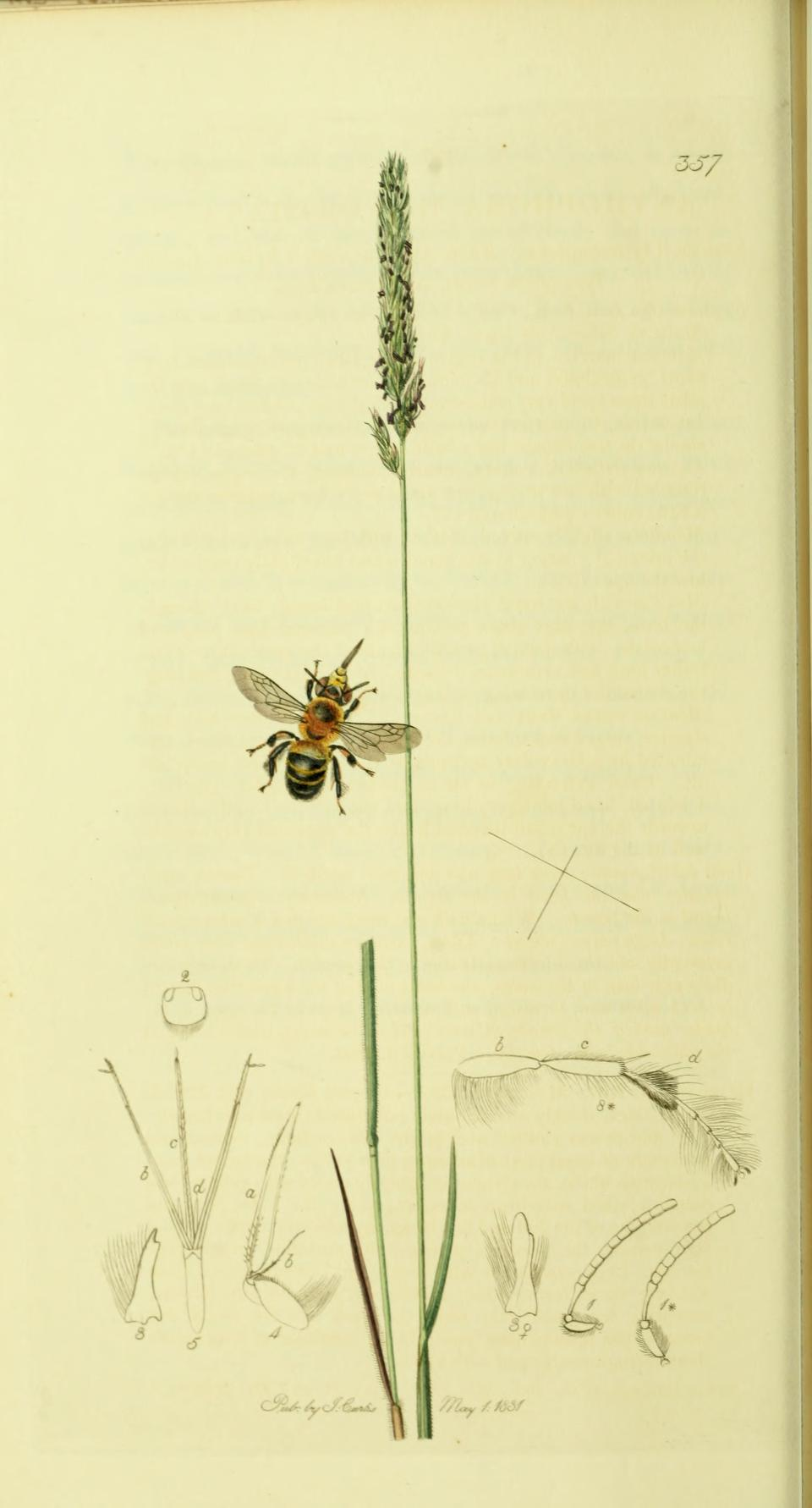

Scientific classification
- Kingdom: Animalia
- Phylum: Arthropoda
- Class: Insecta
- Order: Hymenoptera
- Family: Apidae
- Genus: Anthophora
- Species: A. retusa

Binomial name
- Anthophora retusa (Linnaeus, 1758)

Synonyms
- Anthophora monacha Anthophora haworthana Anthophora pennipes Apis retusa

= Anthophora retusa =

Species of bee

Anthophora retusa, the potter flower bee, is a species of solitary digger bee.

== Distribution ==
A. retusa is generally found in Western Europe and southern Sweden. In the United Kingdom, A. retusa is thought to be limited to five sites, including Seaford Head Nature Reserve.

== Identification ==
A. retusa can be differentiated from Anthophora plumipes by the hind-tibial spurs; in A. plumipes they are black while in A. retusa they are yellow or yellow-brown.

== Habitat ==
A. retusa prefers sandy soils and is generally found on coastal dunes and cliffs as well as inland on commons and heathlands.

== Population ==
A. retusa has suffered population decline since the Second World War but undergone rapid decline since the 1990s, similar to that seen in some bumblebee species. It is an endangered species in Britain.
