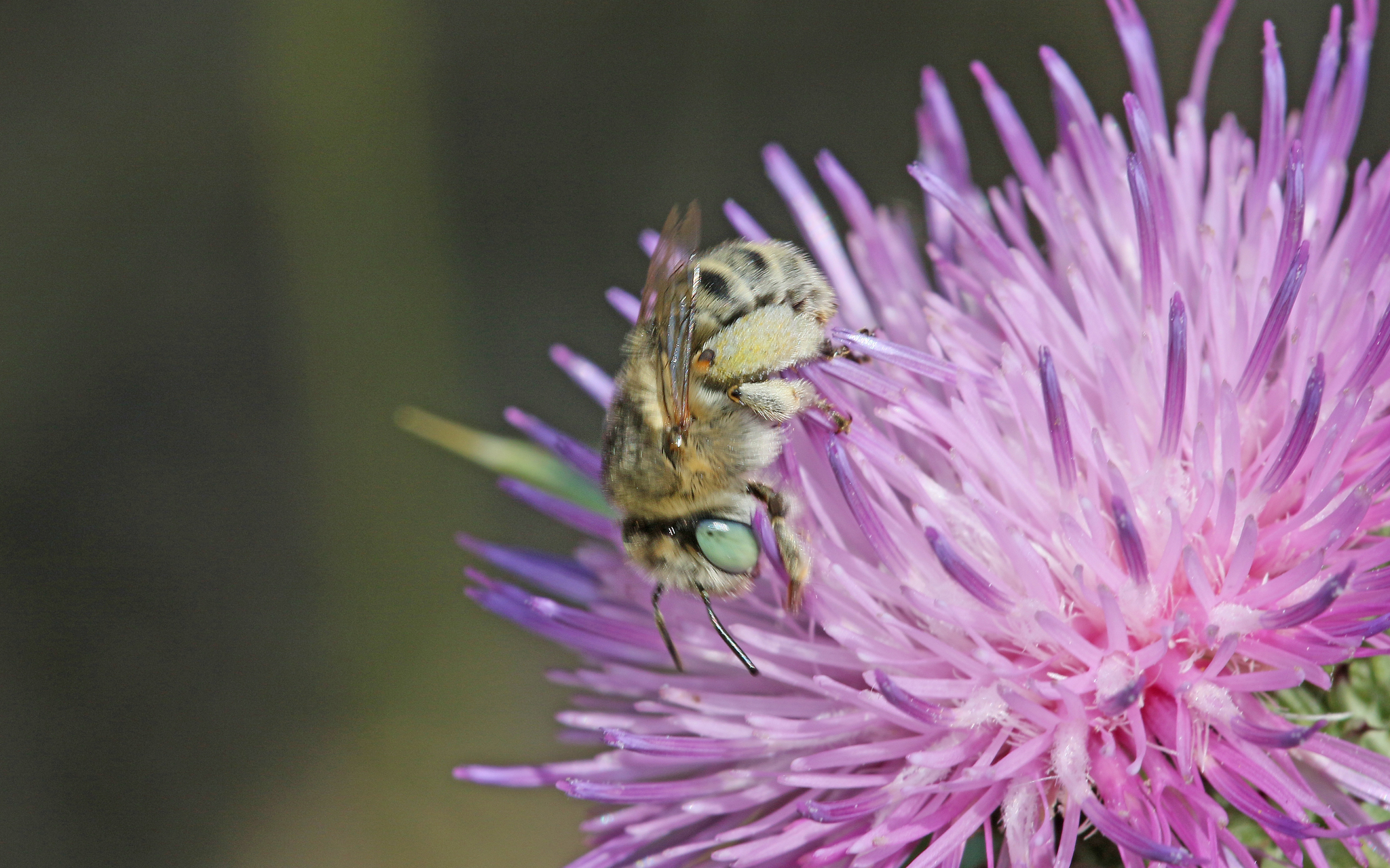
- Green-eyed flower bee (Anthophora bimaculata), Neusiedl am See, Burgenland, Austria

Scientific classification
- Kingdom: Animalia
- Phylum: Arthropoda
- Clade: Pancrustacea
- Class: Insecta
- Order: Hymenoptera
- Family: Apidae
- Genus: Anthophora
- Species: A. bimaculata

Binomial name
- Anthophora bimaculata (Panzer, 1798)

Synonyms
- Anthophora saropoda Lamarck, 1817; Anthophora squalida Lepeletier, 1841; Apis bimaculata Panzer, 1798; Apis rotundata Panzer, 1798; Heliophila bimaculata (Panzer, 1798)

= Anthophora bimaculata =

Species of bee

Anthophora bimaculata (also called green-eyed flower bee) is a species of bee.

== Description ==
Anthophora bimaculata are 8–9 mm long. The male has narrow light tergite bandages, yellow face and normally hairy middle legs clearly visible in the field. The females are Clypeus yellow, but at the base with 2 large black spots, tergite 4 and 5 gray-yellow tomentose hairs, tergites with light hair ties in the field clearly recognizable. Both genders have olive green complex eyes and one very high, clearly perceptible flight sound. Knowing the habitat of a specimen is important for identifying A. bimaculata.

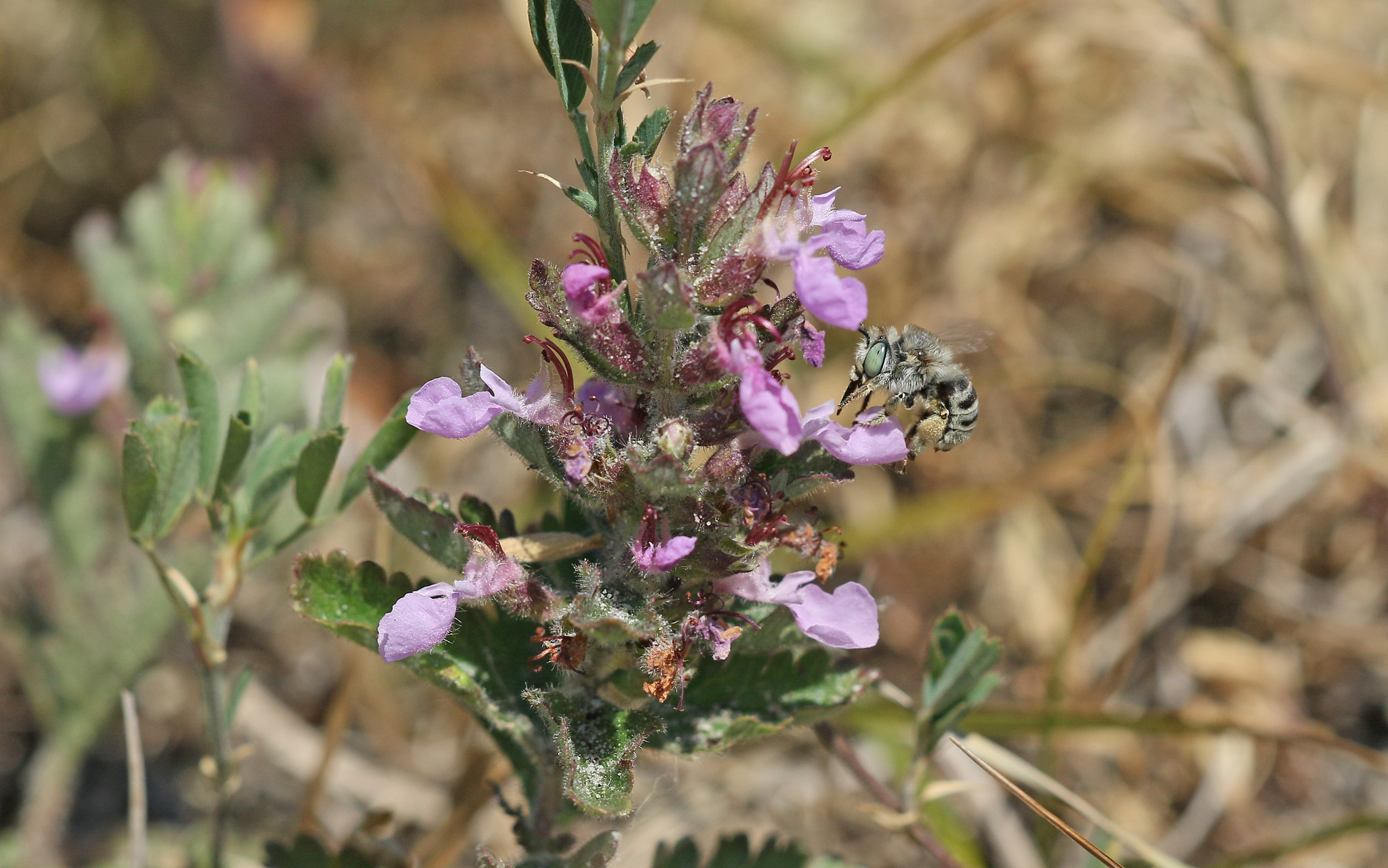
Green-eyed flower bee (Anthophora bimaculata), Neusiedl am See, Burgenland, Austria

== Range ==
A. bimaculata have been spotted in North Africa from Morocco to Libya; a report by FRIESE (1915) from Eritrea is questionable. They also live from Portugal through southern, central and eastern Europe, Ukraine and southern Russia to eastern Siberia (Central Baikal) and across Asia Minor and the Caucasus to Iran and Kyrgyzstan; north to Central England (allegedly also recently detected in Ireland), Denmark, Latvia, Kirov; south to Sicily (also on Corsica, no evidence from Sardinia), Albania, Bulgaria (no evidence from Greece, Israel and Iran).

A. Bimaculata live in central Europe in all regions in suitable habitats. Generally rare. In Germany from all federal states with the exception of Schleswig-Holstein up-to-date everywhere. Reported from all federal states in Austria with the exception of Salzburg, Tyrol and Vorarlberg. In Switzerland currently from Graubünden and Valais, historically from Lake Geneva, Lake Thun and Lake Biel as well as Ticino, Mesox and Domleschg.

== Habitat ==
A. bimaculata nests in sandy areas of lower locations: inland dunes and fields of drifting sand, sand pits, sandy embankments, ruderal areas, forest edges, and forest clearings. They nest on vegetation-free, flat surfaces or in small trailing edges. They nest only in fine and medium sands (such as drifting sand and weathered sand).

== Ecology ==
They nest in self-dug cavities in the earth. Their nests are found both in early succession stages with only little vegetation cover as also in late stages with heavy coverage. Their nests have been found in the root balls of silver grass clusters. The main tunnel of the nest is 4–5 cm long deep in the ground. Under favorable conditions, they are found in small to large aggregations.

A. bimaculata is a polylectic species, collecting pollen from 8 known plant families). Their known pollen sources are, in Asteraceae: Centaurea scabiosa, Centaurea stoebe, Cirsium vulgare, Picris hieracioides, Hypochoeris radicata; in Boraginaceae: Echium vulgare, Anchuso officinalis; in Campanulaceae: Trifolium arvense; in Hypericaceae: Hypericum perforatum; Lamiaceae: Teucrium scorodonia; in Lythraceae: Lythrum salicaria; and in Rosaceae: Potentilla incana. Except for the Hypericum species, all of the above serve both sexes as sources of nectar. Within the pollen loads 3 or 4 different types of pollen can be found. The field observations also showed that the flower visits on a pollen-collecting flight are randomly strung together, depending on the offer.

Ammobates punctatus and Coelioxys rufescens, known as cuckoo bees, are parasites of A. bimaculata. In England Coelioxys elongata was also observed on the nests.

They are a Univoltine species, laying one brood per year. They have a flight period from the beginning of July to the end of August, wintering as a resting larva.

== Etymology ==
From Latin bi- "=" two "and" maculata "=" speckled ".

== Taxonomy ==
Subgenus Heliophila KLUG, 1807.

Synonyms: Saropoda rotundata (PANZER, 1798); Heliophila bimaculata (PANZER, 1798).
