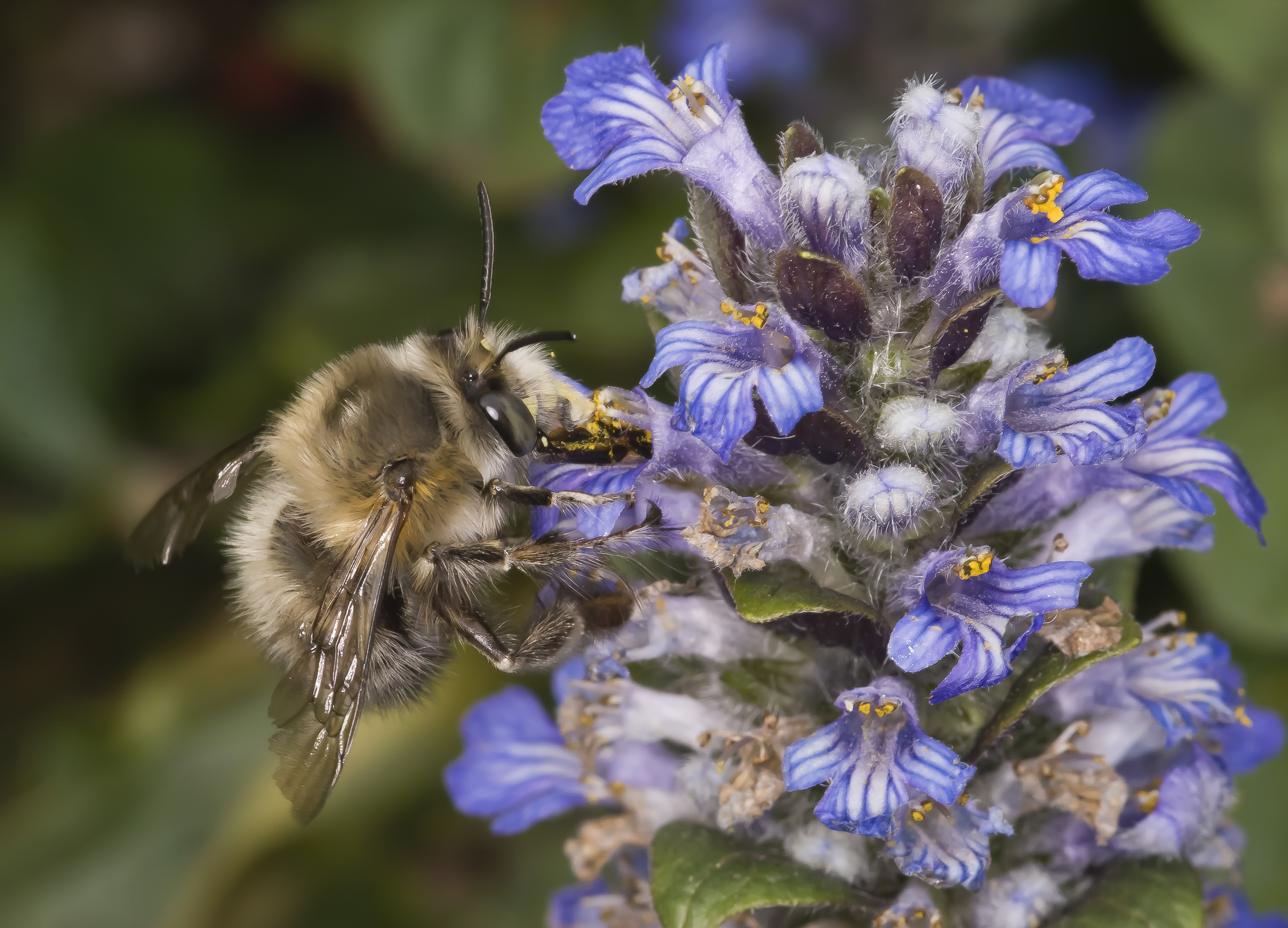
- male

Scientific classification
- Domain: Eukaryota
- Kingdom: Animalia
- Phylum: Arthropoda
- Class: Insecta
- Order: Hymenoptera
- Family: Apidae
- Genus: Anthophora
- Species: A. plumipes

Binomial name
- Anthophora plumipes (Pallas, 1772)

Synonyms
- List: Apis acervorum Linnaeus 1758; Apis pilipes Fabricius 1775; Apis hirsuta Fabricius 1787; Apis rufipes Christ 1791; Apis palmipes Rossi 1792; Anthophora nigrofulva Lepeletier 1841; Anthophora pennata Lepeletier 1841; Anthophora sicula Smith 1854; Anthophora villosula Smith 1854; Anthophora acervorum squalens Dours 1869; Podalirius acervorum albipes Friese 1896; Podalirius acervorum niger Friese 1896; Podalirius acervorum nigripes Friese 1896; Anthophora soror Pérez 1905; Anthophora acervorum dimidiata Alfken 1913; Anthophora acervorum intermixta Alfken 1913; Anthophora pingshiangensis Strand 1913; Podalirius acervorum varians Friese 1922; Anthophora acervorum lisbonensis Cockerell 1922; Anthophora acervorum palestinensis Hedicke 1936; Anthophora acervorum cypriaca Mavromoustakis 1957

= Anthophora plumipes =

Species of bee

The hairy-footed flower bee (Anthophora plumipes) is a species of bee belonging to the family Apidae.

== Distribution ==
These bees are widespread in most of Europe and Asia from Britain to China and Japan, the Near East and in North Africa. In the 20th century, the species was introduced to the United States. The species was spotted for the first time in Ireland in April 2022.

== Habitat ==
These bees commonly inhabit gardens, open woodland, and coastal sites.

== Description ==
The adults of Anthophora plumipes grow up to 13–15 millimetres (0.5–0.6 in) long. There are numerous color forms over the species' geographic range, which have resulted in this species being described under many different names. This species shows an evident sexual dimorphism. The body is always densely hairy. Males have most often bright reddish brown or gray hair, while females are usually all black or dark brown. Furthermore, the females show reddish orange scopal hairs on the hind tibia. The middle legs of males are very elongated. Males are also distinguished from females by having long hairs on its mid tarsi and the integument of the lower face yellow or cream coloured, rather than black. The long tufts of black hairs on the tarsi (hence the Latin word plumipes) are active during mating, but their precise purpose is unknown.

== Biology ==
Anthophora plumipes is a univoltine species. These bees can be encountered from March to June, feeding and collecting pollen and nectar on early flowering plants, mainly on (Primulaceae species (Primula veris, Primula acaulis, etc.), Boraginaceae species (Pulmonaria officinalis, Borago officinalis, etc.), Lamiaceae species (Lamium purpureum) and Fumariaceae (Corydalis spp.).

These solitary bees do not build colonies. The females usually make nests in clay slopes and steep walls of mud, where they excavate cells, which they fill with pollen and nectar (as food for the larvae), laying a single egg on each pollen mass.

== Gallery ==
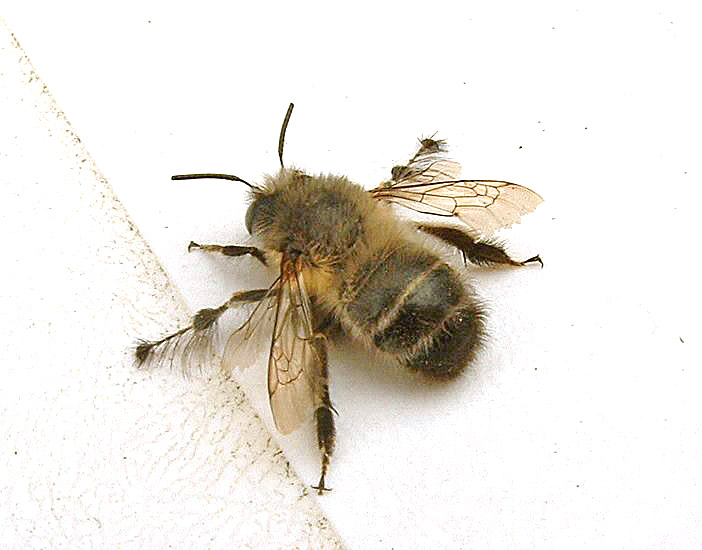
Male, dorsal view

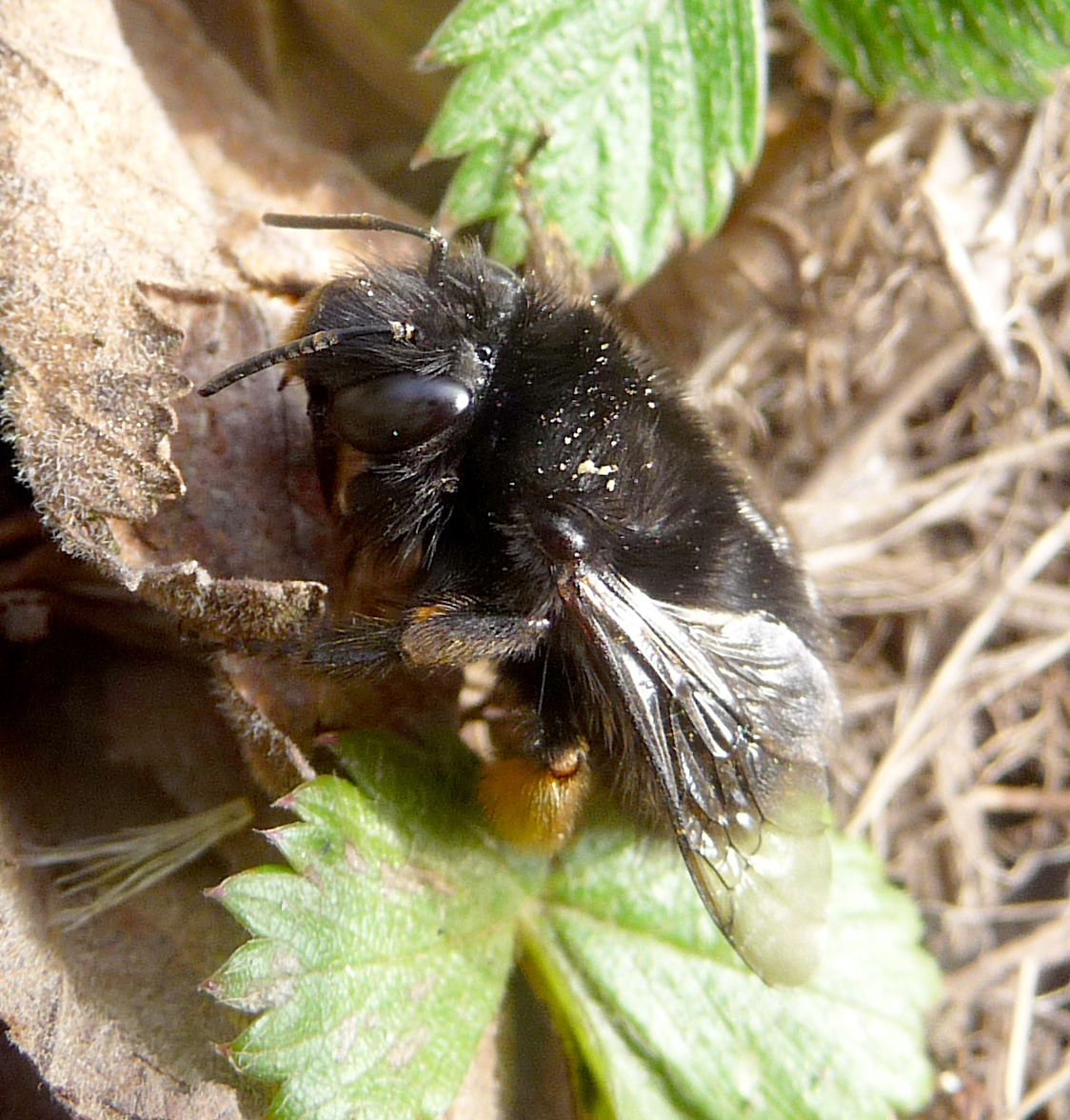
Female

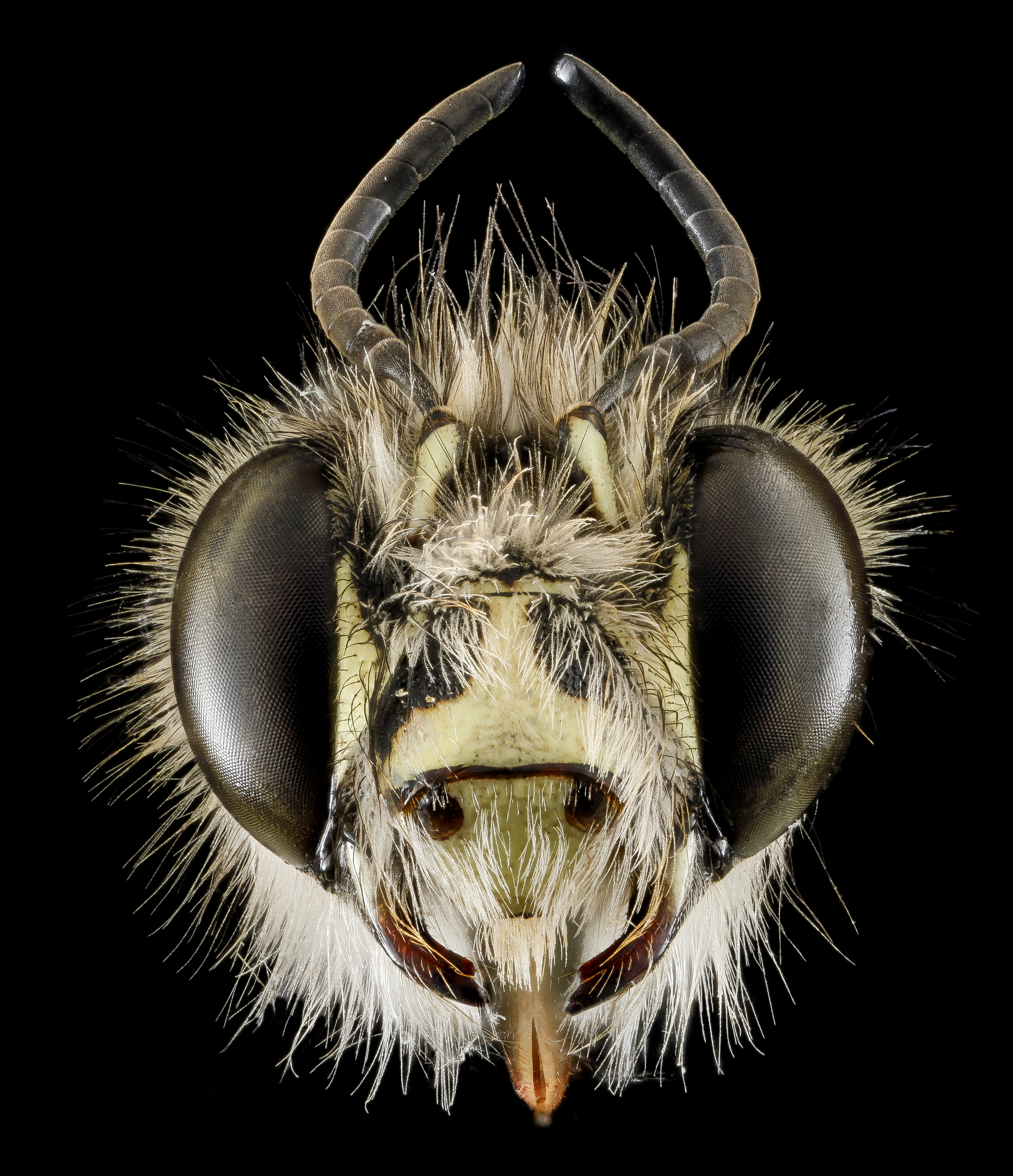
Head of a male

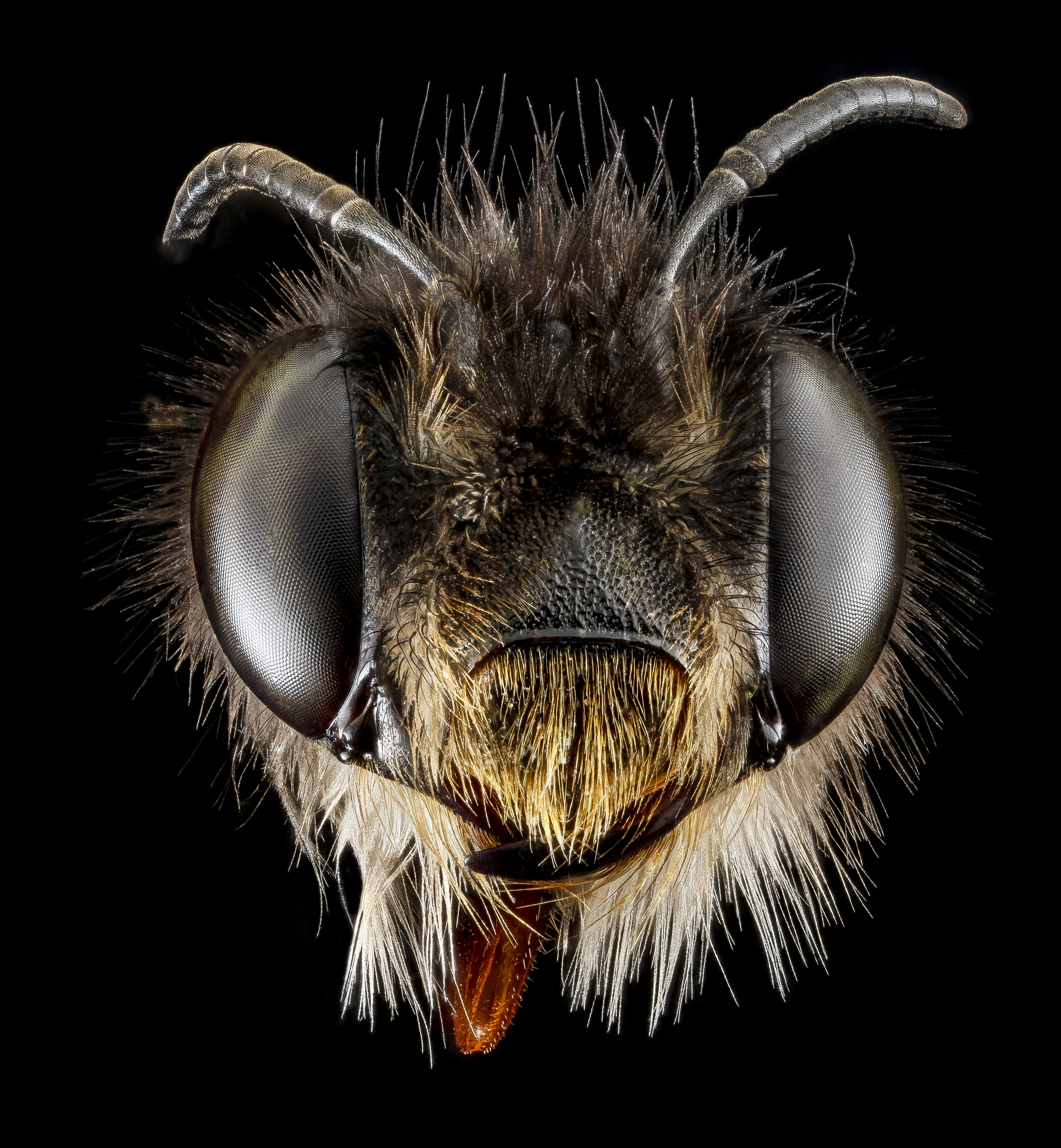
Head of a female

== Bibliography ==
- Michener C.D., The Bees of the World, Johns Hopkins University Press, 2000, ISBN 0-8018-6133-0.
- Stone G.N, Female foraging responses to sexual harassment in the solitary bee Anthophora plumipes, in Anim. Behav. 1995; 50: 405–412.
- Heiko Bellmann, Guide des abeilles, bourdons, guêpes et fourmis d'Europe, Delachaux et Niestlé, 1999, 336 p.
