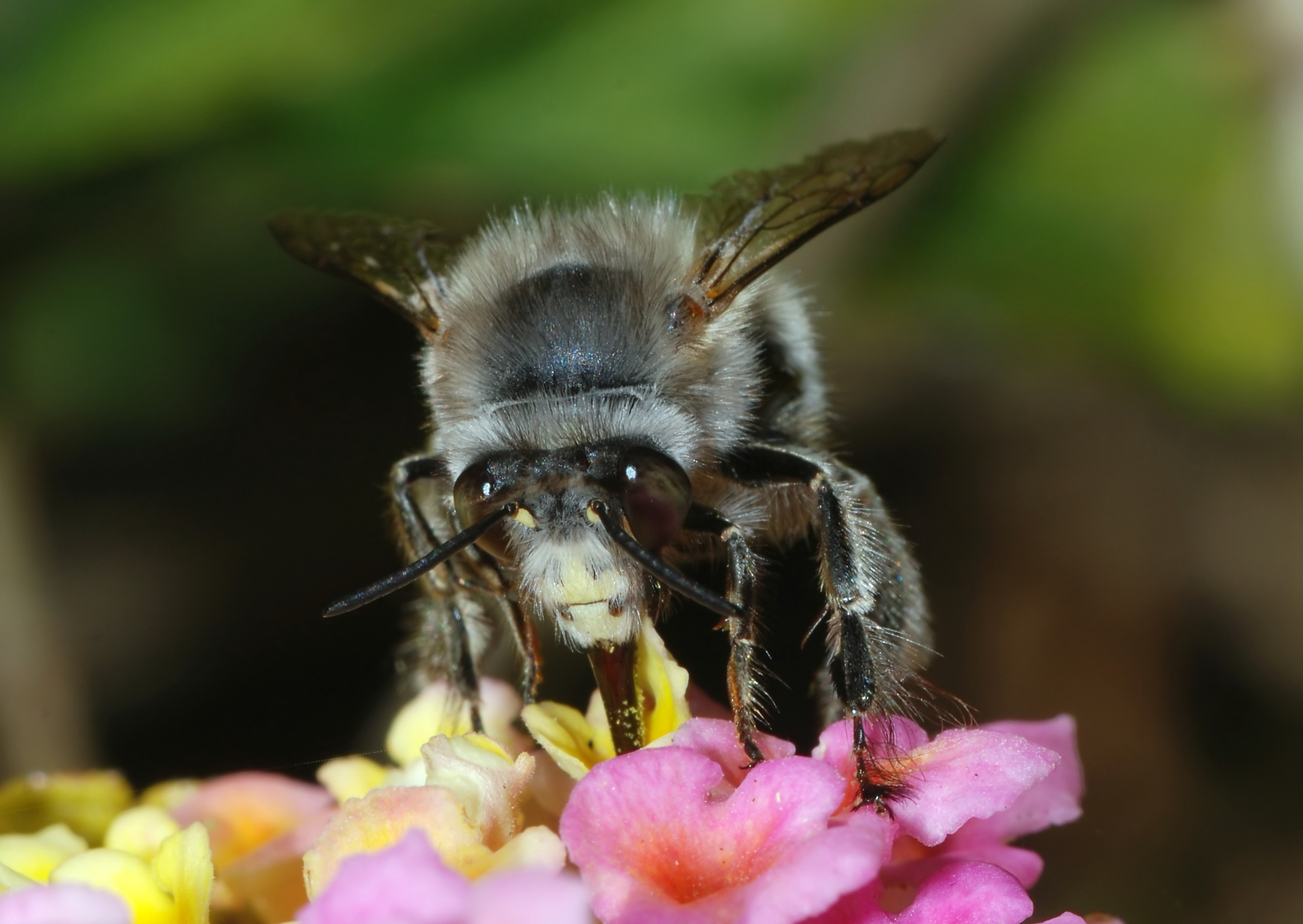
- Anthophora sp.

Scientific classification
- Kingdom: Animalia
- Phylum: Arthropoda
- Clade: Pancrustacea
- Class: Insecta
- Order: Hymenoptera
- Family: Apidae
- Tribe: Anthophorini
- Genus: Anthophora; Latreille, 1803

= Anthophora =

Genus of bees

The bee genus Anthophora is one of the largest in the family Apidae, with over 450 species worldwide in 14 different subgenera. They are most abundant and diverse in the Holarctic and African biogeographic regions. All species are solitary, though many nest in large aggregations. Nearly all species make nests in the soil, either in banks or in flat ground; the larvae develop in cells with waterproof linings and do not spin cocoons. Males commonly have pale white or yellow facial markings, and/or peculiarly modified leg armature and hairs. Anthophora individuals can be distinguished from the very similar genus Amegilla by the possession of an arolium between the tarsal claws.

Species include:

- Anthophora abrupta
- Anthophora bomboides
- Anthophora bimaculata
- Anthophora californica
- Anthophora curta
- Anthophora dispar
- Anthophora edwardsii
- Anthophora fedorica
- Anthophora flexipes
- Anthophora furcata
- Anthophora occidentalis
- Anthophora plumipes
- Anthophora pueblo
- Anthophora retusa
- Anthophora urbana

== See also ==
- List of Anthophora species
