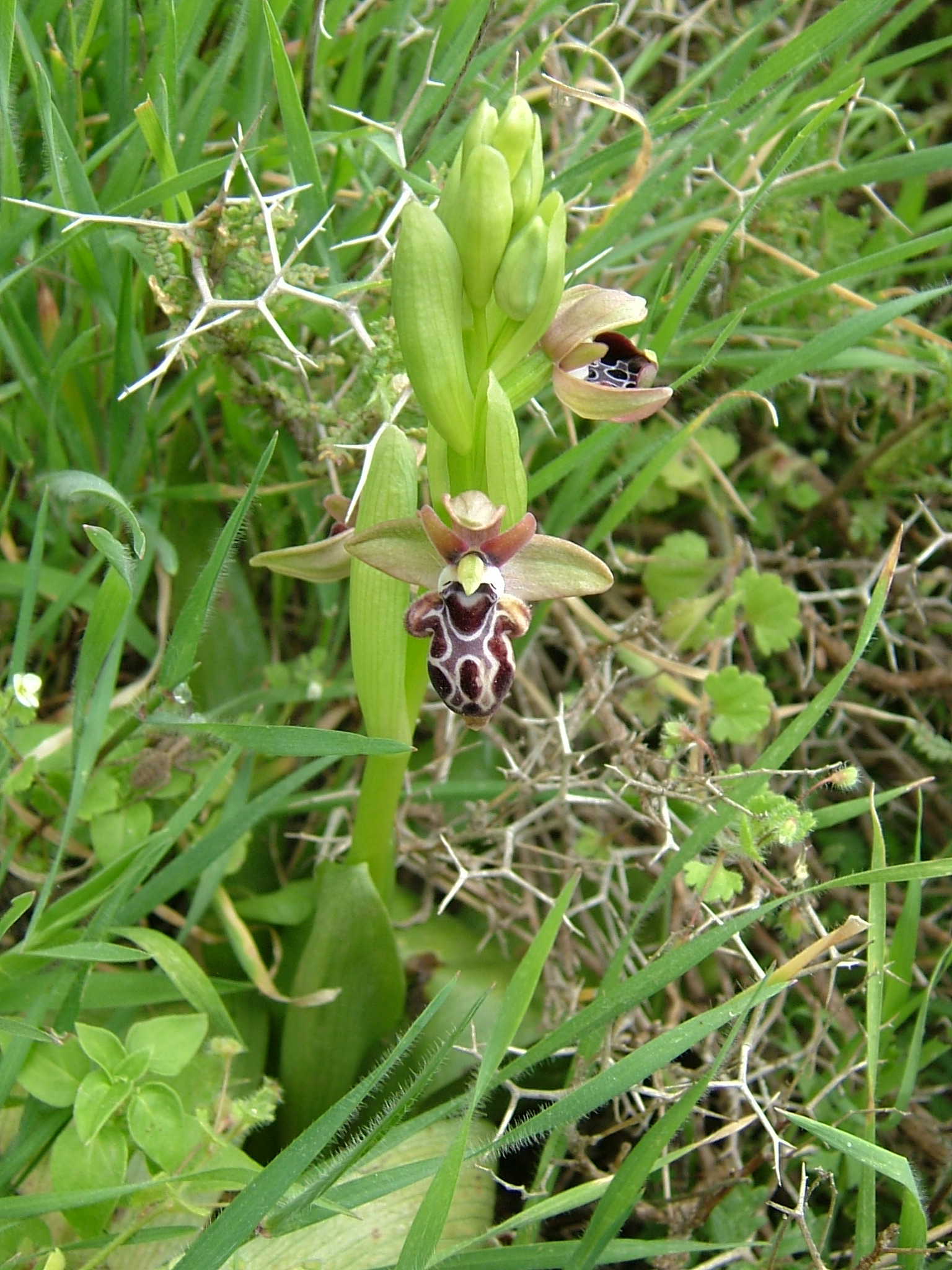

Scientific classification
- Kingdom: Plantae
- Clade: Tracheophytes
- Clade: Angiosperms
- Clade: Monocots
- Order: Asparagales
- Family: Orchidaceae
- Subfamily: Orchidoideae
- Genus: Ophrys
- Species: O. kotschyi

Binomial name
- Ophrys kotschyi H.Fleischm. & Soó

Synonyms
- Ophrys sintenisii subsp. kotschyi (H.Fleischm. & Soó) Soó; Ophrys cypria Renz

= Ophrys kotschyi =

Cyprus bee orchid

Species of orchid

Ophrys kotschyi, the Cyprus bee orchid or Kotschy's ophrys, is a terrestrial species of orchid native to south-western Turkey and Cyprus. Ophrys kotschyi occurs in grasslands and in open pine woodlands. It is listed as "near-threatened" by the International Union for Conservation of Nature.

== Subspecies ==
Two subspecies that were formerly recognized, Ophrys kotschyi subsp. ariadnae and Ophrys kotschyi subsp. cretica, are now placed in a separate species, Ophrys cretica. This had been suggested in a 2011 molecular phylogenetic study. As of September 2025, Plants of the World Online accepted no subspecies of Ophrys kotschyi.

== Ecology ==
Ophrys kotschyi is pollinated by anthophorine bees of the genus Melecta.

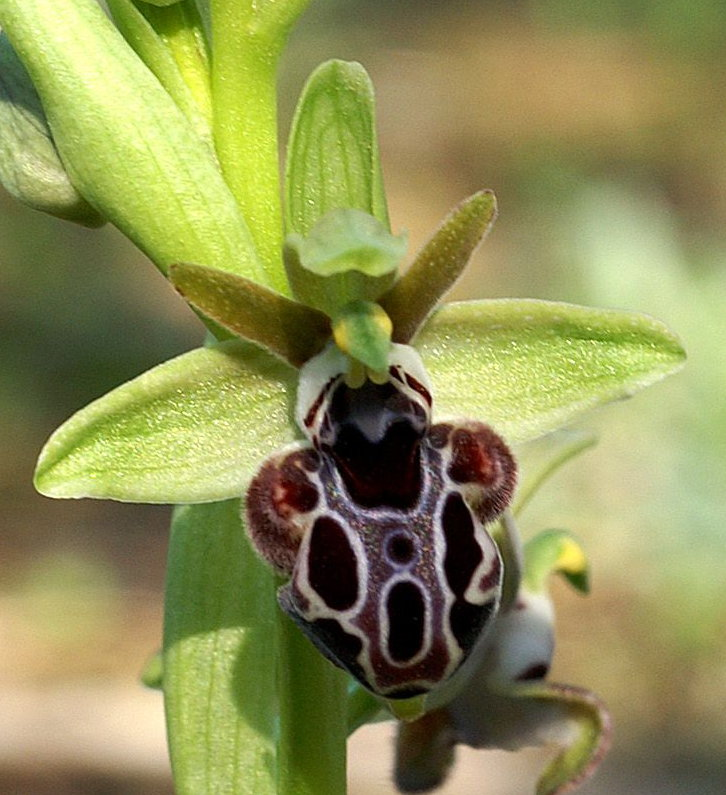
Flower of O. kotschyi from Cyprus

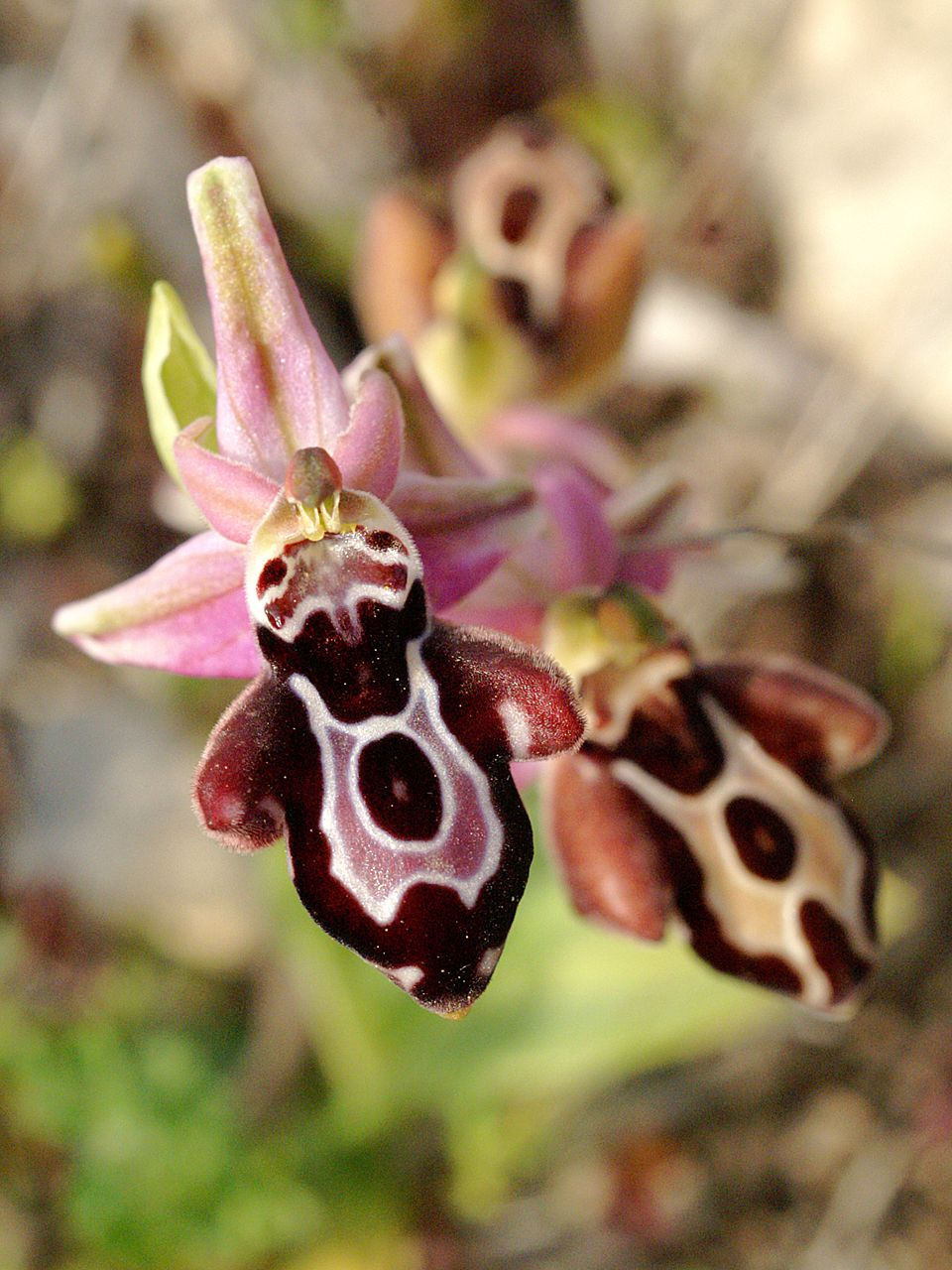
Flower of the somewhat similar O. cretica, from Rhodes
