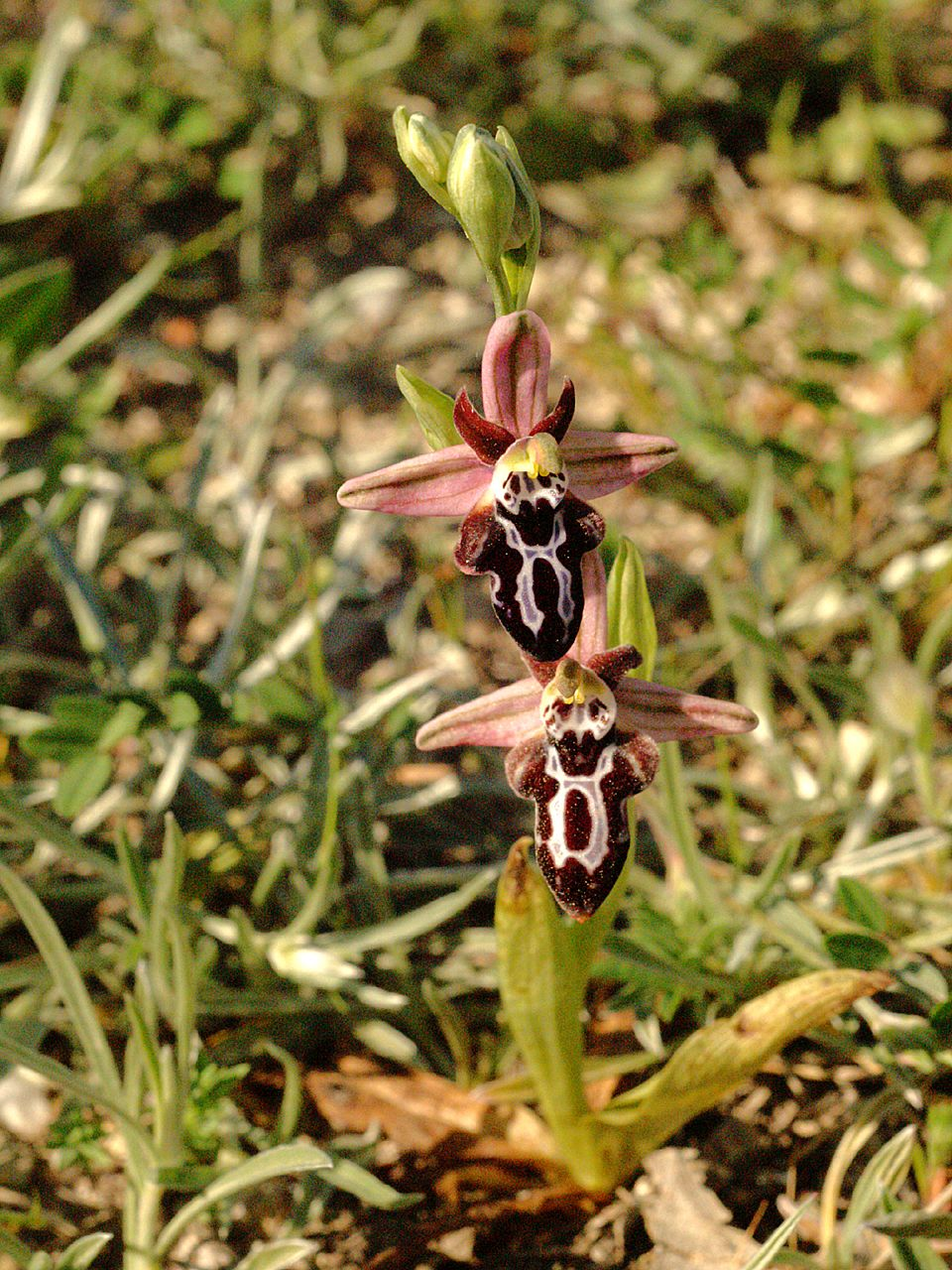
- In habitat in Rhodes

Scientific classification
- Kingdom: Plantae
- Clade: Tracheophytes
- Clade: Angiosperms
- Clade: Monocots
- Order: Asparagales
- Family: Orchidaceae
- Subfamily: Orchidoideae
- Genus: Ophrys
- Species: O. cretica

Binomial name
- Ophrys cretica (Vierh.) E.Nelson

Synonyms
- List: Ophrys ariadnae Paulus; Ophrys beloniae (G.Kretzschmar & H.Kretzschmar) Devillers & Devillers-Tersch.; Ophrys cretica subsp. ariadnae (Paulus) H.Kretzschmar; Ophrys cretica var. ariadnae (Paulus) Hennecke; Ophrys cretica f. beloniae (G.Kretzschmar & H.Kretzschmar) P.Delforge; Ophrys cretica subsp. beloniae G.Kretzschmar & H.Kretzschmar; Ophrys cretica f. bicornuta (H.Kretzschmar & R.L.Jahn) P.Delforge; Ophrys cretica subsp. bicornuta H.Kretzschmar & R.L.Jahn; Ophrys cretica subsp. karpathensis E.Nelson; Ophrys cretica subsp. naxia E.Nelson; Ophrys doerfleri H.Fleischm.; Ophrys kotschyi subsp. ariadnae (Paulus) Faurh.; Ophrys kotschyi subsp. cretica (Vierh.) H.Sund.; Ophrys naxensis Rech.; Ophrys spruneri f. cretica Vierh.; Ophrys spruneri subsp. cretica (Vierh.) Renz; Ophrys spruneri var. cretica (Vierh.) Soó; Ophrys spruneri f. syriaca G.Keller

= Ophrys cretica =

Species of plant

Ophrys cretica is a species of flowering plant in the family Orchidaceae, native to Crete, the East Aegean Islands, and mainland Greece. It has been included in Ophrys kotschyi, as either one or two subspecies.

== Description ==
Ophrys cretica grows to 10 to 40 cm (4 to 16 in) tall. It has two to ten flowers in a spike, that may be lax or dense. The sepals are green to brownish violet in colour; the lateral sepals may be bicoloured, green above the midline and brownish violet below. The lip or labellum is generally about as long as it is wide, in the range 10–16 mm (0.4–0.6 in). Its base colour is dark brown to purple black. The speculum or mirror is roughly H-shaped, but frequently with more complex embellishments. The upper part reaches the base of the lip. The central parts of the speculum are greyish violet to reddish brown; the whole has a white border.

== Taxonomy ==
The species was first described by Friedrich K. M. Vierhapper in 1916 as Ophrys spruneri f. cretica. In 1962, Erich Nelson raised it to the full species, Ophrys cretica. Others later treated it as one or two subspecies of O. kotschyi (subspecies cretica or subspecies ariadne and cretica). As of September 2025, Plants of the World Online accepted it as an independent species.

== Distribution and habitat ==
Ophrys cretica is native to Crete, the East Aegean Islands north to Chios, and the southeast of mainland Greece (Attica, Aigina, and the Peloponnese). It is found on calcareous soils from sea level to altitudes of up to 1,000 m (3,300 ft). Typical habitats include grassland, garrigue, and pesticide-free olive groves.

== Ecology ==
Like O. kotschyi, which has similarly coloured and patterned flowers, O. cretica is pollinated by bees of the genus Melecta, particularly M. albifrons and M. tuberculata.

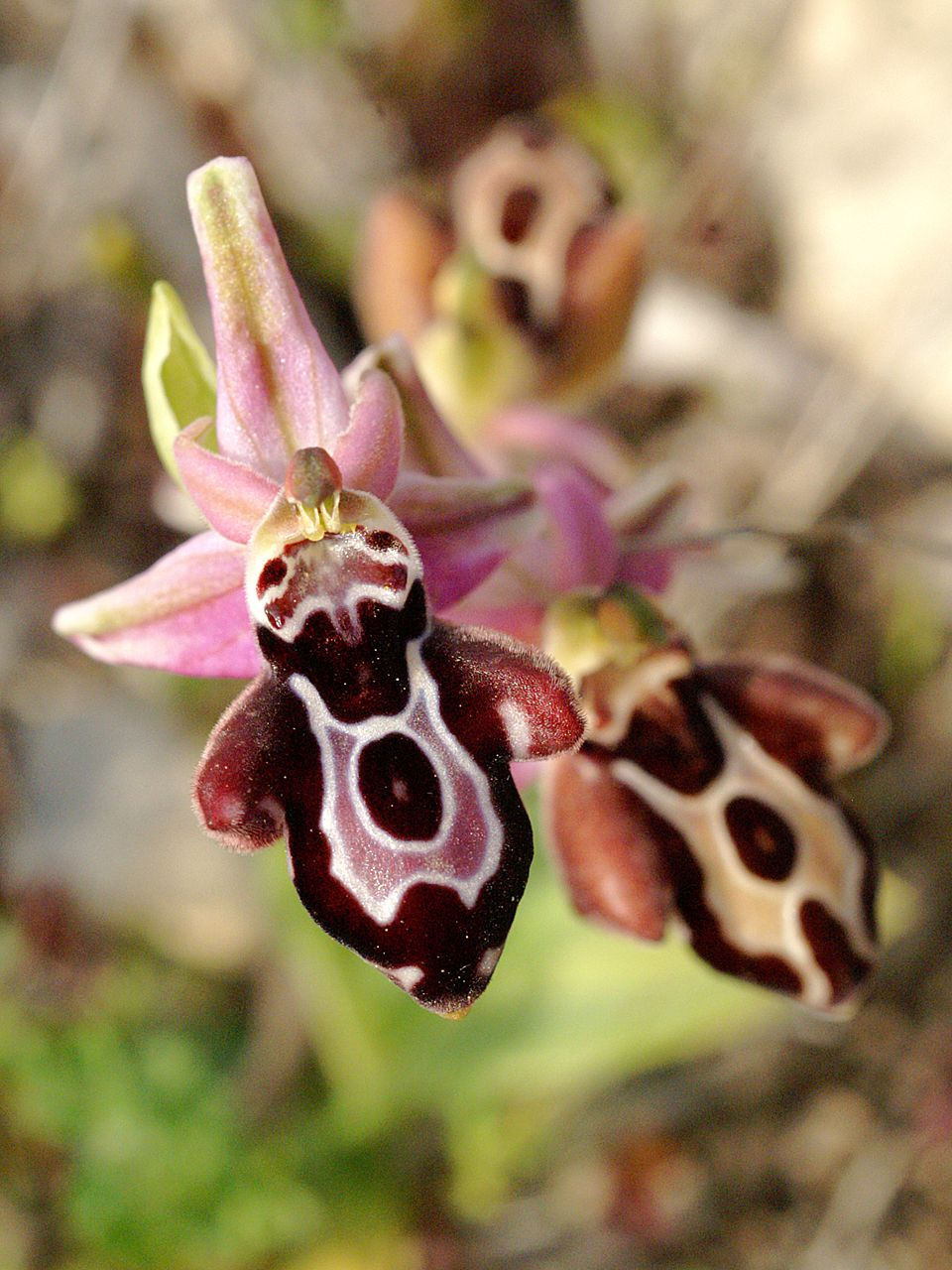
Flower, from Rhodes

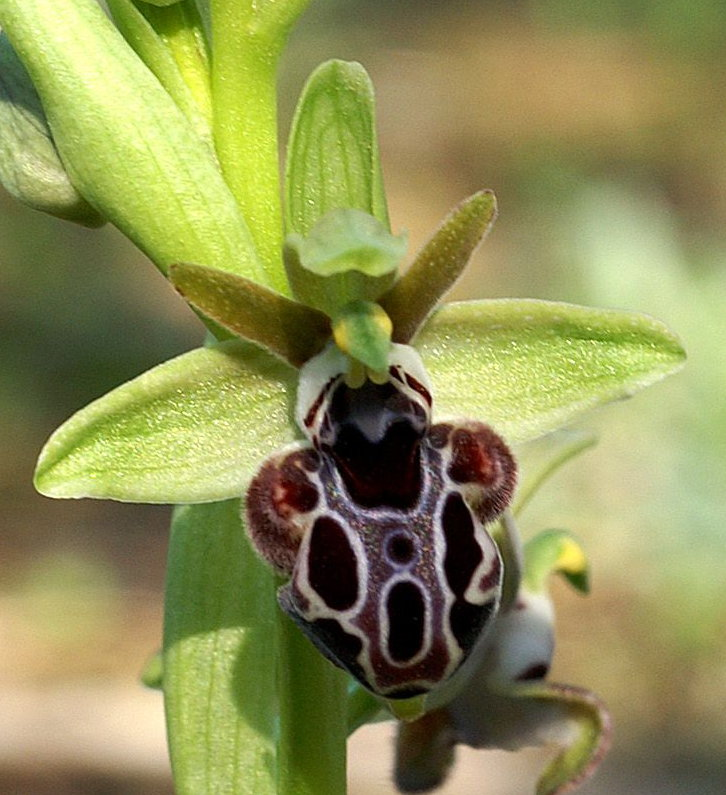
Flower of the somewhat similar Ophrys kotschyi, from Cyprus
