= Melecta separata =

Scientific classification
- Domain: Eukaryota
- Kingdom: Animalia
- Phylum: Arthropoda
- Class: Insecta
- Order: Hymenoptera
- Family: Apidae
- Genus: Melecta
- Species: M. separata

Binomial name
- Melecta separata Cresson, 1879

Species of insect

Melecta separata is a species of hymenopteran in the family Apidae. It is found in North America.

== Subspecies ==
These six subspecies belong to the species Melecta separata:

- Melecta separata alfredi (Cockerell, 1895)
- Melecta separata arizonica (Cockerell, 1902)
- Melecta separata callura (Cockerell, 1926)
- Melecta separata johnsoni (Cockerell, 1905)
- Melecta separata mojavensis Linsley, 1939
- Melecta separata separata Cresson, 1879
