= Melecta edwardsii =

Scientific classification
- Domain: Eukaryota
- Kingdom: Animalia
- Phylum: Arthropoda
- Class: Insecta
- Order: Hymenoptera
- Family: Apidae
- Genus: Melecta
- Species: M. edwardsii

Binomial name
- Melecta edwardsii Cresson, 1878

Species of bee

Melecta edwardsii, or Edward's melectum, is a species of digger-cuckoo bee in the family Apidae. It is found in Central America and North America.
