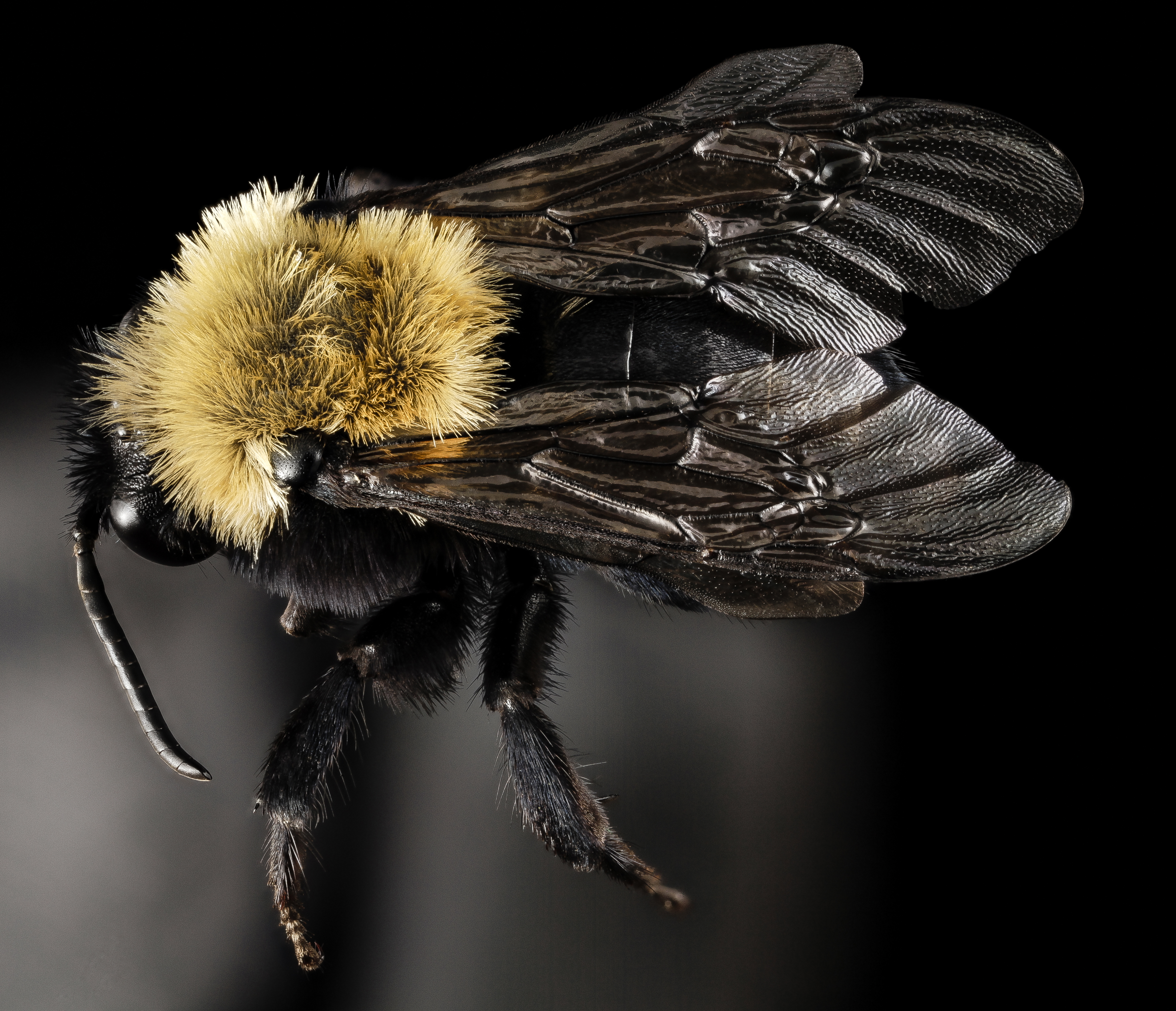

Scientific classification
- Domain: Eukaryota
- Kingdom: Animalia
- Phylum: Arthropoda
- Class: Insecta
- Order: Hymenoptera
- Family: Apidae
- Genus: Melecta
- Species: M. pacifica

Binomial name
- Melecta pacifica Cresson, 1878

= Melecta pacifica =

Species of bee

Melecta pacifica is a species of hymenopteran in the family Apidae. It is found in North America.

== Subspecies ==
These three subspecies belong to the species Melecta pacifica:

- Melecta pacifica atlantica Linsley, 1943
- Melecta pacifica fulvida Cresson, 1878
- Melecta pacifica pacifica Cresson, 1878
