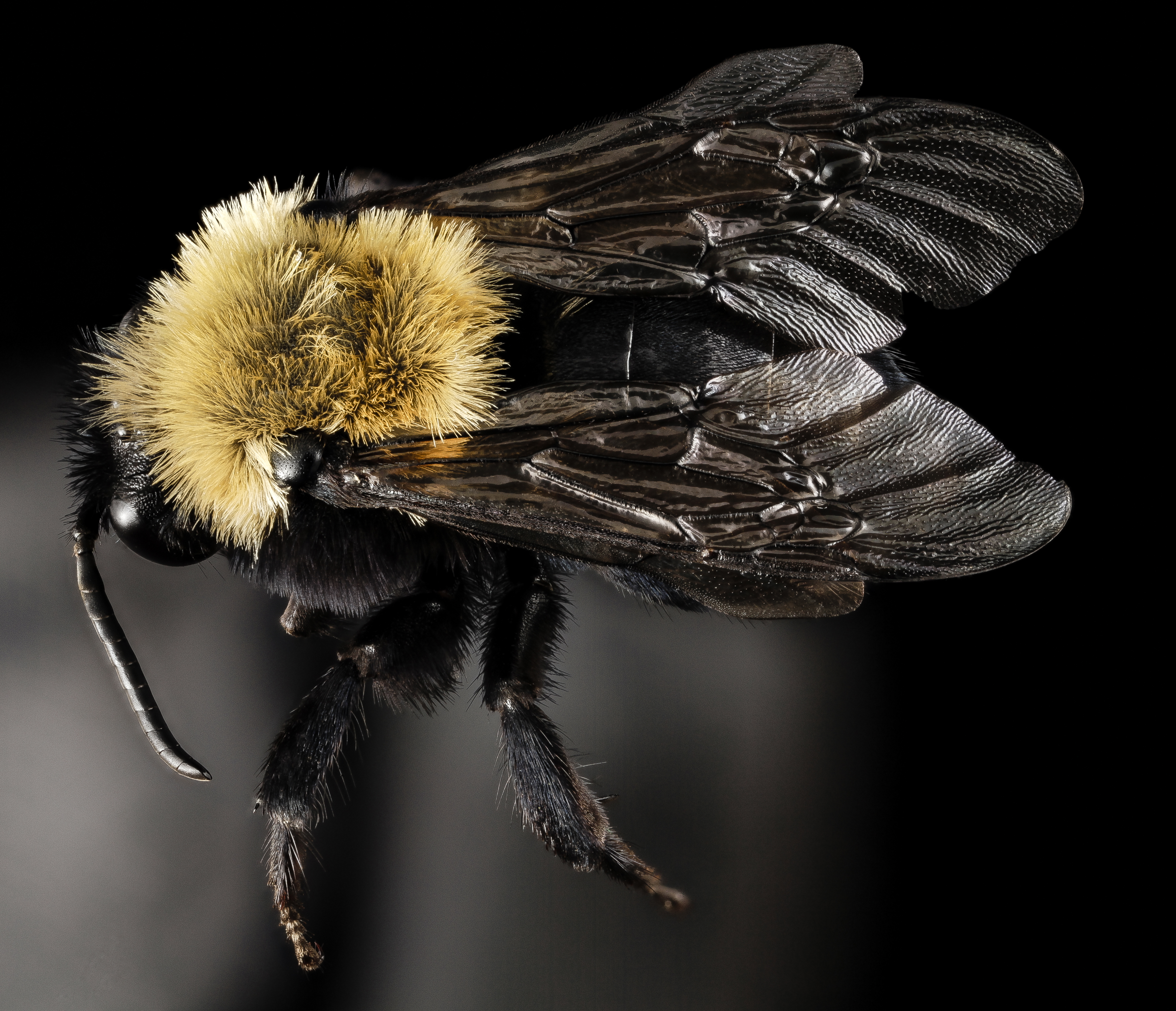
- Melecta pacifica

Scientific classification
- Kingdom: Animalia
- Phylum: Arthropoda
- Class: Insecta
- Order: Hymenoptera
- Family: Apidae
- Tribe: Melectini
- Genus: Melecta; Latreille, 1802

= Melecta =

Genus of bees

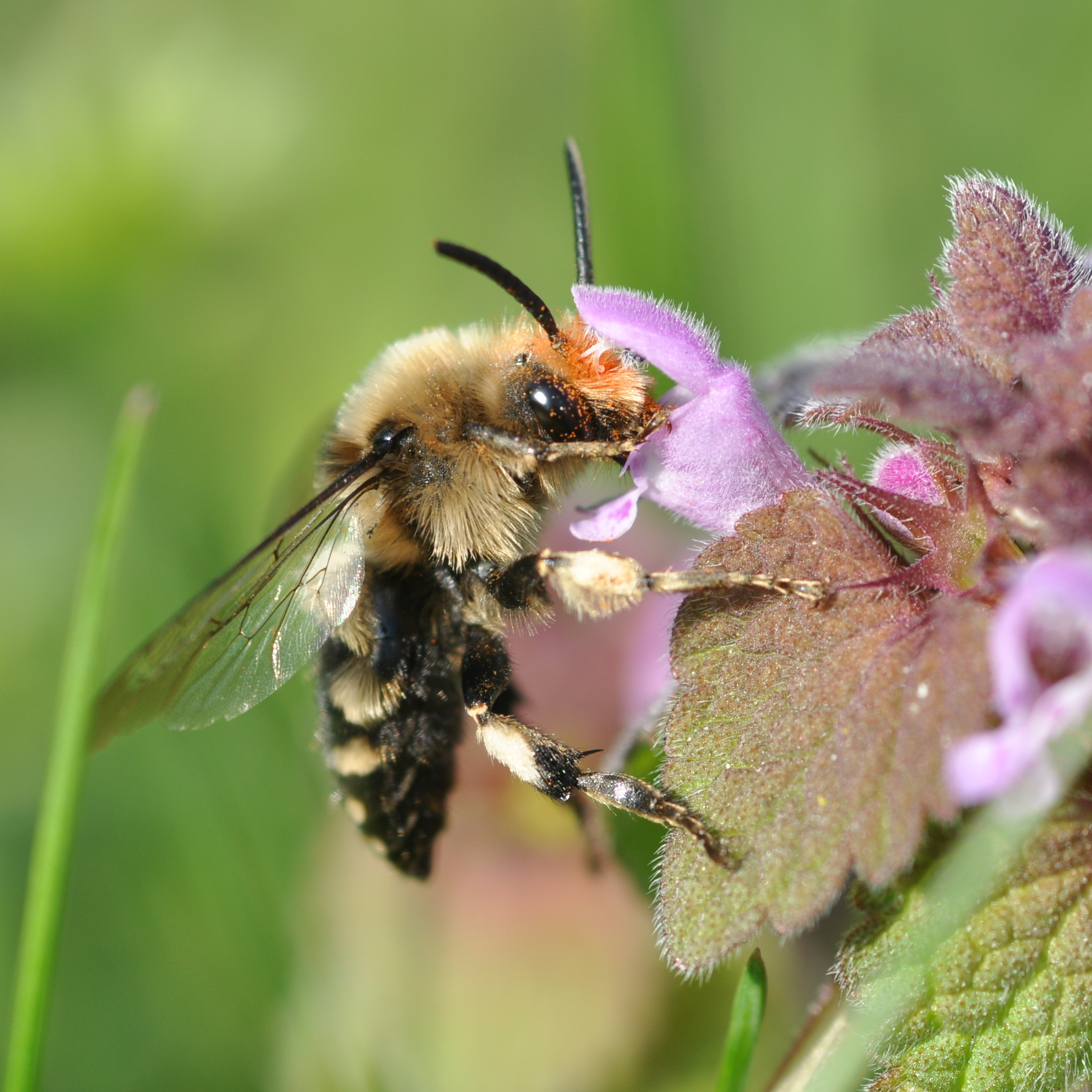
Melecta albifrons

Melecta is a genus of cuckoo bees in the family Apidae. There are at least 50 described species in Melecta.

== Species ==
These 55 species belong to the genus Melecta:

- Melecta aegyptiaca Radoszkowski, 1876^{i c g}
- Melecta albifrons (Forster, 1771)^{i c g}
- Melecta alcestis Lieftinck, 1980^{i c g}
- Melecta alexanderi Griswold & Parker, 1999^{i c g}
- Melecta amanda Lieftinck, 1980^{i c g}
- Melecta angustilabris Lieftinck, 1980^{i c g}
- Melecta assimilis Radoszkowski, 1876^{i c g}
- Melecta atripes Morawitz, 1895^{i c g}
- Melecta atroalba (Lieftinck, 1972)^{i c g}
- Melecta baeri Radoszkowski, 1865^{i c g}
- Melecta bohartorum Linsley, 1939^{i c g}
- Melecta brevipila Lieftinck, 1980^{i c g}
- Melecta canariensis Lieftinck, 1958^{i c g}
- Melecta candiae Strand, 1915^{g}
- Melecta candida Lieftinck, 1980^{i c g}
- Melecta caroli Lieftinck, 1958^{i c g}
- Melecta chalybeia (Lieftinck, 1972)^{i c g}
- Melecta chinensis Cockerell, 1931^{i c g}
- Melecta corpulenta Morawitz, 1875^{i c g}
- Melecta curvispina Lieftinck, 1958^{i c g}
- Melecta diacantha Eversmann, 1852^{i c g}
- Melecta diligens Lieftinck, 1983^{i c g}
- Melecta duodecimmaculata (Rossi, 1790)^{i c g}
- Melecta edwardsii Cresson, 1878^{i c g b} (Edward's melecta)
- Melecta emodi Baker, 1997^{i c g}
- Melecta excelsa Lieftinck, 1980^{i c g}
- Melecta festiva Lieftinck, 1980^{i c g}
- Melecta fulgida Lieftinck, 1980^{i c g}
- Melecta fumipennis Lieftinck, 1980^{i c g}
- Melecta funeraria Smith, 1854^{i c g}
- Melecta fuscipennis (Morawitz, 1875)^{i c g}
- Melecta gracilipes Lieftinck, 1980^{i c g}
- Melecta grandis Lepeletier, 1841^{i c g}
- Melecta guichardi Lieftinck, 1980^{i c g}
- Melecta guilochei Dusmet y Alonso, 1915^{i c g}
- Melecta honesta Lieftinck, 1980^{i c g}
- Melecta italica Radoszkowski, 1876^{i c g}
- Melecta kuschakewiczi (Radoszkowski, 1890)^{i c g}
- Melecta leucorhyncha Gribodo, 1893^{i c g}
- Melecta luctuosa (Scopoli, 1770)^{i c g}
- Melecta mundula Lieftinck, 1983^{i c g}
- Melecta nivosa Morawitz, 1893^{i c g}
- Melecta obscura Friese, 1895^{i c g}
- Melecta octomaculata Radoszkowski, 1876^{g}
- Melecta pacifica Cresson, 1878^{i c g b}
- Melecta prophanta Lieftinck, 1980^{i c g}
- Melecta rutenica Radoszkowski, 1893^{g}
- Melecta separata Cresson, 1879^{i c g b}
- Melecta sibirica Radoszkowski, 1891^{i c g}
- Melecta sinaitica (Alfken, 1937)^{i c g}
- Melecta solivaga Lieftinck, 1980^{i c g}
- Melecta thoracica Cresson, 1875^{i c g}
- Melecta transcaspica Morawitz, 1895^{i c g}
- Melecta tuberculata Lieftinck, 1980^{i c g}
- Melecta turkestanica Radoszkowski, 1893^{i c g}

Data sources: i = ITIS, c = Catalogue of Life, g = GBIF, b = Bugguide.net
