= List of Coelioxys species =

This is a list of species in genus Coelioxys, the leaf-cutting cuckoo bees or sharp-tailed bees.

As of December 2015, ITIS lists 500 species in this genus.

Note that many adjectives need correcting to fit the masculine for gender agreement. The genus ending -oxys is from Latinized Greek and is masculine, despite any earlier usage of feminine adjectives.

A B C D E F G H I J K L M N O P Q R S T U V U W X Y Z

== A ==
- Coelioxys abdominalis
- Coelioxys aberrans
- Coelioxys abnormis
- Coelioxys acanthopyga
- Coelioxys acanthura
- Coelioxys aculeata
- Coelioxys aculeaticeps
- Coelioxys acutivalva
- Coelioxys adani
- Coelioxys afer
- Coelioxys agilis
- Coelioxys alacris
- Coelioxys alatus
- Coelioxys alatiformis
- Coelioxys alayoi
- Coelioxys albifrons
- Coelioxys albiventris
- Coelioxys albociliatus
- Coelioxys albofasciatus
- Coelioxys albolineata
- Coelioxys albomarginatus
- Coelioxys albonotatus
- Coelioxys alfkeni
- Coelioxys alisal
- Coelioxys alternata
- Coelioxys amazonica
- Coelioxys ambrosettii
- Coelioxys analis
- Coelioxys angelicus
- Coelioxys angulatus
- Coelioxys angustivalva
- Coelioxys anisitsi
- Coelioxys annamensis
- Coelioxys apacheorum
- Coelioxys aperta
- Coelioxys apicatus
- Coelioxys argentea
- Coelioxys argentipes
- Coelioxys artemis
- Coelioxys asclepiadis
- Coelioxys aspaste
- Coelioxys ateneata
- Coelioxys aureociliata
- Coelioxys aurifrons
- Coelioxys auripes
- Coelioxys aurolimbata
- Coelioxys aurulenta
- Coelioxys australis
- Coelioxys azteca

== B ==
- Coelioxys bakeri
- Coelioxys balasto
- Coelioxys banksi
- Coelioxys barbata
- Coelioxys barkeri
- Coelioxys bequaertiana
- Coelioxys beroni
- Coelioxys bertonii
- Coelioxys bicingulata
- Coelioxys bifida
- Coelioxys bifoliata
- Coelioxys bifoveolata
- Coelioxys binghami
- Coelioxys bipustulata
- Coelioxys biroi
- Coelioxys bisoncornua
- Coelioxys blabera
- Coelioxys boharti
- Coelioxys bonaerensis
- Coelioxys bonplandiana
- Coelioxys brachypyga
- Coelioxys brasiliensis
- Coelioxys braunsiana
- Coelioxys brevicaudata
- Coelioxys brevis
- Coelioxys breviventris
- Coelioxys bruchi
- Coelioxys bruneipes
- Coelioxys bruneri
- Coelioxys bucephala
- Coelioxys buchwaldi
- Coelioxys buehleri
- Coelioxys bulbosa
- Coelioxys bullaticeps
- Coelioxys burgdorfi

== C ==
- Coelioxys caeruleipennis
- Coelioxys caffra
- Coelioxys calabarensis
- Coelioxys cameghinoi
- Coelioxys capensis
- Coelioxys capitatus
- Coelioxys carinicauda
- Coelioxys carinulata
- Coelioxys castanea
- Coelioxys caudata
- Coelioxys cavigena
- Coelioxys cayennensis
- Coelioxys cearensis
- Coelioxys cerasiopleura
- Coelioxys chacoensis
- Coelioxys cherenensis
- Coelioxys chichimeca
- Coelioxys chilensis
- Coelioxys chionospila
- Coelioxys chola
- Coelioxys circumscripta
- Coelioxys circumscriptus
- Coelioxys cisnerosi
- Coelioxys clypearis
- Coelioxys clypeata
- Coelioxys cochleariformis
- Coelioxys coeruleipennis
- Coelioxys coloboptyche
- Coelioxys coloratula
- Coelioxys columbica
- Coelioxys concavogenalis
- Coelioxys concolor
- Coelioxys confusus
- Coelioxys congoensis
- Coelioxys conoidea
- Coelioxys conspersa
- Coelioxys cordillerana
- Coelioxys corduvensis
- Coelioxys coriacea
- Coelioxys correntina
- Coelioxys costaricensis
- Coelioxys cothura
- Coelioxys coturnix
- Coelioxys crassiceps
- Coelioxys crassiventris
- Coelioxys cuneata
- Coelioxys cyanura

== D ==
- Coelioxys dapitanensis
- Coelioxys darwiniensis
- Coelioxys deani
- Coelioxys decipiens
- Coelioxys deletangi
- Coelioxys demeter
- Coelioxys dentigera
- Coelioxys desmieri
- Coelioxys difformis
- Coelioxys digitata
- Coelioxys dinellii
- Coelioxys dispersa
- Coelioxys diversidentata
- Coelioxys dobzhanskyi
- Coelioxys doelloi
- Coelioxys doeringi
- Coelioxys dolichos
- Coelioxys domestica
- Coelioxys ducalis
- Coelioxys duckei

== E ==
- Coelioxys echinata
- Coelioxys edentata
- Coelioxys edita
- Coelioxys eduardi
- Coelioxys elata
- Coelioxys elegantula
- Coelioxys elizabeth
- Coelioxys elongatus
- Coelioxys elongativentris
- Coelioxys elsei
- Coelioxys emarginata
- Coelioxys emarginatella
- Coelioxys epaenete
- Coelioxys epistene
- Coelioxys erysimi
- Coelioxys erythrura
- Coelioxys excisa
- Coelioxys eximia
- Coelioxys exspectata

== F ==
- Coelioxys farinosa
- Coelioxys fenestratus
- Coelioxys fimbriata
- Coelioxys florea
- Coelioxys floridana
- Coelioxys foersteri
- Coelioxys fontanae
- Coelioxys formosicola
- Coelioxys fossulata
- Coelioxys foveolata
- Coelioxys foxii
- Coelioxys frieseana
- Coelioxys frigens
- Coelioxys froggatti
- Coelioxys fulviceps
- Coelioxys fulvifrons
- Coelioxys funeraria
- Coelioxys fuscipennis

== G ==
- Coelioxys galactiae
- Coelioxys gallardoi
- Coelioxys genalis
- Coelioxys genalis
- Coelioxys genisei
- Coelioxys genoconcavitus
- Coelioxys germana
- Coelioxys giacomellii
- Coelioxys gigantea
- Coelioxys gilensis
- Coelioxys gonaspis
- Coelioxys gracillima
- Coelioxys grindeliae
- Coelioxys guaranitica
- Coelioxys guptai

== H ==
- Coelioxys haematura
- Coelioxys haemorrhoa
- Coelioxys heterozona
- Coelioxys hickeni
- Coelioxys hiroba
- Coelioxys hirsutissima
- Coelioxys hirtiventris
- Coelioxys holmbergi
- Coelioxys hosoba
- Coelioxys huarpum
- Coelioxys hubrichiana
- Coelioxys humahuakae
- Coelioxys hunteri
- Coelioxys hyalinipennis

== I ==
- Coelioxys ignava
- Coelioxys immaculata
- Coelioxys incarinata
- Coelioxys inconspicua
- Coelioxys indica
- Coelioxys inermis
- Coelioxys insita
- Coelioxys insolita
- Coelioxys intacta
- Coelioxys integra
- Coelioxys intermedia
- Coelioxys iranica
- Coelioxys issororensis

== J ==
- Coelioxys joergenseni
- Coelioxys joergenseniana
- Coelioxys jujuyensis
- Coelioxys junodi

== K ==
- Coelioxys kasachstana
- Coelioxys katangensis
- Coelioxys khasiana
- Coelioxys kosemponis
- Coelioxys kualana
- Coelioxys kuscheli

== L ==
- Coelioxys labiosa
- Coelioxys laevicollis
- Coelioxys laevigata
- Coelioxys laevis
- Coelioxys lanceolata
- Coelioxys langi
- Coelioxys lata
- Coelioxys latefasciata
- Coelioxys laticauda
- Coelioxys laticeps
- Coelioxys lativalva
- Coelioxys lativentris
- Coelioxys lativentroides
- Coelioxys laudabilis
- Coelioxys leopoldensis
- Coelioxys leopoldinae
- Coelioxys leptura
- Coelioxys leucochrysea
- Coelioxys liberalis
- Coelioxys ljuba
- Coelioxys longispina
- Coelioxys longiventris
- Coelioxys loricula
- Coelioxys luangwana
- Coelioxys lucidicauda
- Coelioxys luzonica
- Coelioxys lyprura

== M ==
- Coelioxys macaria
- Coelioxys maculata
- Coelioxys maculoides
- Coelioxys madagascariensis
- Coelioxys magretti
- Coelioxys manchurica
- Coelioxys mandibularis
- Coelioxys manilae
- Coelioxys mapuche
- Coelioxys marchalli
- Coelioxys marginata
- Coelioxys melanopus
- Coelioxys mendozina
- Coelioxys menthae
- Coelioxys mesae
- Coelioxys mesopotamica
- Coelioxys mexicana
- Coelioxys mielbergi
- Coelioxys mimetica
- Coelioxys miranda
- Coelioxys missionum
- Coelioxys mitchelli
- Coelioxys modesta
- Coelioxys moesta
- Coelioxys mongolica
- Coelioxys mutans

== N ==
- Coelioxys nasuta
- Coelioxys natalensis
- Coelioxys neavei
- Coelioxys neli
- Coelioxys nigripes
- Coelioxys nigrofimbriata
- Coelioxys nigrura
- Coelioxys nitidicauda
- Coelioxys nitidicollis
- Coelioxys nitidoscutellaris
- Coelioxys nivosa
- Coelioxys noa
- Coelioxys nodis
- Coelioxys novomexicana

== O ==
- Coelioxys oaxacana
- Coelioxys obtusa
- Coelioxys obtusata
- Coelioxys obtusispina
- Coelioxys obtusivalva
- Coelioxys obtusiventris
- Coelioxys occidentalis
- Coelioxys octodentata
- Coelioxys octodenticulata
- Coelioxys odin
- Coelioxys opacicollis
- Coelioxys oriplanes
- Coelioxys osmiae
- Coelioxys otomita

== P ==
- Coelioxys pachyceps
- Coelioxys pachyrhina
- Coelioxys palmaris
- Coelioxys paludicola
- Coelioxys pampeana
- Coelioxys paradoxa
- Coelioxys paraguaya
- Coelioxys paraguayensis
- Coelioxys patagonica
- Coelioxys patiens
- Coelioxys patula
- Coelioxys pauloensis
- Coelioxys pedregalensis
- Coelioxys penetatrix
- Coelioxys peregrinata
- Coelioxys pergandei
- Coelioxys perseus
- Coelioxys philippensis
- Coelioxys picicornis
- Coelioxys pieliana
- Coelioxys piercei
- Coelioxys piliclypeus
- Coelioxys piligena
- Coelioxys pilivalva
- Coelioxys planidens
- Coelioxys polycentris
- Coelioxys pomona
- Coelioxys popovi
- Coelioxys porterae
- Coelioxys postponenda
- Coelioxys praetextata
- Coelioxys pratti
- Coelioxys producta
- Coelioxys proxima
- Coelioxys pruinosa
- Coelioxys pruna
- Coelioxys pucaraensis
- Coelioxys pulchella
- Coelioxys puncticollis
- Coelioxys pygidialis

== Q ==
- Coelioxys quadriceps
- Coelioxys quadridentata
- Coelioxys quadrifasciata
- Coelioxys quaerens
- Coelioxys quartodecimdentata
- Coelioxys quattuordecimpunctata
- Coelioxys quechua

== R ==
- Coelioxys radoszkowskyi
- Coelioxys raffrayi
- Coelioxys ramakrishnae
- Coelioxys recusata
- Coelioxys reediana
- Coelioxys reginae
- Coelioxys remissa
- Coelioxys reticulata
- Coelioxys rhadia
- Coelioxys rhinosa
- Coelioxys riojana
- Coelioxys robusta
- Coelioxys roigi
- Coelioxys rosarina
- Coelioxys rostrata
- Coelioxys rotundiscutum
- Coelioxys rubella
- Coelioxys rufa
- Coelioxys rufescens
- Coelioxys ruficincta
- Coelioxys ruficollis
- Coelioxys rufipes
- Coelioxys rufispina
- Coelioxys rufitarsis
- Coelioxys rufocincta
- Coelioxys rufopicta
- Coelioxys rugicollis
- Coelioxys rugulosa
- Coelioxys ruizi
- Coelioxys ruzi

== S ==
- Coelioxys sakamotorum
- Coelioxys salinaria
- Coelioxys saltensis
- Coelioxys sanguineus
- Coelioxys sanguinicollis
- Coelioxys sanguinosus
- Coelioxys sanjuaninus
- Coelioxys sannicolarensis
- Coelioxys sayi
- Coelioxys schmidti
- Coelioxys schulzi
- Coelioxys scioensis
- Coelioxys scitula
- Coelioxys scutellaris
- Coelioxys scutellotuberculatus
- Coelioxys semenowi
- Coelioxys semicarinatus
- Coelioxys seminitidus
- Coelioxys serricaudatus
- Coelioxys setosus
- Coelioxys sexmaculatus
- Coelioxys siamensis
- Coelioxys simillimus
- Coelioxys slossoni
- Coelioxys smithii
- Coelioxys sodalis
- Coelioxys sogdianus
- Coelioxys soledadensis
- Coelioxys somalicus
- Coelioxys somalinus
- Coelioxys spativentris
- Coelioxys spatulatus
- Coelioxys speculifera
- Coelioxys spilaspis
- Coelioxys spinipyga
- Coelioxys spinosus
- Coelioxys spissicauda
- Coelioxys squamatulus
- Coelioxys squamigera
- Coelioxys squamosus
- Coelioxys squamosissimus
- Coelioxys squamosoides
- Coelioxys squamosulus
- Coelioxys strigatus
- Coelioxys subdentatus
- Coelioxys subelongatus
- Coelioxys subhamatus
- Coelioxys subnitens
- Coelioxys subspinosus
- Coelioxys subtropicalis
- Coelioxys sudanensis
- Coelioxys surinamensis

== T ==
- Coelioxys tabayensis
- Coelioxys tardus
- Coelioxys tastil
- Coelioxys tegularis
- Coelioxys tehuelche
- Coelioxys tenacior
- Coelioxys tenax
- Coelioxys tenebrosus
- Coelioxys tenebrosoides
- Coelioxys tepaneca
- Coelioxys texanus
- Coelioxys tiburonensis
- Coelioxys tilcarae
- Coelioxys togoensis
- Coelioxys tolteca
- Coelioxys toltecoides
- Coelioxys torquatus
- Coelioxys torridus
- Coelioxys torridulus
- Coelioxys totonaca
- Coelioxys trancas
- Coelioxys triangula
- Coelioxys tricarinatus
- Coelioxys tridentatus
- Coelioxys triodonta
- Coelioxys trispinosus
- Coelioxys truncaticauda
- Coelioxys tucumana
- Coelioxys turbinatus

== U ==
- Coelioxys ultima
- Coelioxys umbripennis
- Coelioxys unicula
- Coelioxys unidentatus

== V ==
- Coelioxys variegatus
- Coelioxys verticalis
- Coelioxys victoriae
- Coelioxys vigilans
- Coelioxys vituperabilis

== W ==
- Coelioxys wagenknechti
- Coelioxys warnckei
- Coelioxys weinlandi
- Coelioxys weyrauchi
- Coelioxys wilmattae

== X ==
- Coelioxys xinjiangensis

== Y ==
- Coelioxys yanonis
- Coelioxys yunnanensis

== Z ==
- Coelioxys zapoteca
- Coelioxys zonula
