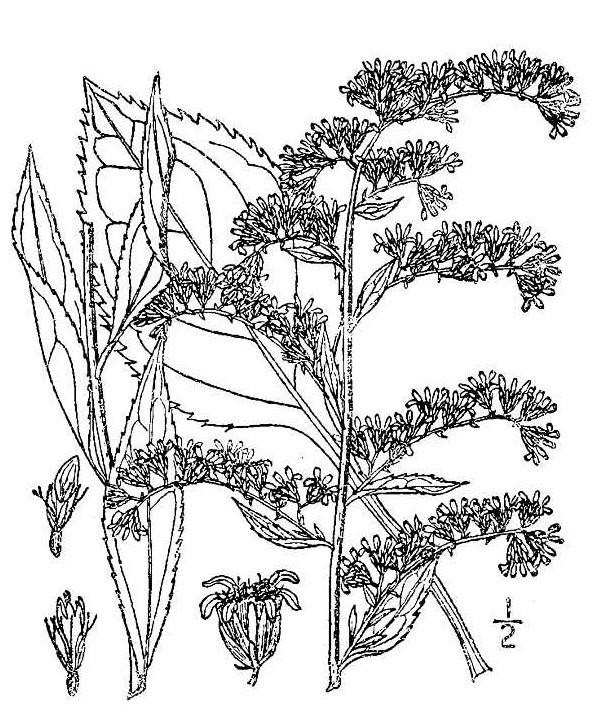
- 1913 illustration

Scientific classification
- Kingdom: Plantae
- Clade: Embryophytes
- Clade: Tracheophytes
- Clade: Spermatophytes
- Clade: Angiosperms
- Clade: Eudicots
- Clade: Asterids
- Order: Asterales
- Family: Asteraceae
- Genus: Solidago
- Species: S. arguta

Binomial name
- Solidago arguta Aiton

Synonyms
- Aster arguta (Aiton) Kuntze; Solidago boottii Hook.; Solidago dispersa Small; Solidago harrisii E.S.Steele; Solidago neurolepis Fernald; Solidago vaseyi A.Heller; Solidago yadkinensis (Porter) Small

= Solidago arguta =

Species of flowering plant

Solidago arguta, commonly called Atlantic goldenrod, cut-leaf goldenrod, and sharp-leaved goldenrod, is a species of flowering plant native to eastern and central North America. It grows along the Gulf and Atlantic states of the United States from Texas to Maine, inland as far as Ontario, Illinois, and Kansas. It is primarily found in areas of woodland openings, such as outcrops or clearings.

== Description ==
Solidago arguta is a tall fall-flowering perennial. Flowers are small, yellow, and in heads. It can be distinguished from similar goldenrods by its broad basal leaves that are lightly pubescent to hairless, which decrease in size towards the apex of the stem.

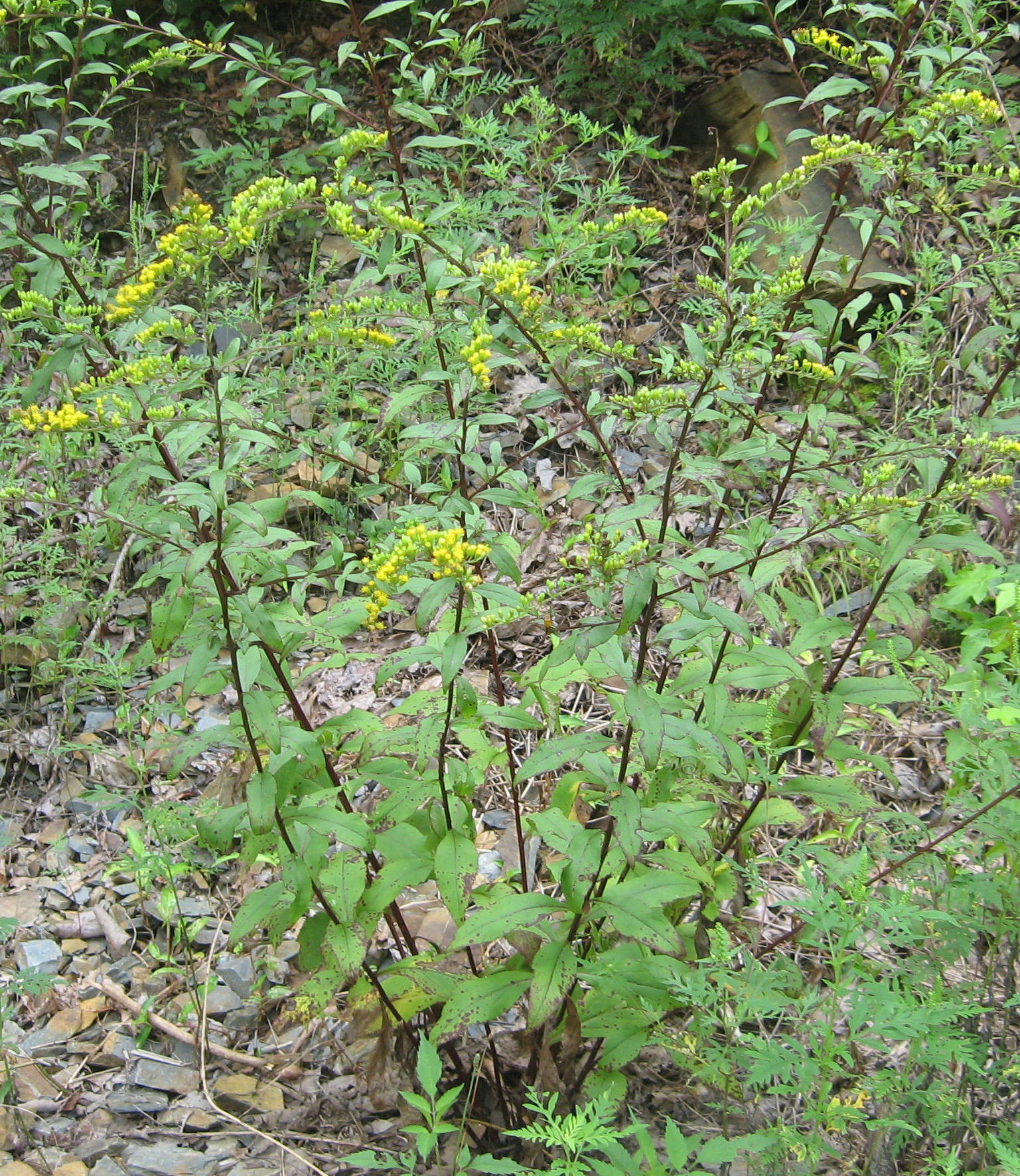
Typical growing habit

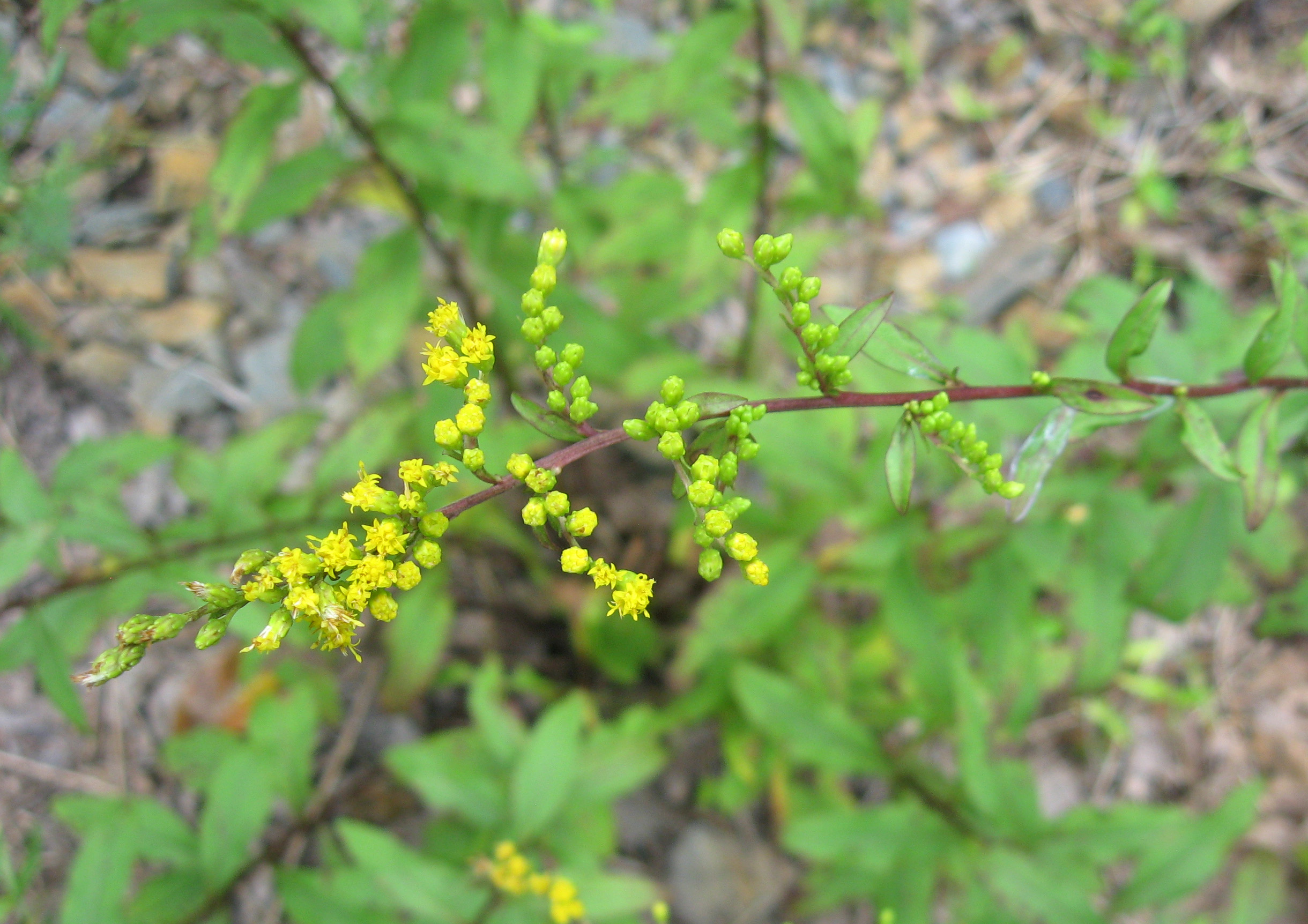
Detail of flowers

=== Galls ===
This species is host to the following insect induced gall:

- Asteromyia carbonifera (Osten Sacken, 1862)

external link to gallformers

== Taxonomy ==
Four varieties are recognized by most authors. They are:

- Solidago arguta var. arguta - With hairless achenes; native to the Appalachian Mountains and the Northeast
- Solidago arguta var. boottii (Hook.) E.J.Palmer & Steyerm. - With pubescent achenes and leaves; native to the Ozark Mountains and the Gulf Coastal Plain
- Solidago arguta var. caroliniana (Gray) G.H.Morton - With pubescent achenes and hairless leaves; native across the Southeastern United States
- Solidago arguta var. harrisii Cronquist - With thick-textured, truncate basal leaves; native to the Central Appalachians

Due to its morphological distinctiveness and narrow geographic range, some modern taxonomists treat variety harrisii as a full species (named Solidago harrisii).

== Ecology ==
Solidago arguta is insect pollinated and is recorded to have been visited in northern Florida by Augochloropsis metallica, Bombus impatiens, Coelioxys sayi, Lasioglossum apopkense, Megachile xylocopoides, Megachile albitarsis, Megachile mendica, Melissodes bimaculatus, Nomia nortoni,and Perdita bishoppi.
