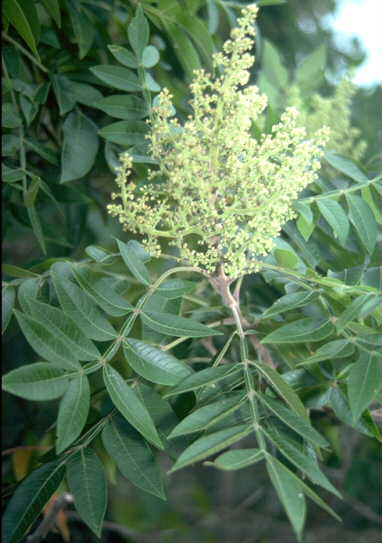

Conservation status
- Least Concern (IUCN 3.1)

- Secure (NatureServe)

Scientific classification
- Kingdom: Plantae
- Clade: Tracheophytes
- Clade: Angiosperms
- Clade: Eudicots
- Clade: Rosids
- Order: Sapindales
- Family: Anacardiaceae
- Genus: Rhus
- Species: R. copallinum

Binomial name
- Rhus copallinum L.

Varieties
- R. c. var. copallinum R. c. var. latifolia Engl. R. c. var. leucantha (Jacq.) DC.
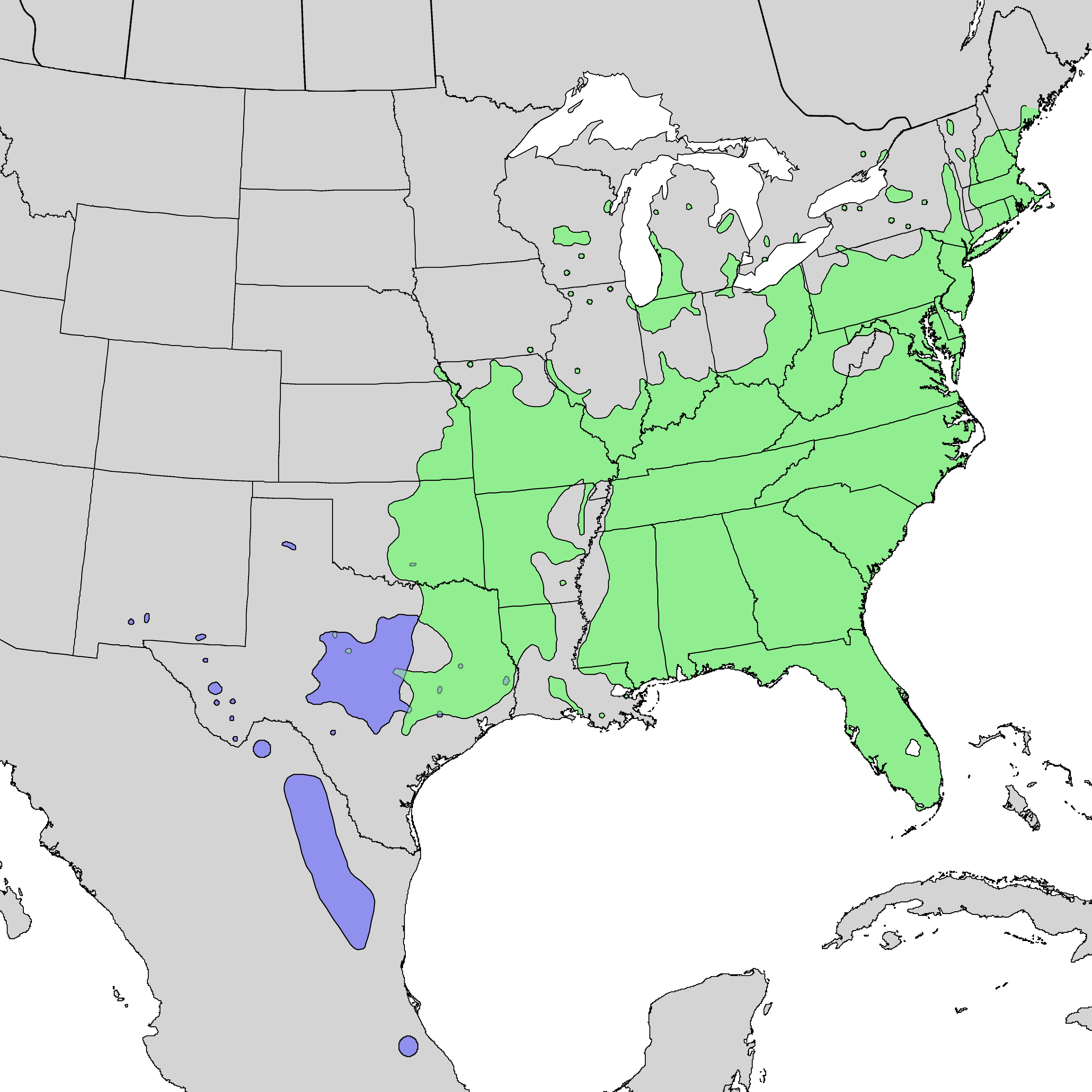
- Native range of Rhus copallinum var. copallinum (green) & var. latifolia (blue)

Synonyms
- Rhus copallina

= Rhus copallinum =

Species of tree

Rhus copallinum, the winged sumac, shining sumac, dwarf sumac or flameleaf sumac, is a species of flowering plant in the cashew family (Anacardiaceae) that is native to eastern North America. It is a deciduous tree growing to 3.5–5.5 metres (11–18 ft) tall and an equal spread with a rounded crown. A 5-year-old sapling will stand about 2.5 metres (8.2 ft). The name Rhus copallina is also used, but this is not consistent with the rules of the International Association for Plant Taxonomy.

== Description ==
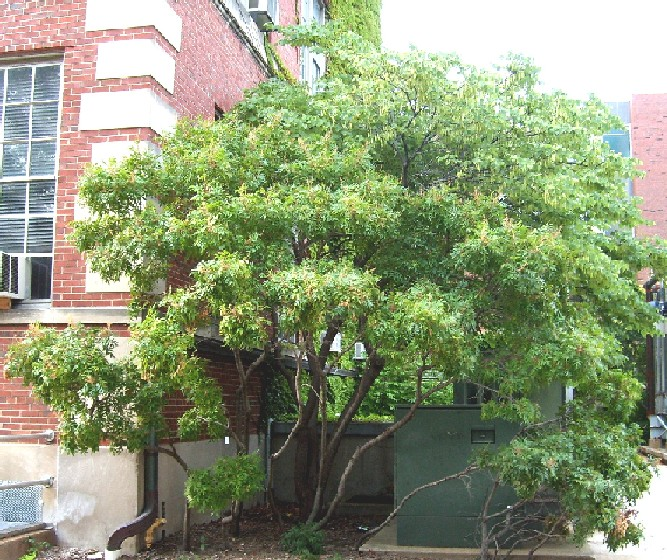
Shining sumac at Illinois State University

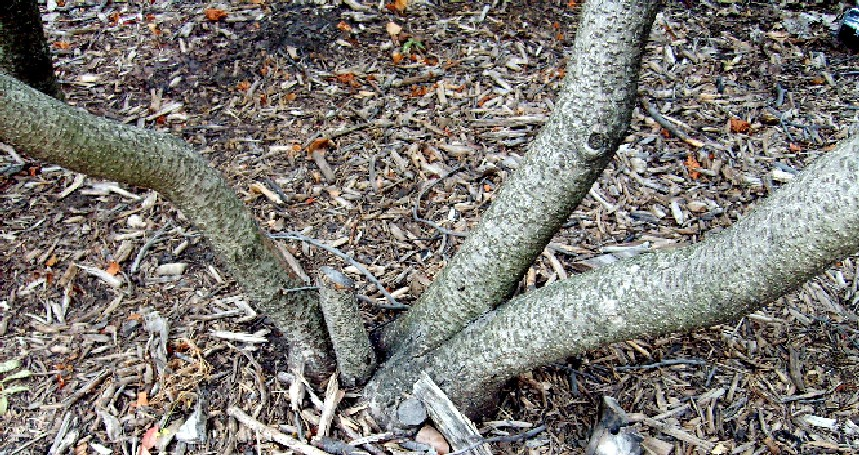
Trunk of a shining sumac

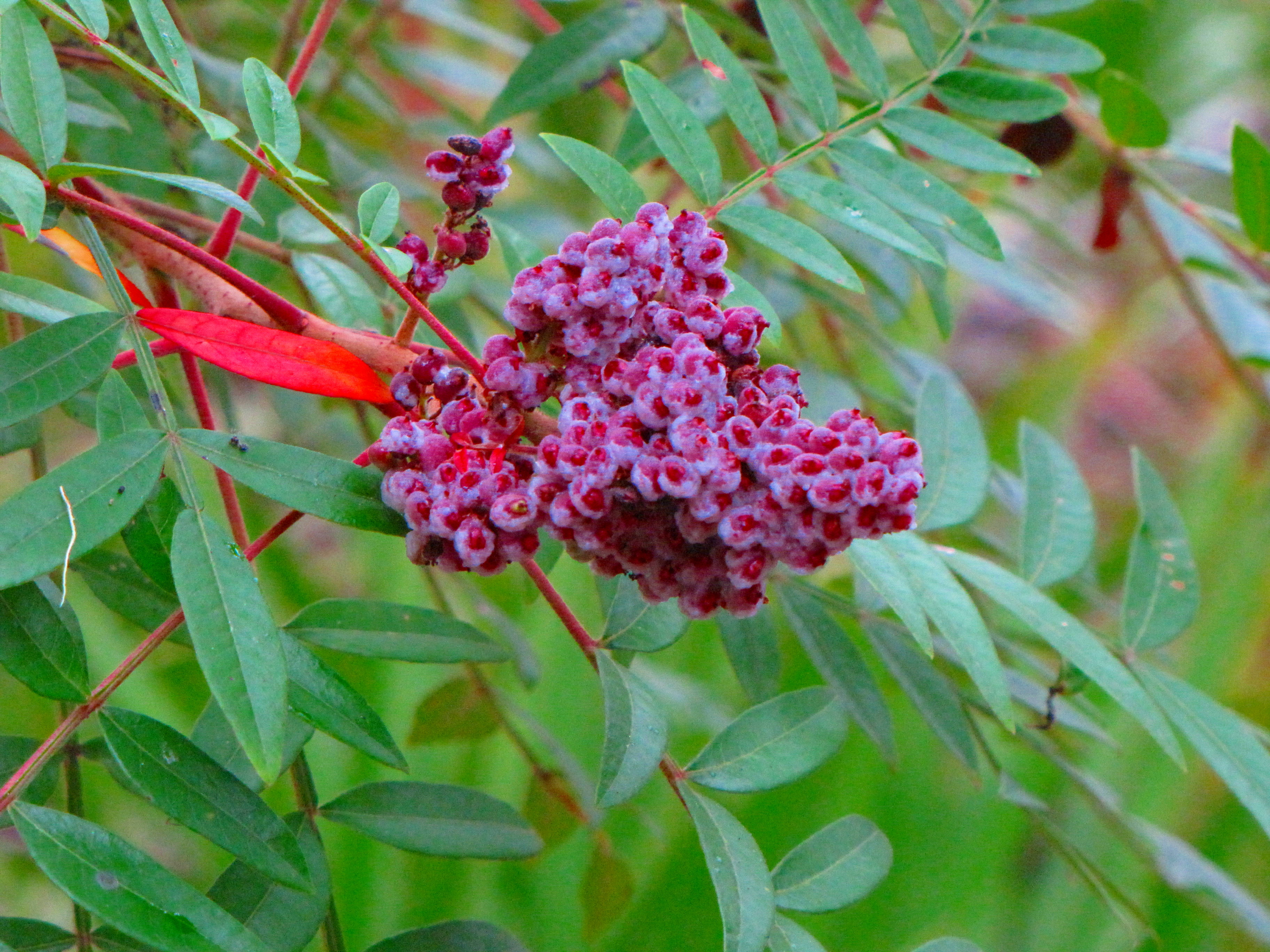
Shining sumac berries

Shining sumac is often cultivated, where it is well-suited to natural and informal landscapes because it has underground runners which spread to provide dense, shrubby cover for birds and wildlife. This species is valued for ornamental planting because of its lustrous dark green foliage which turns a brilliant orange-red in fall. The fall color display is frequently enjoyed along interstate highways, as the plant readily colonizes these and other disturbed sites. The tiny, greenish-yellow flowers, borne in compact, terminal panicles, are followed by showy red clusters of berries which persist into the winter and attract wildlife.

Winged Sumac Under The Microscope

The flowers are yellow, flowering in the summer. The fruit attracts birds with no significant litter problem, is persistent on the tree, and is showy.

The bark is thin and easily damaged from mechanical impact; branches droop as the tree grows, and will require pruning for vehicular or pedestrian clearance beneath the canopy; routinely grown with, or trainable to be grown with, multiple trunks. The tree wants to grow with several trunks, but can be trained to grow with a single trunk. It has no thorns.

Its leaves are alternate and pinnately compound. The leaflets are borne on alate rachis that give the plant one of its common names: "winged sumac".

Microscopic Observation of Winged Sumac( Rhus copallinum) Leaf Epidermis

The two images above show a microscopic view of the Winged Sumac ( Rhus copallinum). The epidermis is the outermost protective layer of the leaf and plays an important role in preventing water loss in the plant from environmental conditions. The epidermis is also used for gas exchange it uses a specialized structure called the stomata.

This image of the plant termed the Winged Sumac (Rhus copallinum) shows a distanced photo of the full plant and its structure. The color of the leaves give off a red, brownish, and orange color. This reflection of those colors specifically means that it has pigments inside the chloroplast called anthocyanins. Anthocyanins absorb mostly green and blue green, reflecting off beautiful hues of red, orange and brown coloring. This does not mean though that this plant does not have other pigments. During the fall, which was when this photo was taken, the anthocyanin pigments are dominant, while chlorophylls a and b break down and carotenoids start degrading as well. During the summer the leaves turn green, showing abundance in chlorophylls a and b, the carotenoids are still present but masked by the chlorophyll pigments, and the anthocyanins are fairly low in quantity. This implies the change of leaves during the seasons also changes the pigments in the chloroplast.

== Taxonomy ==
Rhus copallinum belongs to the Anacardiaceae family. This species was named by Carl Linnaeus in Species Plantarum. There are multiple recognized subspecies of Rhus copallium including Rhus copallinum L. var. copallinum, Rhus copallinum L. var. latifolia Engl., Rhus copallinum var. lanceolata Gray and Rhus copallinum L. var. leucantha (Jacq.) DC. The lecotype is located in the British Museum.

== Distribution and habitat ==
Rhus copallinum extends from the Coastal Plain of Florida to Ontario, Canada. Rhus copallinum extends as far west as Texas, Nebraska, Oklahoma, and Kansas. (The R. copallinum var. lanceolata is also found in parts of Mexico.) This species is found in many different ecosystems such as Longleaf-slash pine, Loblolly- shortleaf pine, Oak-pine, Oak-hickory, and Oak-gum-cypress. R. copallinum is found in many plant associations, but does not indicate the presence of a specific habitat. This species grows best in full sunlight and well-drained soils, but is resistant to the effects of pollution, drought, heavy pruning, compacted soil, and transplanting. Additionally, once established, it is difficult to remove from an area. It is also known to be in competition with young pines and other hardwoods in multiple habitats.

== Cultivation and uses ==
The tree can be planted in a container or above-ground planter. It has been recommended for buffer strips around parking lots or for median strip plantings in the highway, as well as for land reclamation. Rhus copallinum can tolerate exposure to salt spray in maritime forests and coastal grasslands; it can grow in serpentine soil and shallow, rocky soil. Rhus copallinum tolerates soil pH ranging from 5.3 to 7.5, requires between 28 and 60 millimeters of water, and can survive a minimum temperature of -28 °F. There are male and female Rhus copallium shrubs: both are needed for reproduction.

The tree grows in full sun or part shade. Soil tolerances include clay, loam, sand, slightly alkaline, acidic, and well-drained soil. Its drought tolerance is high.

The somewhat sour berrylike fruits are edible and rich in vitamin A. They are eaten by wildlife and can be made into a lemonade-like drink. Additionally, deer browse the twigs of the species. The leaves make up part of the diets of captive Coquerel's sifakas (lemurs).

Rhus copallinum also has many medicinal uses. The bark can be used to treat diarrhea and menorrhagia and also has a strong effect on the female hormonal system. It was often used to help with the symptoms of menopause. Additionally, tea made from the fruit and bark can be used externally to treat oozing sores, burns, and blisters. The berry tea is prepared by steeping 1 teaspoon of dried fruit with every 8 ounces of water used for 30 minutes. The bark tea uses a half teaspoon for every 8 ounces of water, requires a decoct of 15 minutes, and is then steeped for 1 hour.

== Fruit ==
The fruit of Rhus copallinum was found to contain twelve compounds including a new galloyl derivative. The fruit are not good sources of protein, fat, or calcium, but contain large amounts of tannins. Fruits were used by Native Americans to treat mouth sores and dysentery. Native Americans also added it to drinking water for the lemony taste. It was also made into a tea that was used to treat urinary tract infections, gingivitis, ulcerated mucous membranes, thrush, and apthous stomatata. Rhus copallinum fruits ripen between the autumn months of August and October and last through winter.

== Fire and germination ==
Rhus copallinum is adapted to fire and seed germination increases with the heat from fire. Optimal germination of Rhus copallinum occurs at 90 °C. Fire eliminates the aboveground parts of R. copallinum allowing the root canals to be stimulated to increase stem production. The presence of burning also affects the leaf symmetry of Rhus copallinum. The seeds have also been known to germinate at high rates (75%) when soaked in sulfuric acid at room temperature.

== Ecology ==
Rhus copallinum is insect pollinated and is recorded to have been visited in northern Florida by Augochloropsis anonyma, Augochloropsis metallica, Colletes nudus, Lasioglossum apopkense, Lasioglossum imitatum, Lasioglossum reticulatum. Lasioglossum weemsi/leviense, Megachile xylocopoides, and Nomia nortoni.

== Conservation status ==
The conservation status of Rhus copallinum is secure in New York, Pennsylvania, West Virginia, Delaware, Virginia, and North Carolina. It is apparently secure in Ontario, Canada. There is no status rank available for the rest of the eastern seaboard and it is presumed to be possibly extirpated in Iowa.
