= Coelioxys polycentris =

Scientific classification
- Kingdom: Animalia
- Phylum: Arthropoda
- Clade: Pancrustacea
- Class: Insecta
- Order: Hymenoptera
- Family: Megachilidae
- Genus: Coelioxys
- Species: C. polycentris

Binomial name
- Coelioxys polycentris Förster, 1853

Synonyms
- Coelioxys conspersus Morawitz, 1874; Coelioxita polycentris (Förster, 1853); Coelioxys orientalis Friese, 1925; Coelioxys conspersa Morawitz, 1874

Species of bee

Coelioxys polycentris is a species of leaf-cutting cuckoo bee native to Europe and the Near East.

== Range ==
From Portugal via southern central and northern southern Europe, southern Russia to Buryatia (evidence from western Siberia is missing); northwards to northern Poland and northern Ukraine; south to Croatia, Serbia, Cyprus, Iran and Pakistan. Reported in Germany in 1921 and 1937 from the area around Mittenwalde in Brandenburg by Hedicke (1922) and Markowsky (1940); However, mating animals cannot be found. In Austria only two reports from Lake Neusiedl from Weiden by Warncke (1992) and from Illmitz by Zettel et al. 2004.

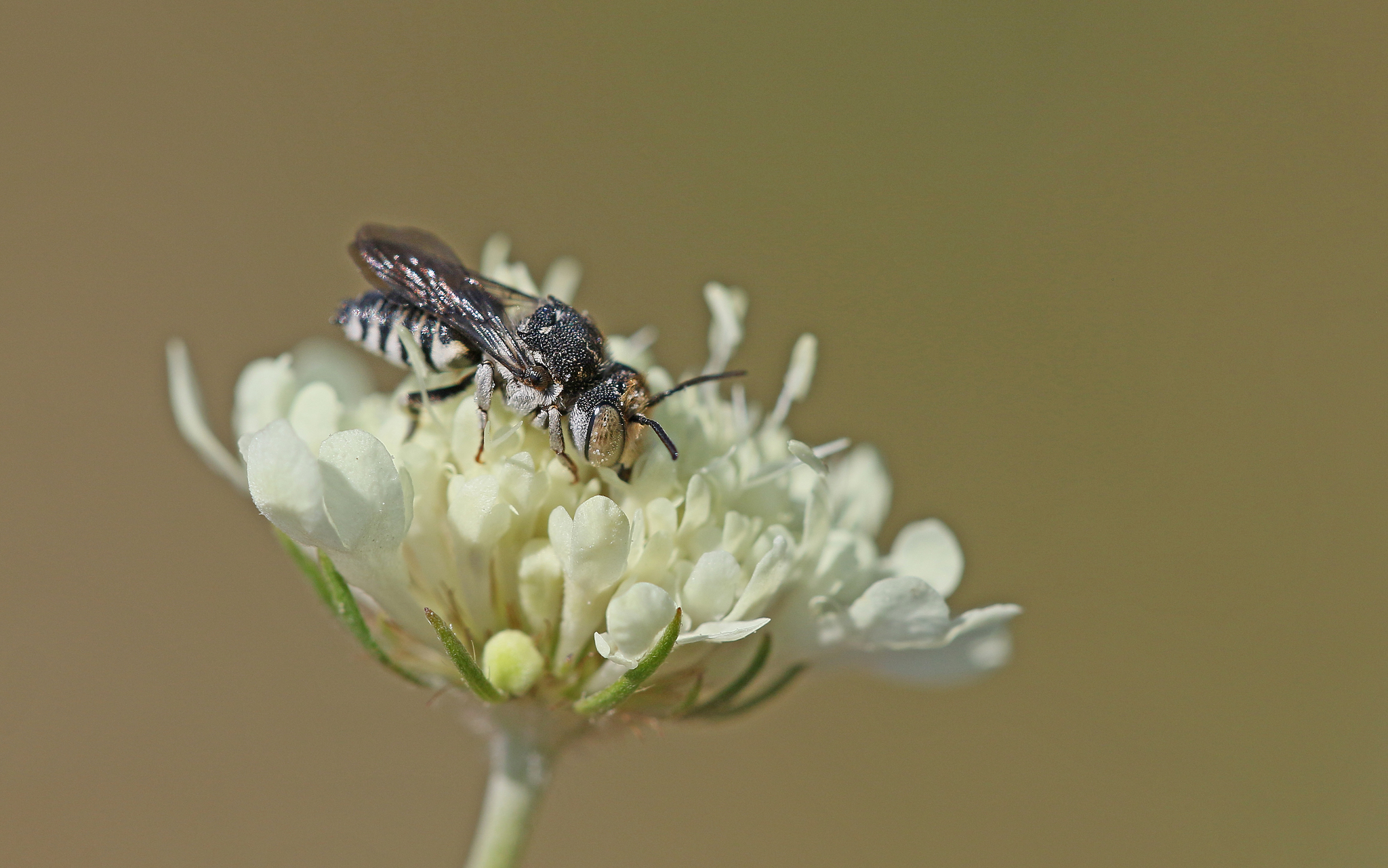
Coelioxys polycentris, Neusiedl am See, Burgenland, Austria, June 2021

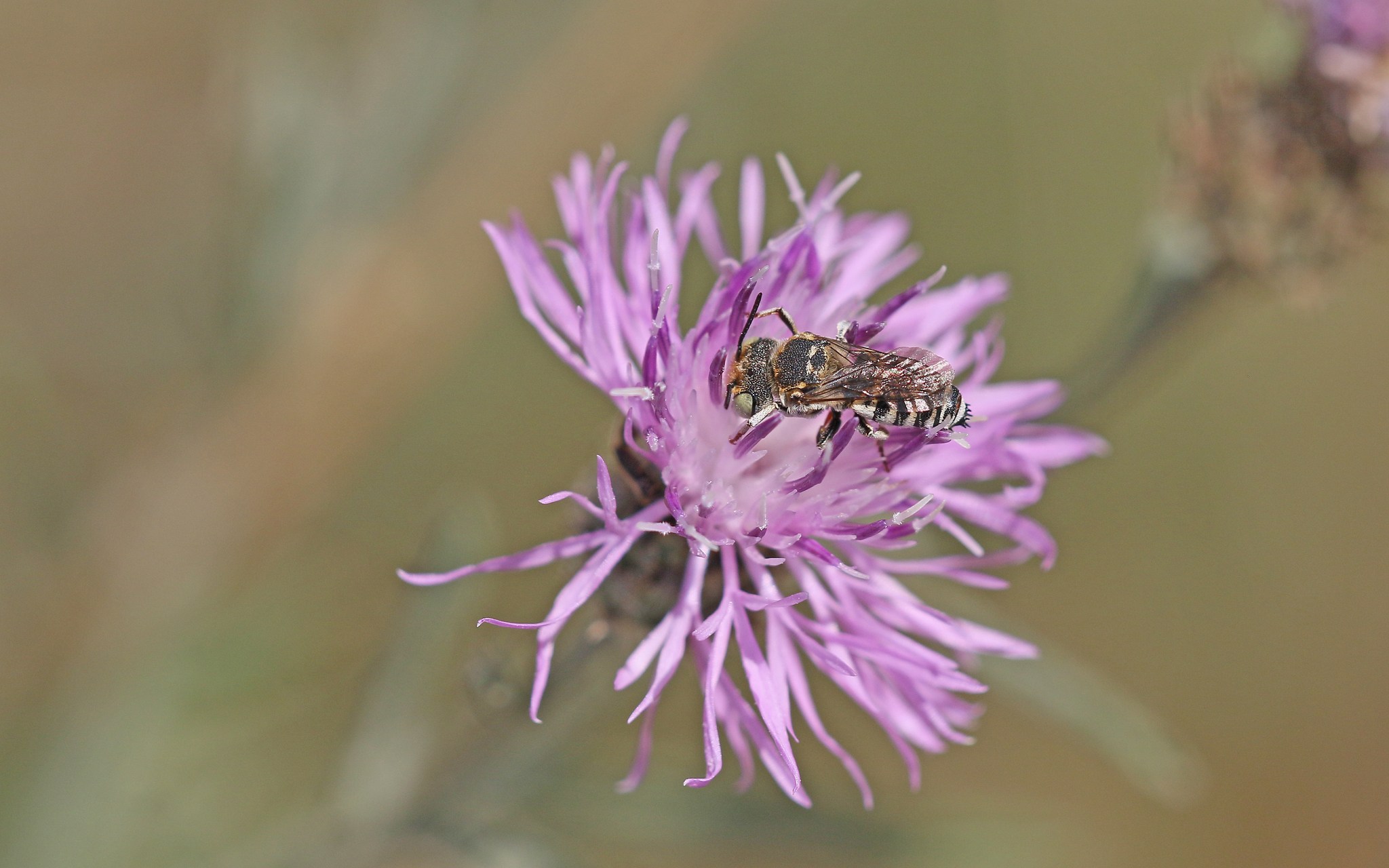
Coelioxys polycentris, Neusiedl am See, Burgenland, Austria, June 2021

This species has been reported from Brandenburg., where it is said to have been detected several times near Mittenwalde in 1921 and 1937. However, mating animals could not be found. The fact that the males were mistaken for Coelioxys brevis several times also underlines evidence that the species does not occur there. An earlier, but now extinct, marginal occurrence would be conceivable in the event that the earlier reports from Poland are based on correct determinations

== Ecology ==
Flight period in probably one generation stretches from June to August.

Megachile deceptoria is known as the host. According to an old observation from Turkey, Tetraloniella nana is also said to be a host species, but this information needs to be checked.

== Taxonomy ==
subgenus Allocoelioxys TKALCU, 1974
