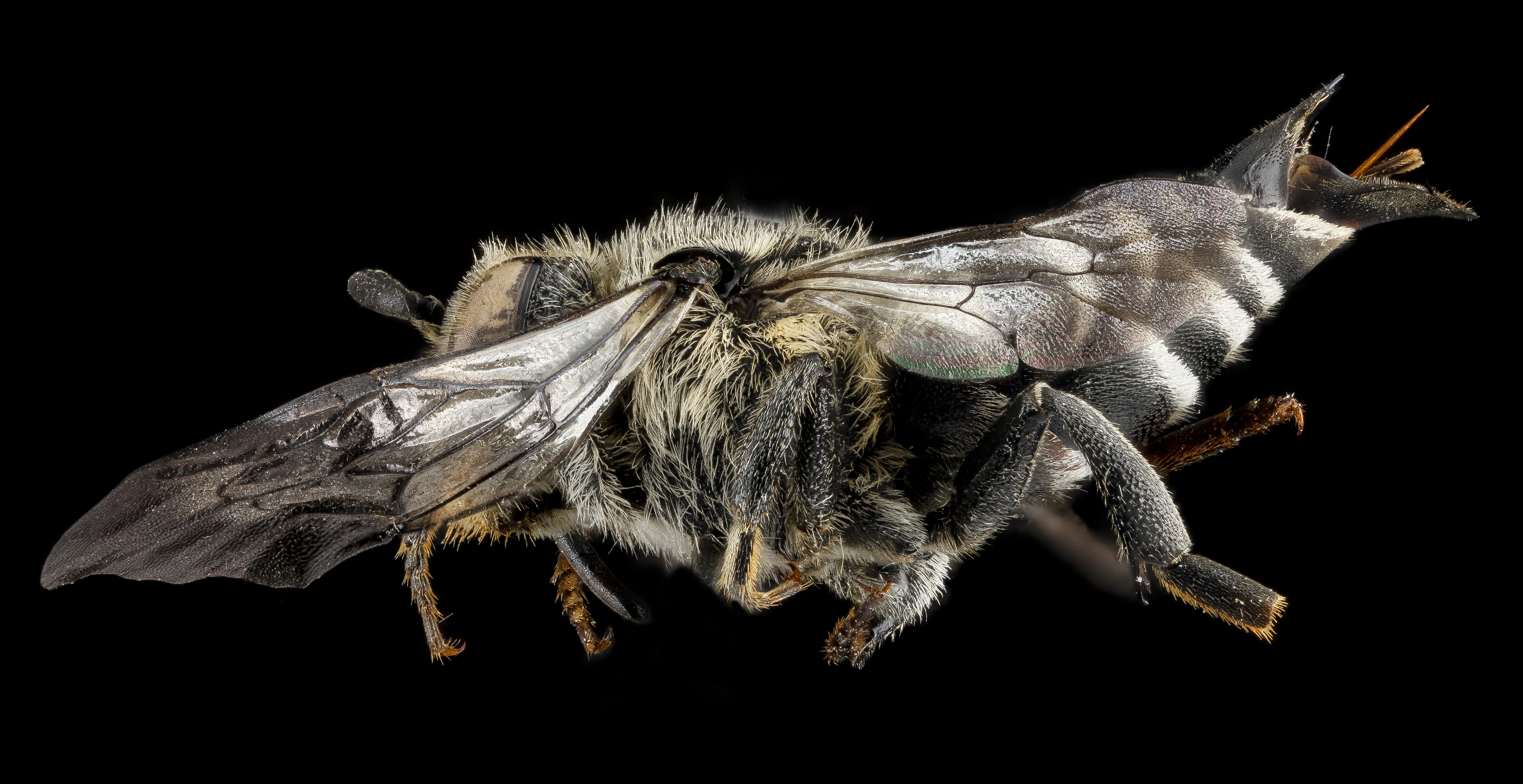
- Female

Scientific classification
- Kingdom: Animalia
- Phylum: Arthropoda
- Class: Insecta
- Order: Hymenoptera
- Family: Megachilidae
- Genus: Coelioxys
- Species: C. sodalis

Binomial name
- Coelioxys sodalis Cresson, 1878

= Coelioxys sodalis =

Species of bee

Coelioxys sodalis is a bee from the family Megachilidae, one of numerous kleptoparasitic bees in the tribe Megachilini. Members of the genus Coelioxys exhibit kleptoparasitic behavior in that they lay their eggs in the nests of other bees, typically those of the related genus Megachile. As this behavior is similar to that of cuckoos, such bees are referred to as cuckoo bees. These host-parasite relationships are complex. Host insects of the brood parasite C. sodalis include Megachile melanophaea, M. texana, and M. rotundata.

== Taxonomy and naming ==
The species was originally described in the Transactions of the American Entomological Society by Ezra Townsend Cresson in 1878.

== Range and distribution ==
Coelioxys sodalis are distributed across the northern portions of the North American continent from Alaska and British Columbia and Northwest Territory eastward across to Nova Scotia and the New England states, according to Mitchell. The range extends south through to high altitude regions in Arizona, according to Baker. They are most active spring through early fall. They are reportedly active as early as April 17 in Arizona and as late as September 8 in Alberta. Their habitat is primarily woodland. They have been collected in coniferous forests, as well as in deciduous forests inland and along the coast. In the lower latitudes of the range, they tend towards predominantly pine forests. Canadian specimens have been collected from the ecotone between the tundra and coniferous forest. They have also been observed in more xeric environments including sagebrush steppes.

They are recorded to have been found on flowers of genera Rhodora and Rubus.

== Morphology ==
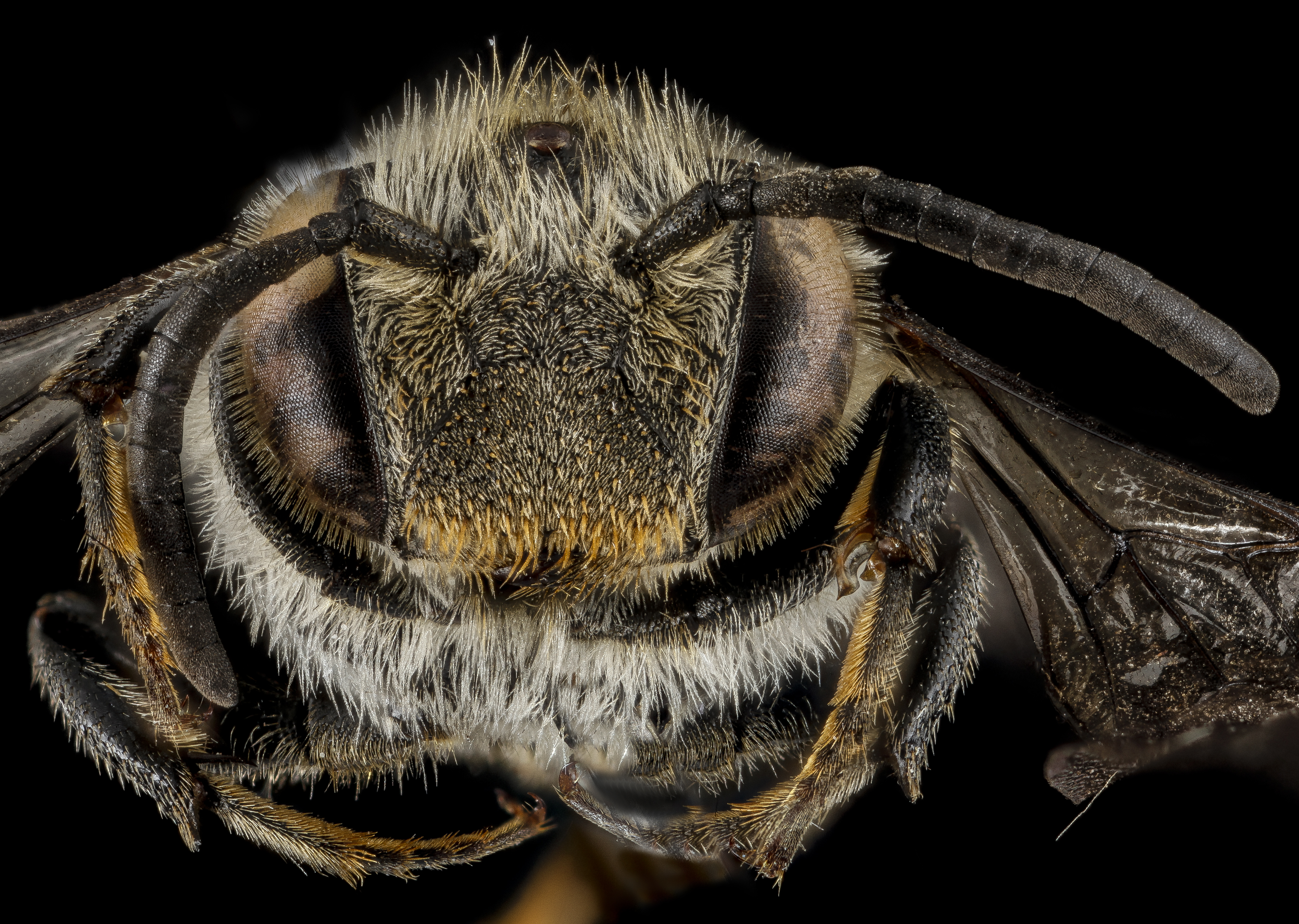
Frontal view

Highly detailed physical descriptions were published in Theodore B. Mitchell's seminal work Bees of the Eastern United States II. Bees resemble C. funeraria and darker specimens of C. rufitarsis. Morphologic characteristics of females and males differ from these two examples based on differences in segmental arrangements of components of the abdomen wall. Female bees (11–13mm) are longer than the males (8–12mm). Both males and females are black across the entire body, including tegulae and legs. Both males and females have compound eyes positioned such that they are somewhat convergent below. However, lateral ocelli of females are not as near to the vertex margin as those of males. Across the geographic range, morphological differences have been noted. C. sodalis from the southern reaches have fascia more distinctly setal. Variations in proximal arrangements of the abdominal components has also been noted. Species obtained from western reaches more closely resemble Coelioxys quadridentata.

== Molecular biology ==
Characterization of the nucleotide and protein sequences have been published, as noted in the NCBI repository.
