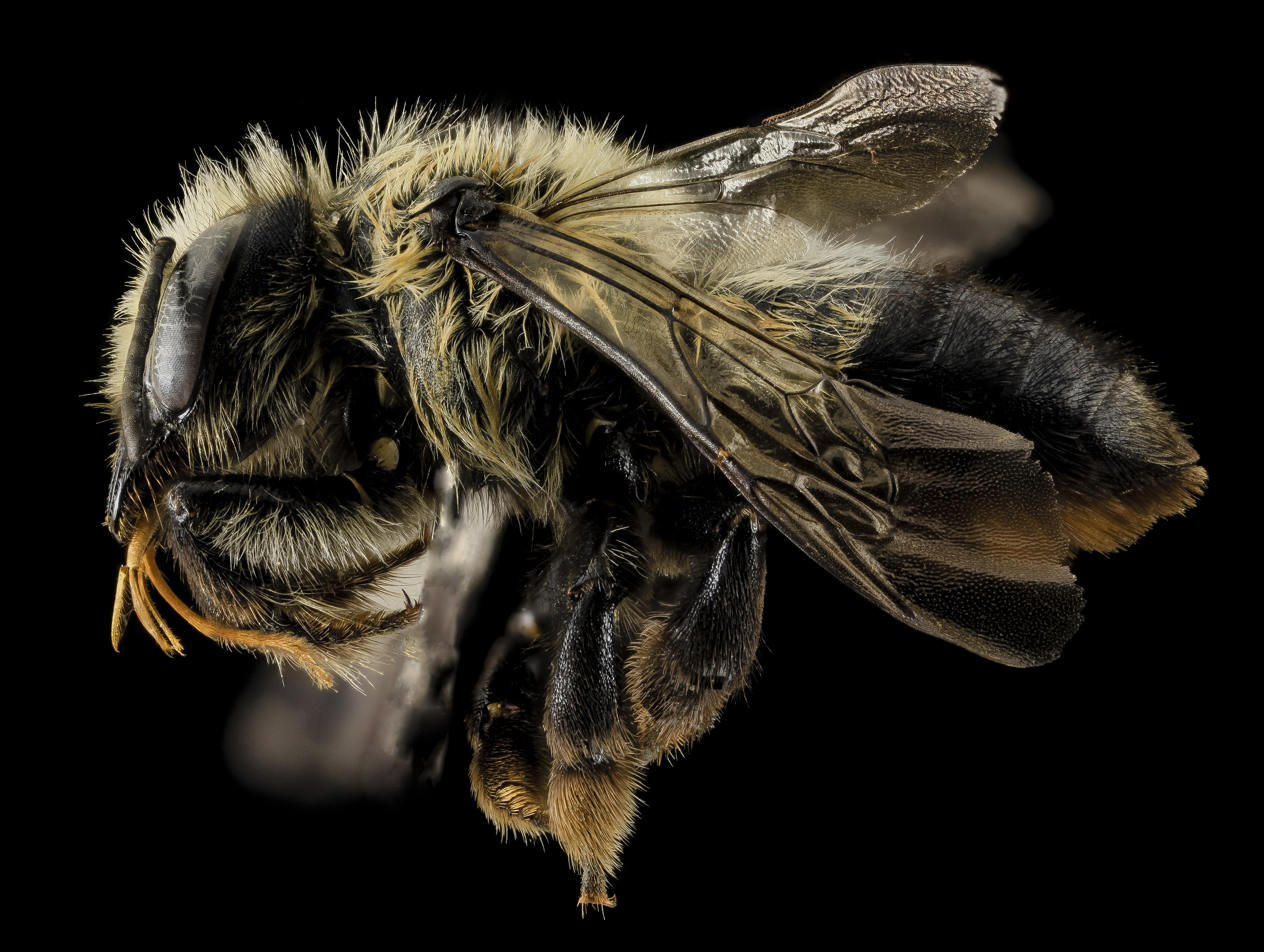

Scientific classification
- Domain: Eukaryota
- Kingdom: Animalia
- Phylum: Arthropoda
- Class: Insecta
- Order: Hymenoptera
- Family: Megachilidae
- Genus: Megachile
- Species: M. melanophaea

Binomial name
- Megachile melanophaea Smith, 1853

Synonyms
- Megachile wootoni Cockerell, 1898; Megachile femorata Provancher, 1882; Megachile pseudolatimanus Strand, 1917; Megachile tuala Strand, 1917; Megachile canadensis Friese, 1903; Megachile wootoni rohweri Cockerell, 1906; Megachile gemula fulvogemula Mitchell, 1935

= Megachile melanophaea =

Species of bee

Megachile melanophaea is a species of leaf-cutter bee in the family Megachilidae. It was first described by the British zoologist Frederick Smith in 1853. It is native to North America.

== Description ==
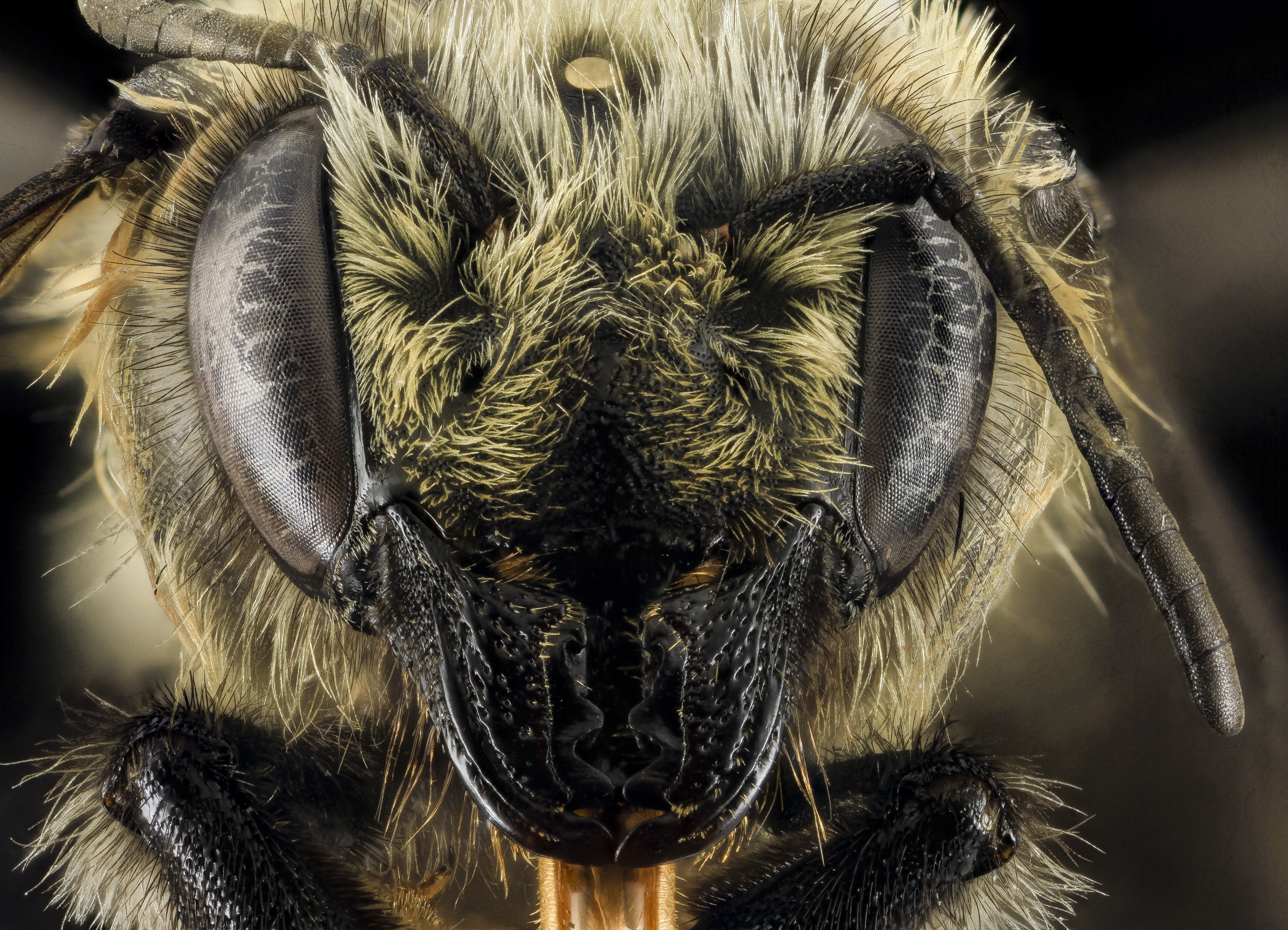
Frontal view of face

Females are 12 to 14 millimetres (0.47 to 0.55 in) long while males are 9 to 12 millimetres (0.35 to 0.47 in). The head is black and is clothed with brownish-black hairs except around the lower part of the face and the base of the antennae where the hairs are yellowish-white. The thorax is densely pubescent, the hairs being yellowish-white on the back and sides and brownish-black on the underparts and legs. The wings are translucent with brownish-black veins. The first two terga (dorsal plates) of the abdomen have erect pale hairs and the hind terga have erect black hairs. The scopa (pollen-carrying apparatus under the abdomen) has reddish-brown hairs.

== Distribution ==
Megachile melanophaea is native to North America, its range extending from Nova Scotia to British Columbia and Alaska.

== Behaviour ==
Megachile melanophaea is a common species that nests in a hole in the ground or some other small cavity. The individual cells are lined with carefully cut pieces of leaf and provisioned with nectar and pollen. A single egg is laid in each cell. This bee species is parasitized by the cuckoo bees Coelioxys sodalis and Coelioxys rufitarsus. Adult bees visit flowers for the nectar and pollen and this species has been observed pollinating the slipper orchid Cypripedium macranthos var. rebunense which is otherwise pollinated almost exclusively by queen bumble bees. Some populations of the slipper orchid Cypripedium reginae are pollinated by Megachile melanophaea while others are pollinated by the hoverfly Syrphus torvus, an unusual dual pollinator arrangement.
