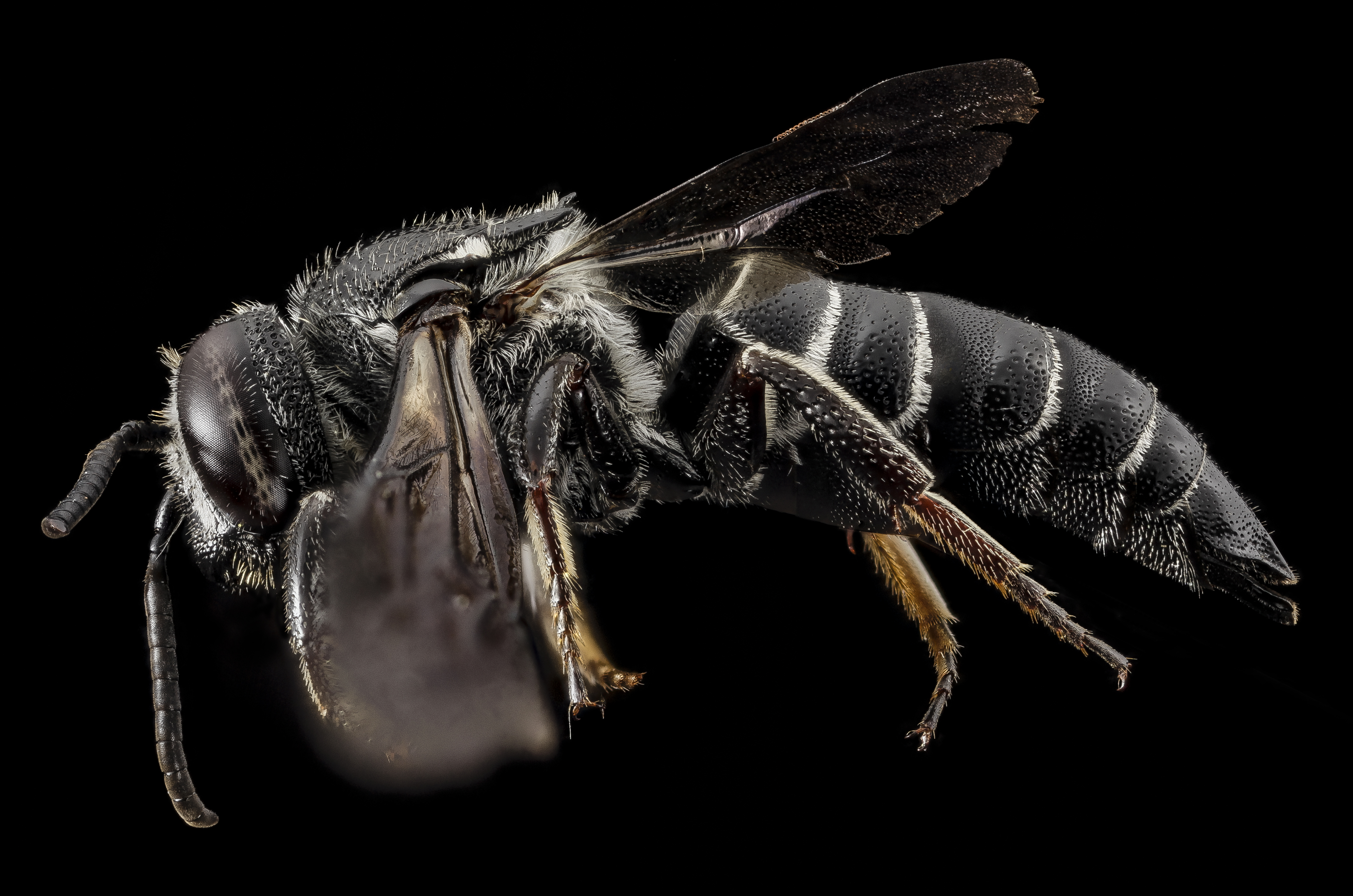
- Female

Scientific classification
- Domain: Eukaryota
- Kingdom: Animalia
- Phylum: Arthropoda
- Class: Insecta
- Order: Hymenoptera
- Family: Megachilidae
- Subfamily: Megachilinae
- Genus: Coelioxys
- Species: C. dolichos

Binomial name
- Coelioxys dolichos Fox, 1890

= Coelioxys dolichos =

Species of bee

Coelioxys dolichos is a species of bee in the family Megachilidae. It has been reared from a nest of the species Megachile xylocopoides.
