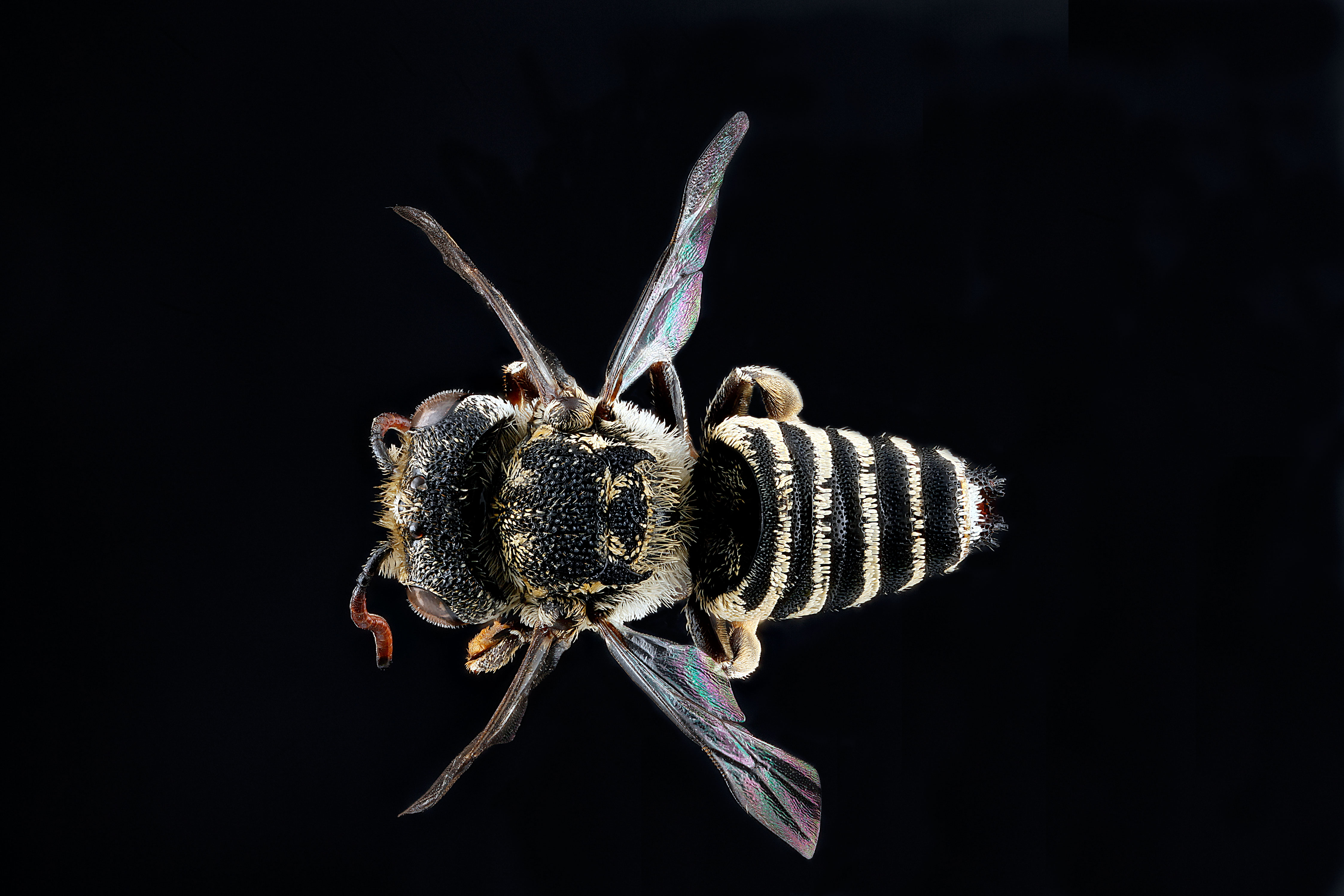
- Male

Scientific classification
- Domain: Eukaryota
- Kingdom: Animalia
- Phylum: Arthropoda
- Class: Insecta
- Order: Hymenoptera
- Family: Megachilidae
- Subfamily: Megachilinae
- Genus: Coelioxys
- Species: C. coturnix

Binomial name
- Coelioxys coturnix Pérez, 1884

= Coelioxys coturnix =

Species of bee

Coelioxys coturnix is a species of bee in the family Megachilidae.
