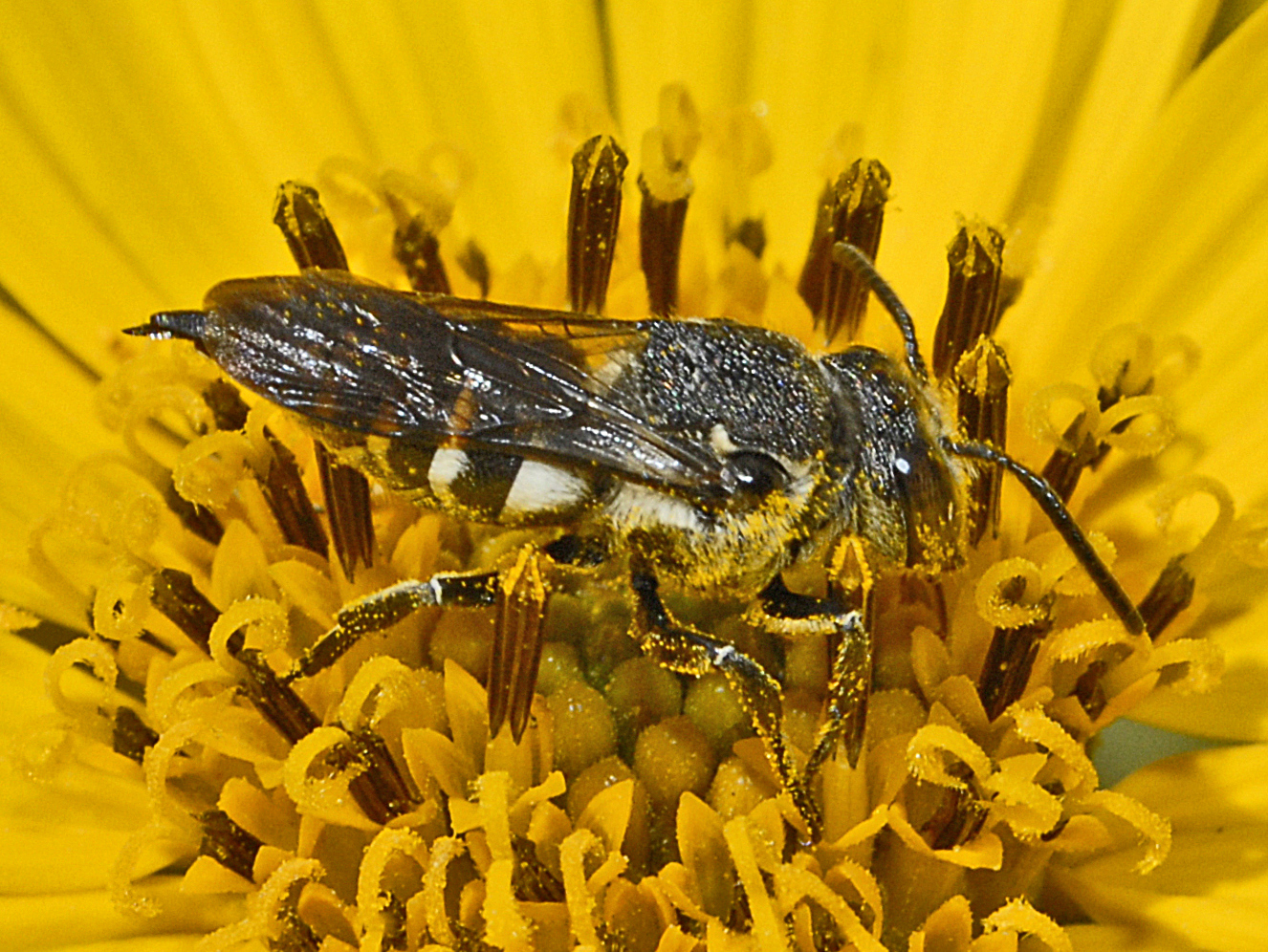
- Female of Coelioxys species

Scientific classification
- Kingdom: Animalia
- Phylum: Arthropoda
- Class: Insecta
- Order: Hymenoptera
- Family: Megachilidae
- Subfamily: Megachilinae
- Genus: Coelioxys; Latreille, 1809

Subgenera
- 15 subgenera

= Coelioxys =

Genus of bees

Coelioxys, common name leaf-cutting cuckoo bees or sharp-tailed bees, is a genus of solitary kleptoparasitic cuckoo bees belonging to the family Megachilidae.

Coelioxys cf. conoidea visits the nest of a leafcutter bee.

== Diversity ==
The genus includes about 500 species in 15 subgenera.

== Selected species ==
- Coelioxys angulatus
- Coelioxys afer
- Coelioxys apicatus
- Coelioxys banksi
- Coelioxys capitatus
- Coelioxys confusus
- Coelioxys coturnix
- Coelioxys dolichos
- Coelioxys elongatus
- Coelioxys fenestratus
- Coelioxys formosicola
- Coelioxys fuscipennis
- Coelioxys hunteri
- Coelioxys inermis
- Coelioxys menthae
- Coelioxys nitidoscutellaris
- Coelioxys perseus
- Coelioxys polycentris
- Coelioxys porterae
- Coelioxys rufitarsis
- Coelioxys sayi
- Coelioxys slossoni
- Coelioxys sodalis

Note that many adjectives need correcting to fit the masculine for gender agreement. The genus ending -oxys is from Latinized Greek and is masculine, despite any earlier usage of feminine adjectives.

== Distribution ==
Coelioxys species can be found in most European countries, in the Afrotropical realm, in the East Palearctic realm, in North Africa, in India, in the Nearctic and Neotropics.

== Description ==
Bees within this genus can reach a length of 8–12 millimetres (0.31–0.47 in). They show a broad head with large complex eyes and broad thorax and abdomen. Their body is only moderately hairy. They are usually black with white hair stripes. Legs may be red or black. The females of Coelioxys species have a long pointed abdomen that resembles a cone, used to pierce the leaf lining in the laying of eggs. The male's abdomen is armed with spines or teeth.

They are known to sometimes sleep upside down on vegetation.

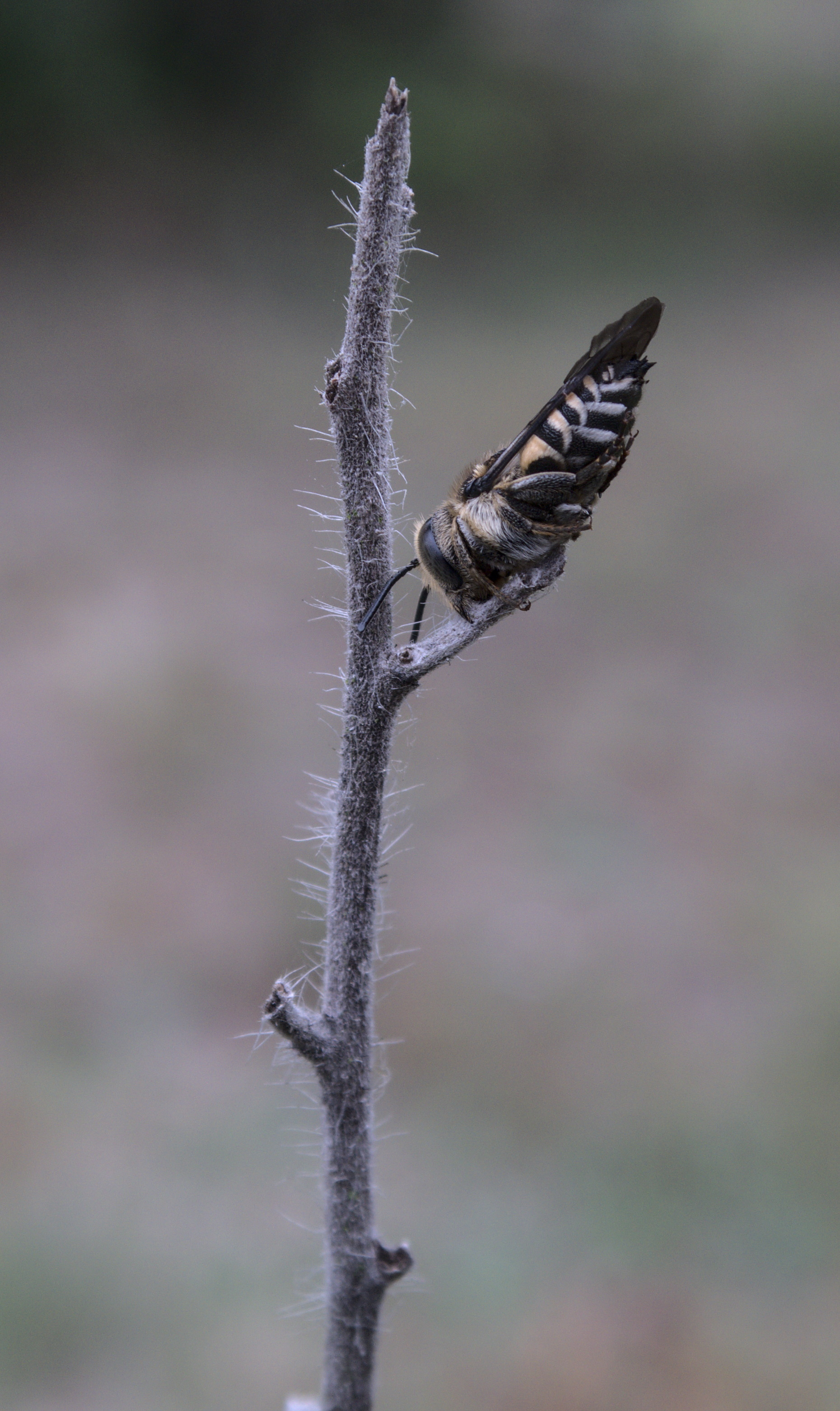
Coelioxys sp. sleeping, held in place by its mandibles

== Biology ==
These cuckoo bees are usually active from June to September, depending on the specific host species. They have no pollen-carrying adaptations, as they do not need to provision nests. Adults feed on nectar at flowers of a wide range of different nectar plants. In fact they mainly lay their eggs in the nests of bees in the genus Megachile, but also in the nests of Osmia and Anthophora, on their provisions of pollen. As this behavior is similar to that of cuckoos, such bees are sometimes referred to as "cuckoo bees". These host-parasite relationships are quite complex. The larvae of Coelioxys species kill the host larvae with their strongly developed mandibles and feed on the host's pollen provisions. They spin a cocoon at 11–16 days. These species are usually univoltine, but for some species a second generation is possible.

== Gallery ==
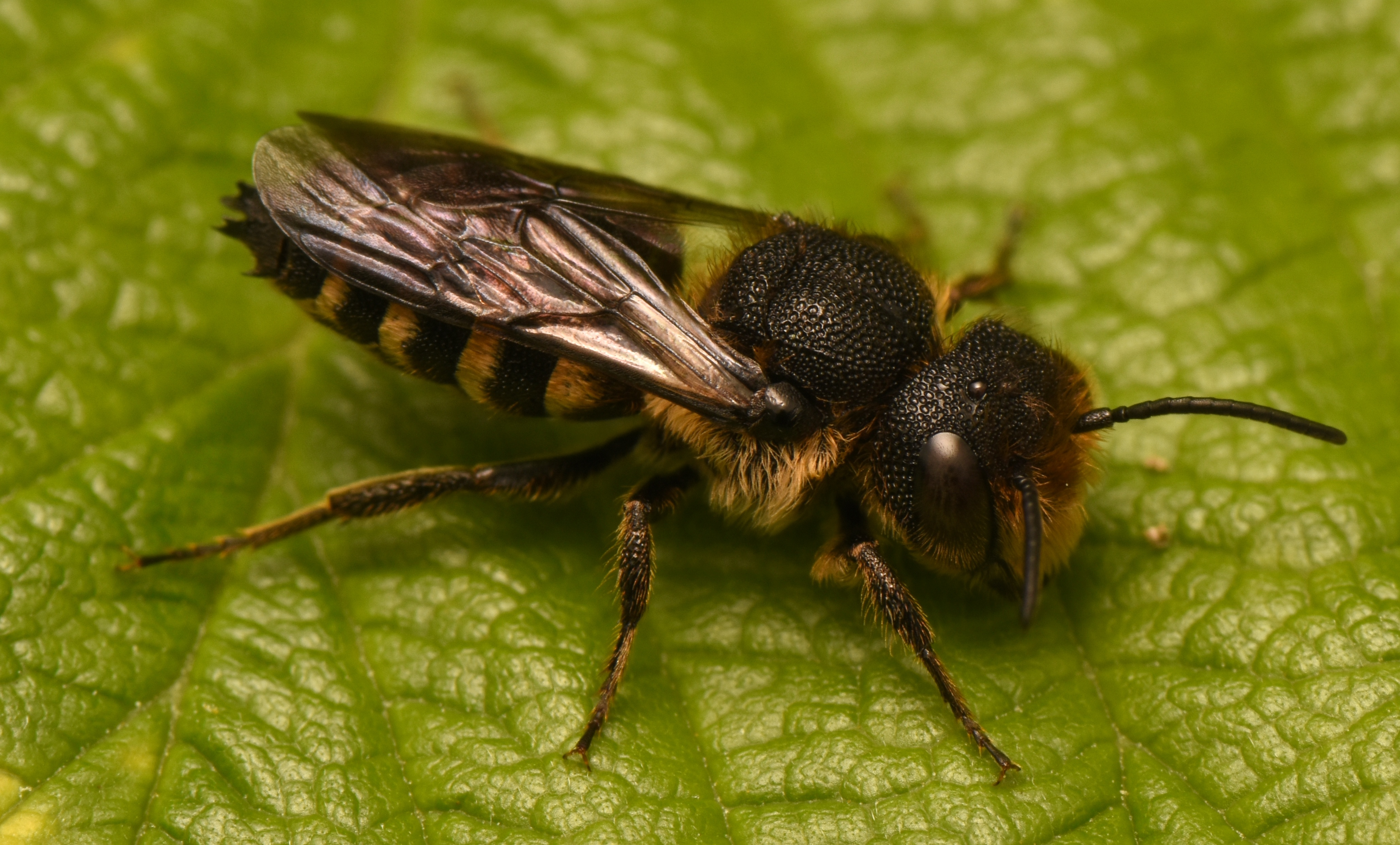
Coelioxys rufescens

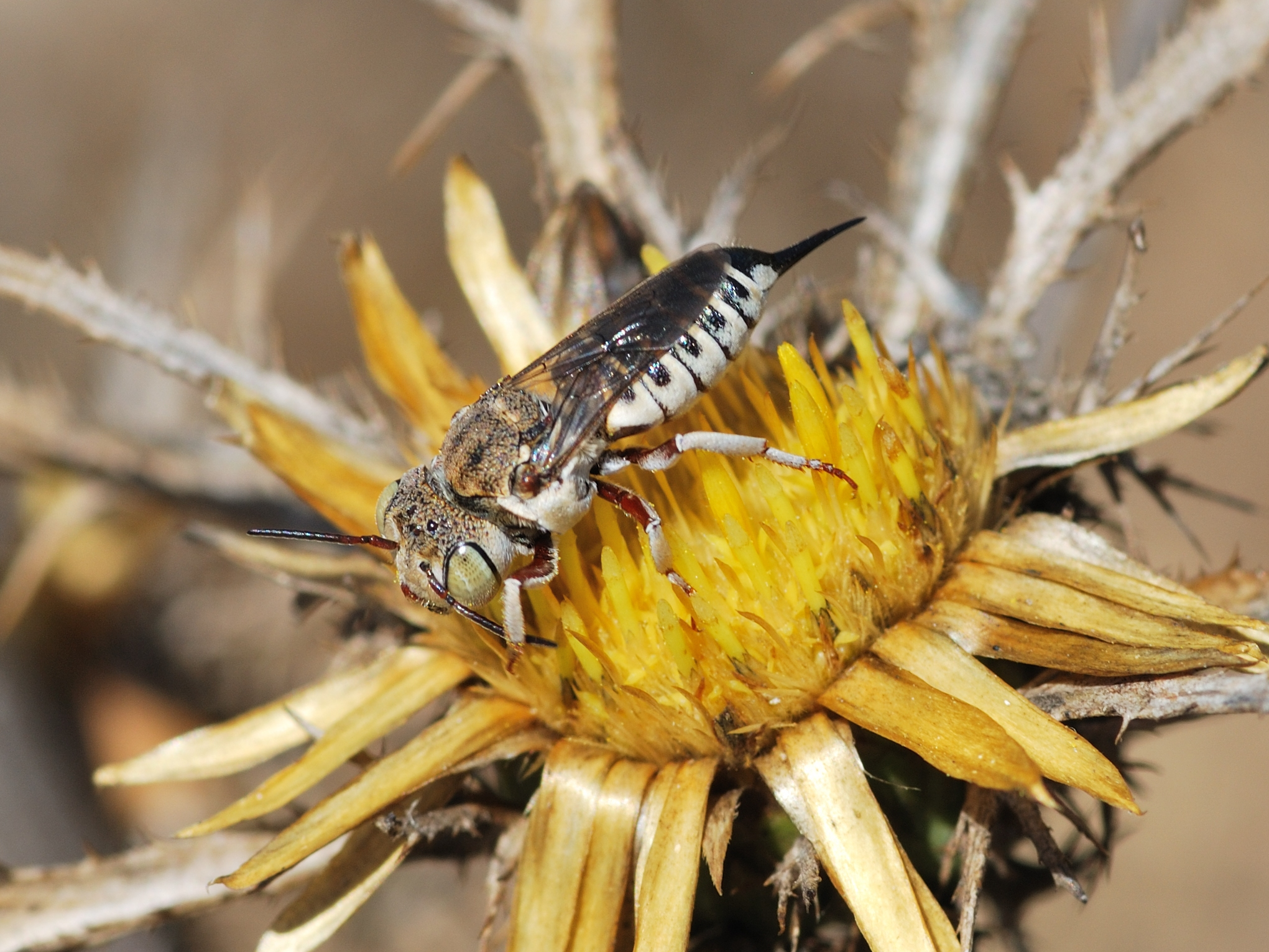
Coelioxys acanthura

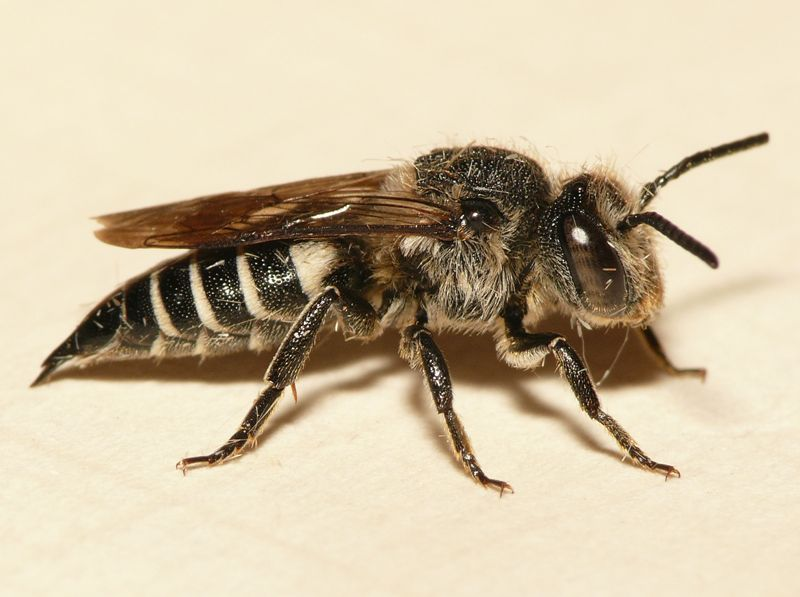
Coelioxys inermis

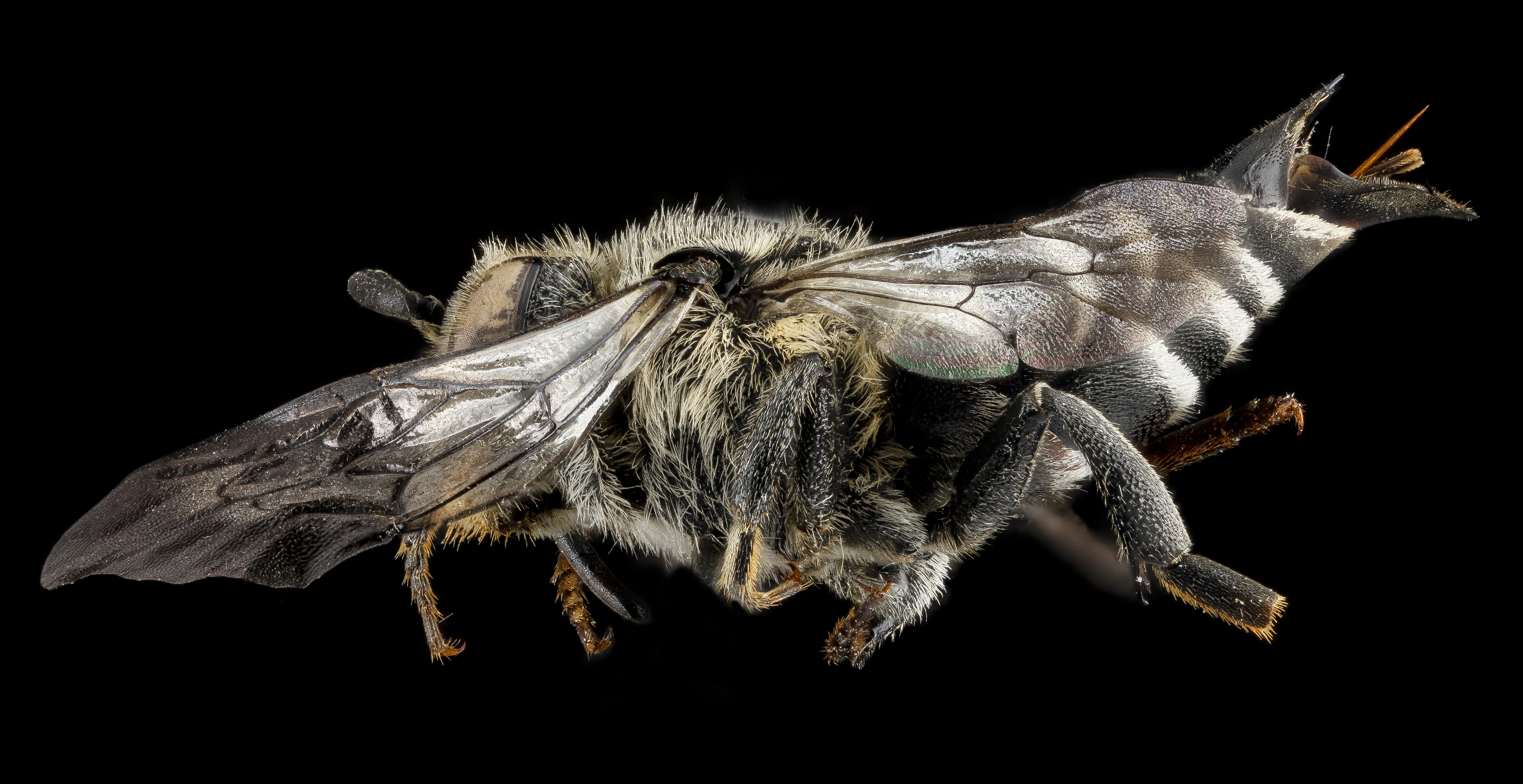
Coelioxys sodalis
