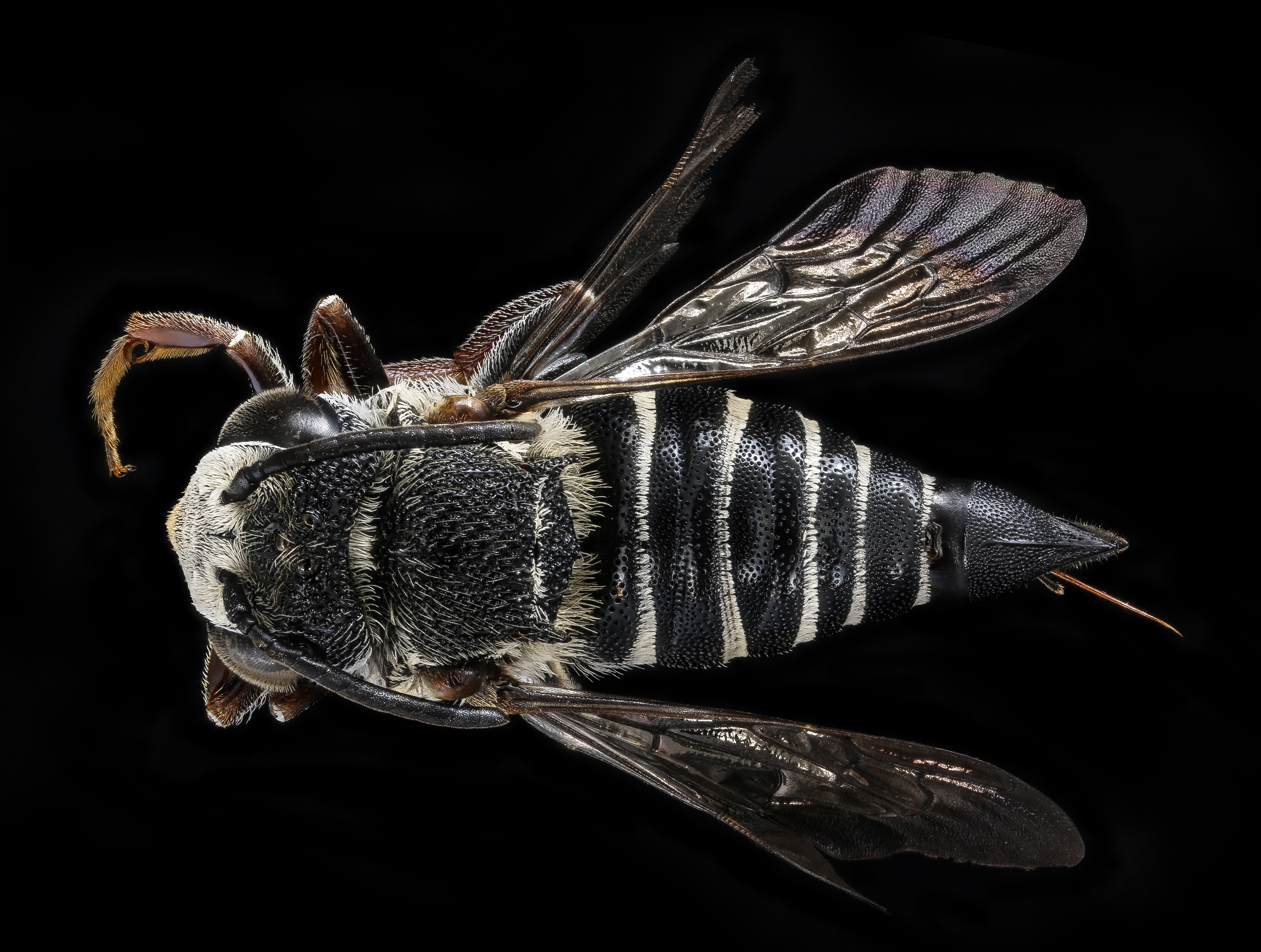
- Female

Scientific classification
- Domain: Eukaryota
- Kingdom: Animalia
- Phylum: Arthropoda
- Class: Insecta
- Order: Hymenoptera
- Family: Megachilidae
- Genus: Coelioxys
- Species: C. banksi

Binomial name
- Coelioxys banksi Crawford, 1914

= Coelioxys banksi =

Species of bee

Coelioxys banksi is a species of leafcutter bees in the family Megachilidae. It is a parasite of Megachile relativa nests.
