= Coelioxys perseus =

Scientific classification
- Kingdom: Animalia
- Phylum: Arthropoda
- Class: Insecta
- Order: Hymenoptera
- Family: Megachilidae
- Genus: Coelioxys
- Species: C. perseus

Binomial name
- Coelioxys perseus Nurse, 1904

Synonyms
- Coelioxys minuta Smith, 1879 (Preocc.); Coelioxys minutissima Strand, 1917

Species of bee

Coelioxys perseus is a species of leaf-cutting bee in the genus Coelioxys, of the family Megachilidae. It is found in India, and records from Sri Lanka are uncertain.
