= Coelioxys apicatus =

Scientific classification
- Domain: Eukaryota
- Kingdom: Animalia
- Phylum: Arthropoda
- Class: Insecta
- Order: Hymenoptera
- Family: Megachilidae
- Genus: Coelioxys
- Species: C. apicatus

Binomial name
- Coelioxys apicatus Smith, 1854

Synonyms
- Coelioxys argentifrons Smith, 1875; Coelioxys lanuginea Vachal, 1903; Liothyrapis (Liothyrapis) apicata (Smith, 1854)

Species of bee

Coelioxys apicatus is a species of leaf-cutting bee in the genus Coelioxys, of the family Megachilidae.

It is found in South Asia.
