= Coelioxys capitatus =

Scientific classification
- Domain: Eukaryota
- Kingdom: Animalia
- Phylum: Arthropoda
- Class: Insecta
- Order: Hymenoptera
- Family: Megachilidae
- Genus: Coelioxys
- Species: C. capitatus

Binomial name
- Coelioxys capitatus Smith, 1854

Synonyms
- Coelioxys capitata Smith, 1854

Species of bee

Coelioxys capitatus is a species of leaf-cutting bee in the genus Coelioxys, of the family Megachilidae. It is found in India, and recordings from Sri Lanka are uncertain, but considered true.
