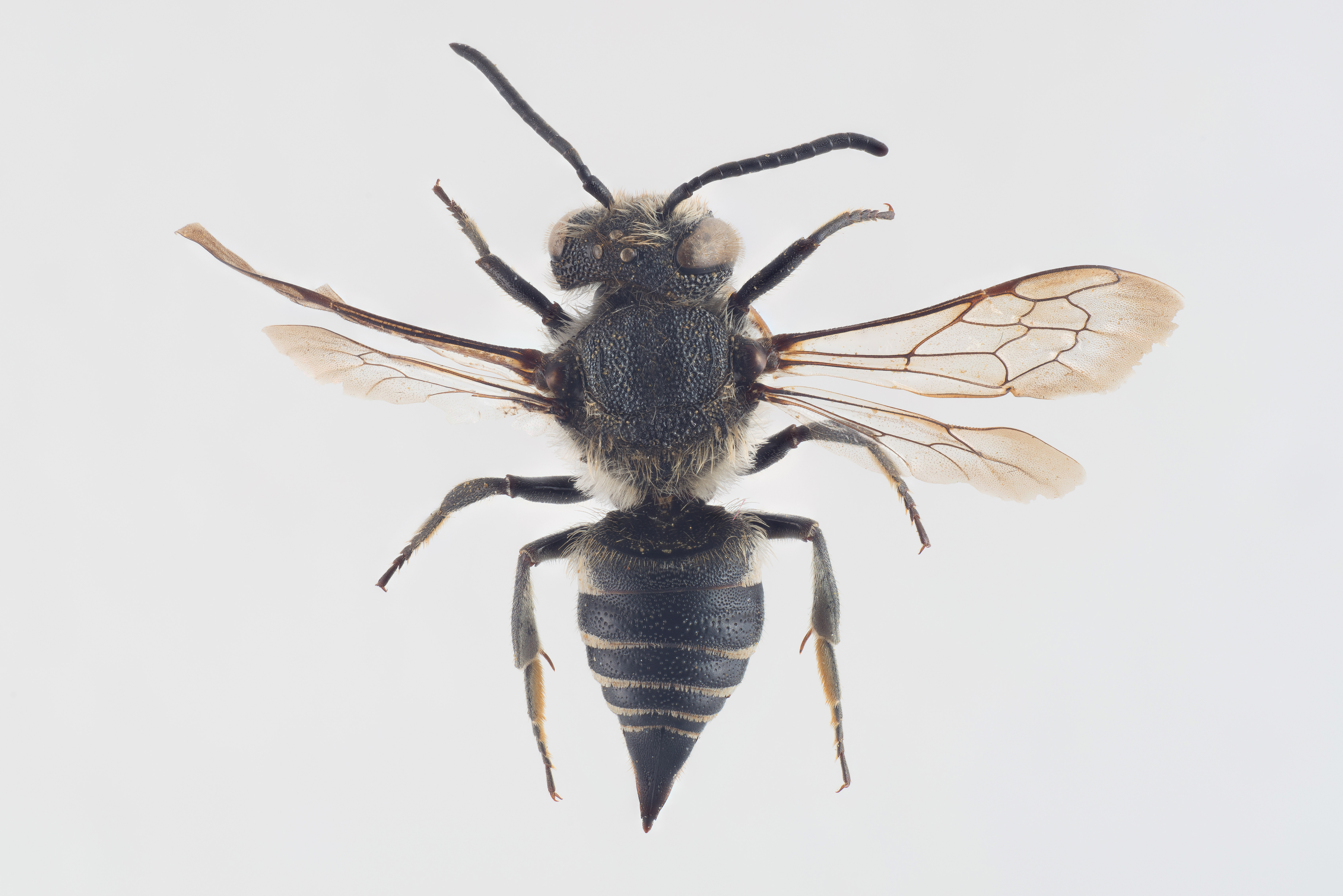
- Female

Scientific classification
- Domain: Eukaryota
- Kingdom: Animalia
- Phylum: Arthropoda
- Class: Insecta
- Order: Hymenoptera
- Family: Megachilidae
- Subfamily: Megachilinae
- Genus: Coelioxys
- Species: C. elongatus

Binomial name
- Coelioxys elongatus Lepeletier,1841

Synonyms
- Coelioxys elongata Lepeletier, 1841; Coelioxys simplex Nylander, 1852 (Preocc.); Coelioxys tricuspidata Förster, 1853; Coelioxys denticulata Schenck, 1855; Coelioxys stigmatica Schenck, 1855; Coelioxys distincta Schenck, 1855; Coelioxys sponsa Smith, 1855; Coelioxys tridenticulata Schenck, 1861; Coelioxys gracilis Schenck, 1861; Coelioxys obscura Schenck, 1861; Coelioxys claripennis Schenck, 1870; Coelioxys kudiana Cockerell, 1924; Coelioxys popovici Friese, 1925

= Coelioxys elongatus =

Species of bee

Coelioxys elongatus is a Palearctic species of sharp-tailed bee.
