= Coelioxys formosicola =

Scientific classification
- Kingdom: Animalia
- Phylum: Arthropoda
- Class: Insecta
- Order: Hymenoptera
- Family: Megachilidae
- Genus: Coelioxys
- Species: C. formosicola

Binomial name
- Coelioxys formosicola Strand, 1913

Synonyms
- Coelioxys taiwanensis Cockerell, 1927; Coelioxys (Allocoelioxys) manchurica Proschchalykin and Lelej, 2004

Species of bee

Coelioxys formosicola is a species of leaf-cutting bee in the genus Coelioxys, of the family Megachilidae.
