= Coelioxys nitidoscutellaris =

Scientific classification
- Domain: Eukaryota
- Kingdom: Animalia
- Phylum: Arthropoda
- Class: Insecta
- Order: Hymenoptera
- Family: Megachilidae
- Genus: Coelioxys
- Species: C. nitidoscutellaris

Binomial name
- Coelioxys nitidoscutellaris Pasteels, 1987

Species of bee

Coelioxys nitidoscutellaris is a species of leaf-cutting bee in the genus Coelioxys, of the family Megachilidae.

It is found in South Asia.
