= Megachile deceptoria =

Scientific classification
- Domain: Eukaryota
- Kingdom: Animalia
- Phylum: Arthropoda
- Class: Insecta
- Order: Hymenoptera
- Family: Megachilidae
- Genus: Megachile
- Species: M. deceptoria

Binomial name
- Megachile deceptoria Pérez, 1890

Species of leafcutter bee (Megachile)

Megachile deceptoria is a species of bee in the family Megachilidae. It was described by Pérez in 1890.
