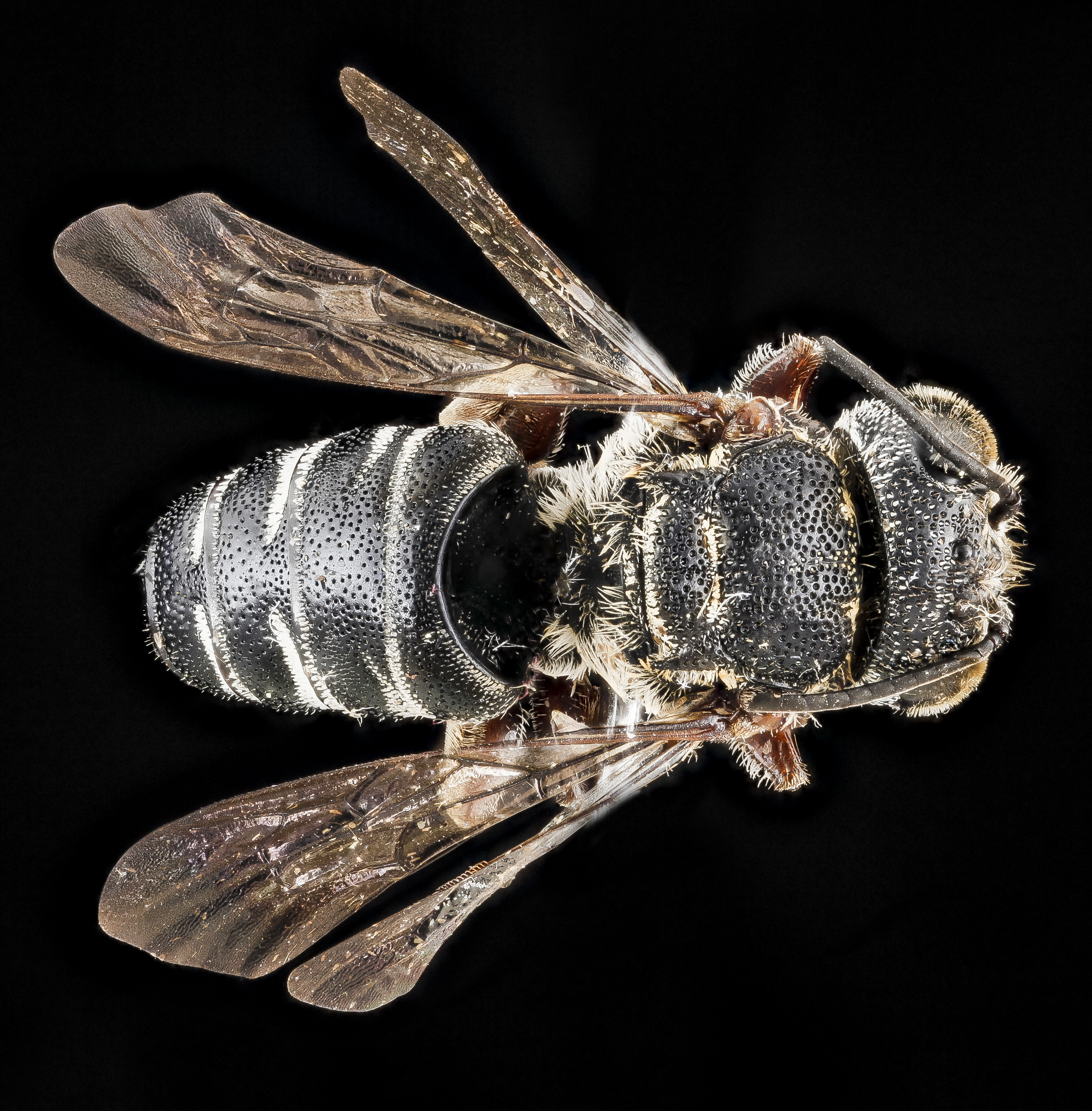
- Male

Scientific classification
- Domain: Eukaryota
- Kingdom: Animalia
- Phylum: Arthropoda
- Class: Insecta
- Order: Hymenoptera
- Family: Megachilidae
- Genus: Coelioxys
- Species: C. hunteri

Binomial name
- Coelioxys hunteri Crawford, 1914

= Coelioxys hunteri =

Species of bee

Coelioxys hunteri is a species of hymenopteran in the family Megachilidae.
