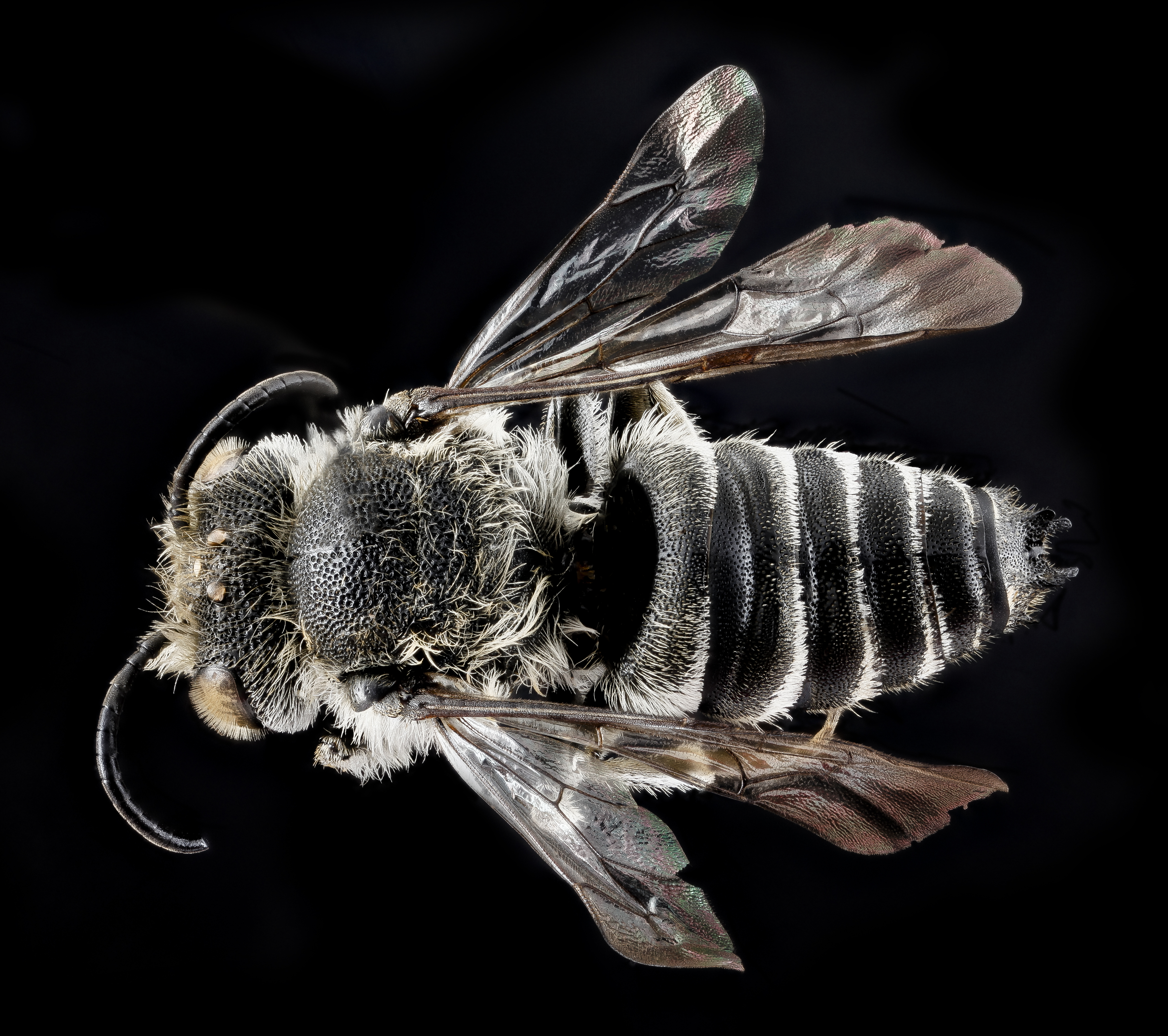
- Male

Scientific classification
- Kingdom: Animalia
- Phylum: Arthropoda
- Class: Insecta
- Order: Hymenoptera
- Family: Megachilidae
- Genus: Coelioxys
- Species: C. porterae

Binomial name
- Coelioxys porterae Cockerell, 1900

= Coelioxys porterae =

Species of bee

Coelioxys porterae is a species of bee in the family Megachilidae.
