= Coelioxys angulatus =

Scientific classification
- Domain: Eukaryota
- Kingdom: Animalia
- Phylum: Arthropoda
- Class: Insecta
- Order: Hymenoptera
- Family: Megachilidae
- Genus: Coelioxys
- Species: C. angulatus

Binomial name
- Coelioxys angulatus Smith, 1870

Species of bee

Coelioxys angulatus is a species of leaf-cutting bee in the genus Coelioxys, of the family Megachilidae.
