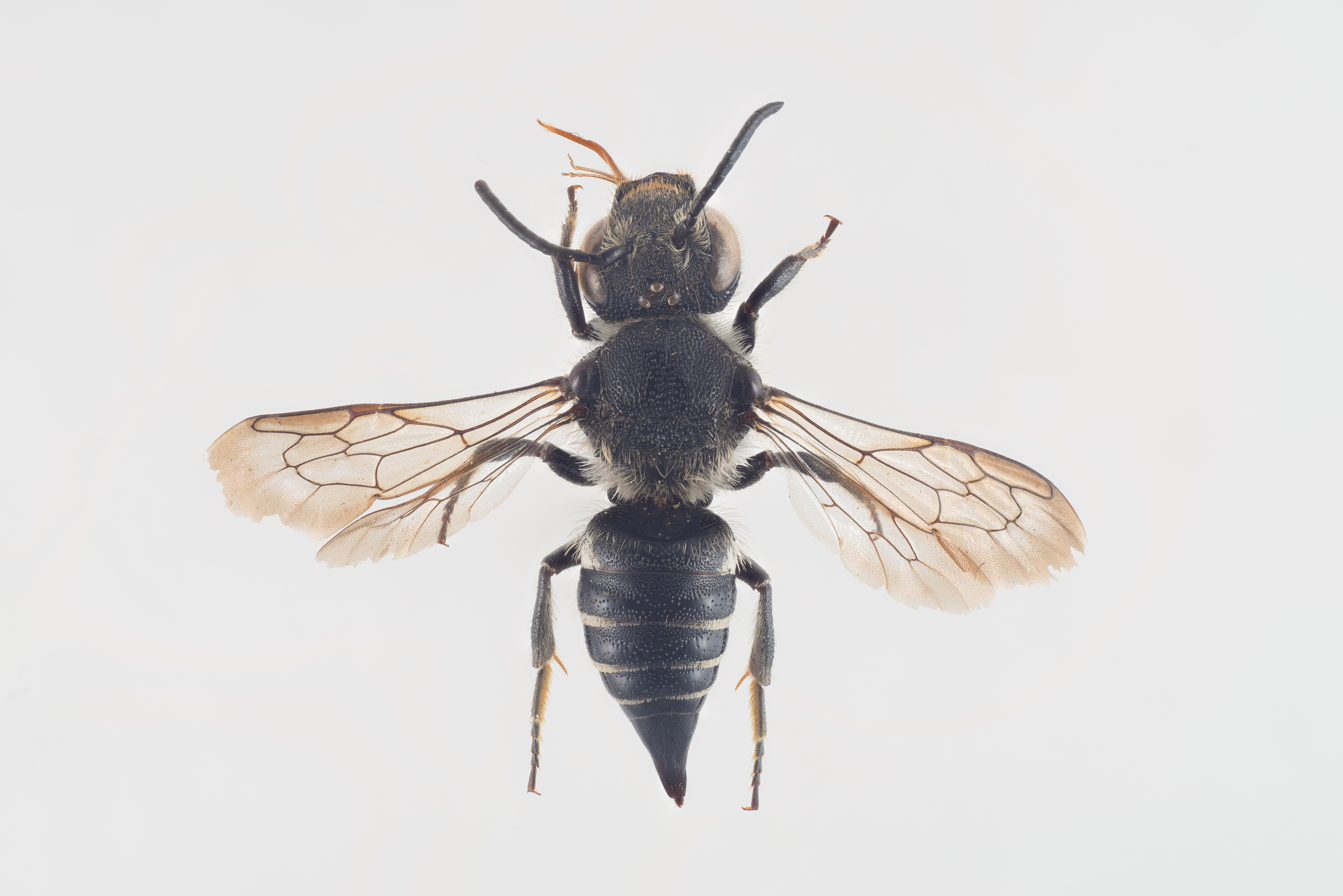
- Female

Scientific classification
- Domain: Eukaryota
- Kingdom: Animalia
- Phylum: Arthropoda
- Class: Insecta
- Order: Hymenoptera
- Family: Megachilidae
- Subfamily: Megachilinae
- Genus: Coelioxys
- Species: C. inermis

Binomial name
- Coelioxys inermis (Kirby, 1802)

= Coelioxys inermis =

Species of bee

Coelioxys inermis is a Palearctic species of sharp-tailed bee.
