= Coelioxys fenestratus =

Scientific classification
- Kingdom: Animalia
- Phylum: Arthropoda
- Clade: Pancrustacea
- Class: Insecta
- Order: Hymenoptera
- Family: Megachilidae
- Genus: Coelioxys
- Species: C. fenestratus

Binomial name
- Coelioxys fenestratus Smith, 1873

Synonyms
- Coelioxys fenestrata Smith, 1873; Liothyrapis fenestrata (Smith, 1873)

Species of bee

Coelioxys fenestratus is a species of leaf-cutting bee in the genus Coelioxys, of the family Megachilidae. It is found in India, and recordings from Sri Lanka are uncertain. It is also found in Korea, Japan, and China

The species was first described in 1873 by Frederick Smith as Coelioxys fenestrata, who described a female collected in Hakodadi, North China:

Female. Length 7 1/2 lines. Black: head and thorax coarsely rugose; the first, second and third segments of the abdomen evenly and rather strongly punctured; the two following segments very finely punctured at the base, and more strongly so towards their apical margins; the sixth segment elongated and acute, the inferior plate of the segment prolonged a little beyond the upper one; on each side of the scutellum is a short tooth which is curved downwards. The face densely clothed with short bright fulvous pubescence; the wings dark fuscous, with their base hyaline. The apical margins of the segments of the abdomen are very narrowly fringed with white pubescence.
