= Coelioxys confusus =

Scientific classification
- Domain: Eukaryota
- Kingdom: Animalia
- Phylum: Arthropoda
- Class: Insecta
- Order: Hymenoptera
- Family: Megachilidae
- Genus: Coelioxys
- Species: C. confusus

Binomial name
- Coelioxys confusus Smith, 1875

Synonyms
- Coelioxys confusa Smith, 1875; Coelioxys fuscipes Cameron, 1913; Coelioxys siamensis Cockerell, 1911; Coelioxys stolida Nurse, 1903; Coelioxys tenuilineata Cameron, 1913

Species of bee

Coelioxys confusus is a species of leaf-cutting bee in the genus Coelioxys, of the family Megachilidae. It is found in Himachal Pradesh, India, and while recordings from Sri Lanka are uncertain, they are considered to be true.
