= Coelioxys menthae =

Scientific classification
- Kingdom: Animalia
- Phylum: Arthropoda
- Class: Insecta
- Order: Hymenoptera
- Family: Megachilidae
- Subfamily: Megachilinae
- Genus: Coelioxys
- Species: C. menthae

Binomial name
- Coelioxys menthae Cockerell, 1897

Species of bee

Coelioxys menthae is a species of bee in the family Megachilidae.
