= Coelioxys slossoni =

Scientific classification
- Domain: Eukaryota
- Kingdom: Animalia
- Phylum: Arthropoda
- Class: Insecta
- Order: Hymenoptera
- Family: Megachilidae
- Subfamily: Megachilinae
- Genus: Coelioxys
- Species: C. slossoni

Binomial name
- Coelioxys slossoni Viereck, 1902

Species of bee

Coelioxys slossoni is a species of bee in the family Megachilidae.

== Subspecies ==
These two subspecies belong to the species Coelioxys slossoni:

- Coelioxys slossoni arenicola
- Coelioxys slossoni slossoni
