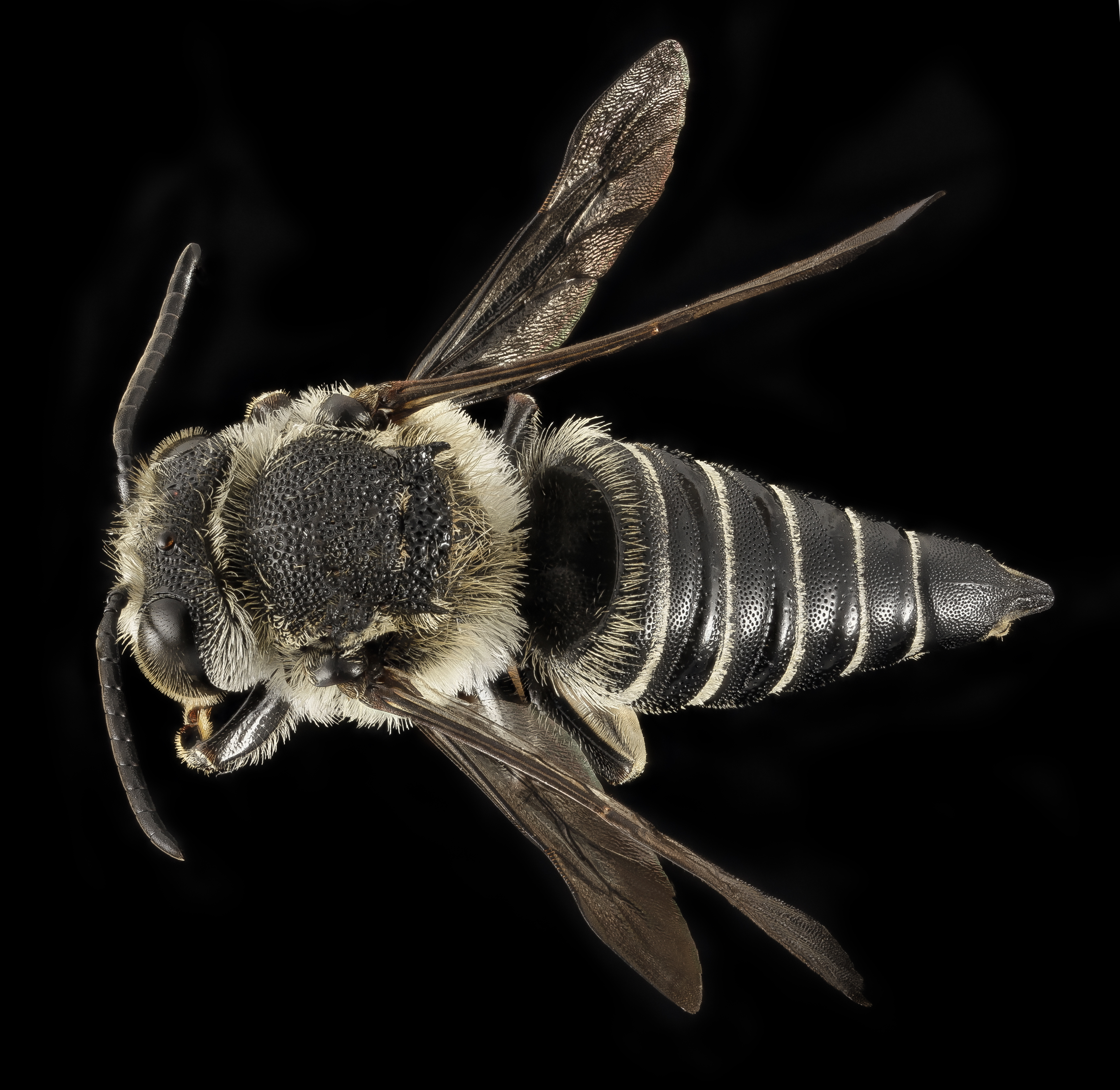
- Female

Scientific classification
- Domain: Eukaryota
- Kingdom: Animalia
- Phylum: Arthropoda
- Class: Insecta
- Order: Hymenoptera
- Family: Megachilidae
- Genus: Coelioxys
- Species: C. rufitarsis

Binomial name
- Coelioxys rufitarsis Smith, 1854

= Coelioxys rufitarsis =

Species of bee

Coelioxys rufitarsis, common name red-legged cuckoo leafcutter bee, is a species of bee in the family Megachilidae. It is native to North America.

This cuckoo bee parasitizes the nests of several other bee species, including Megachile latimanus, M. melanophoea, and M. perihirta.
