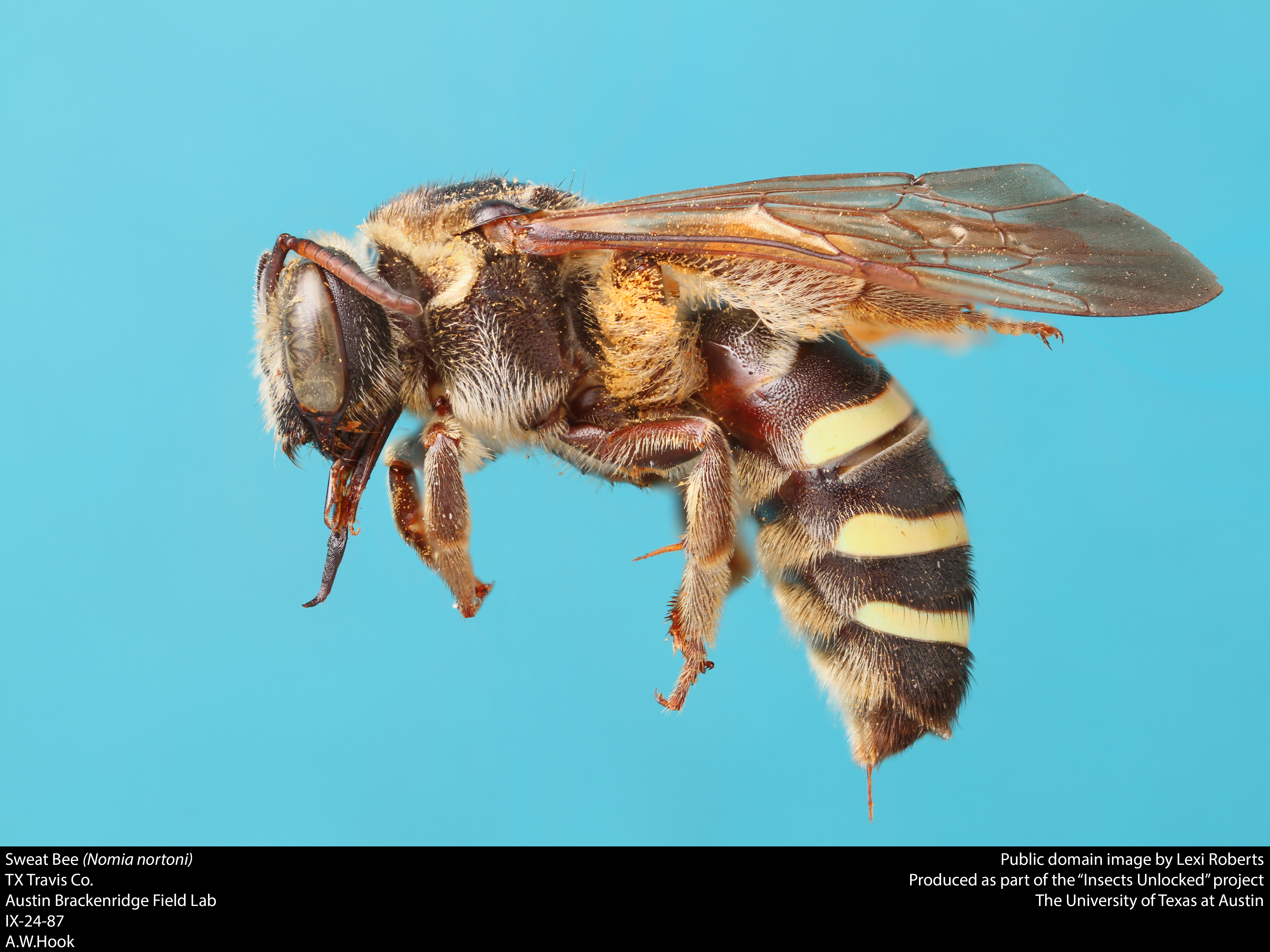

Scientific classification
- Domain: Eukaryota
- Kingdom: Animalia
- Phylum: Arthropoda
- Class: Insecta
- Order: Hymenoptera
- Family: Halictidae
- Genus: Nomia
- Subgenus: Nomia (Acunomia)
- Species: N. nortoni

Binomial name
- Nomia nortoni Cresson, 1868

= Nomia nortoni =

Species of bee

Nomia nortoni is a species of sweat bee in the family Halictidae. It is found in Central America and North America.

== Subspecies ==
Two subspecies belong to the species Nomia nortoni:

- Nomia nortoni cressoni Westwood, 1875
- Nomia nortoni nortoni Cresson, 1868
