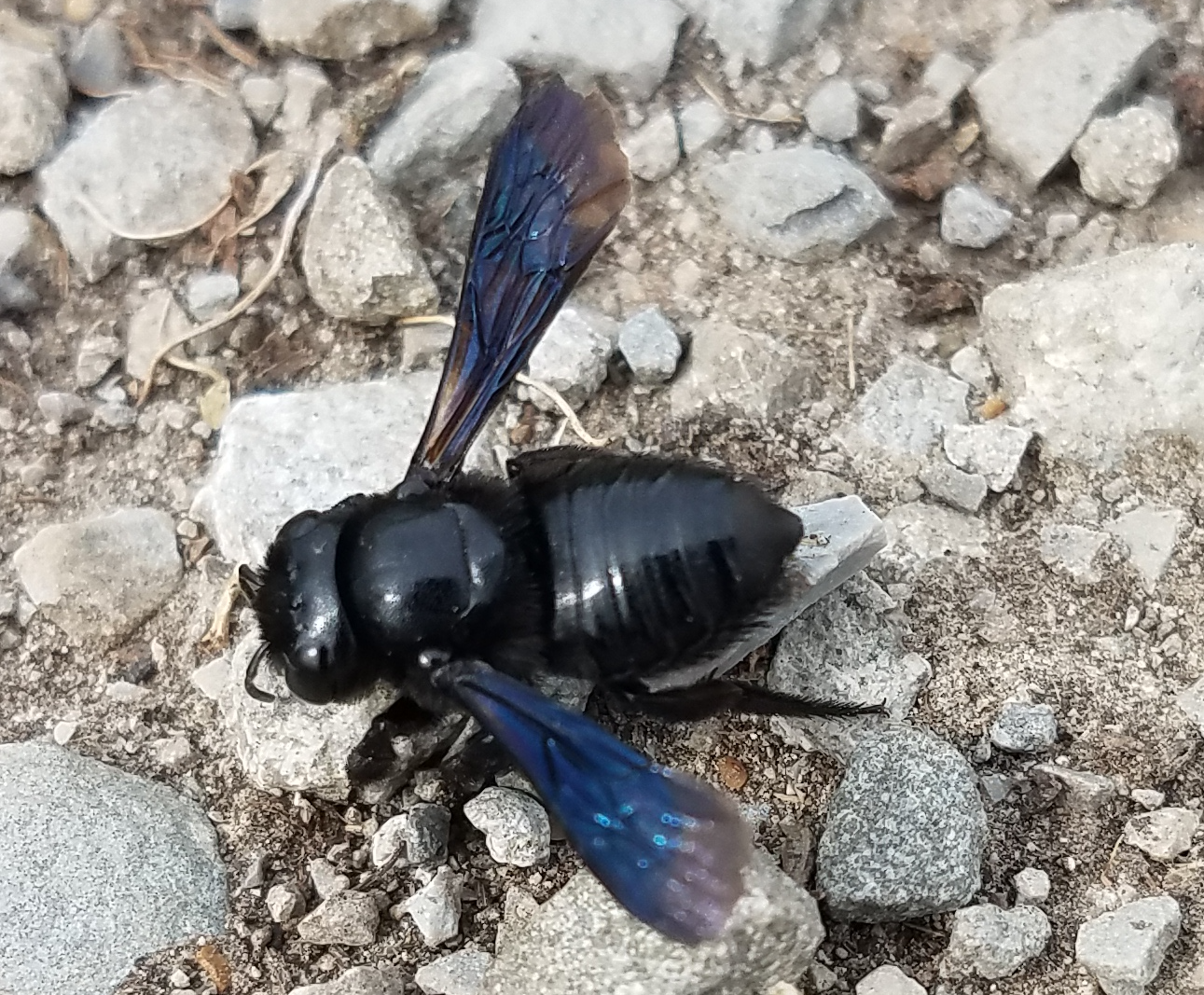
- Female

Scientific classification
- Domain: Eukaryota
- Kingdom: Animalia
- Phylum: Arthropoda
- Class: Insecta
- Order: Hymenoptera
- Family: Megachilidae
- Genus: Megachile
- Species: M. xylocopoides

Binomial name
- Megachile xylocopoides Smith, 1853

= Megachile xylocopoides =

Species of leafcutter bee (Megachile)

Megachile xylocopoides, the carpenter-mimic leafcutter bee, is a species of bee in the family Megachilidae. It was described by Smith in 1853 and named for its superficial similarity to the carpenter bee genus Xylocopa

Its range is the United States from eastern Texas to southeast Pennsylvania.
