= List of Nomia species =

This is a list of species in the bee genus Nomia.

== Nomia species ==
- Nomia albofasciata Smith, 1875
- Nomia alluaudi (Pauly, 2000)
- Nomia amabilis Cockerell, 1908
- Nomia amboinensis Cockerell, 1907
- Nomia ampliata Vachal, 1903
- Nomia angustitibialis Ribble, 1965
- Nomia antecedens Cockerell, 1931
- Nomia anthracoptera Cockerell, 1918
- Nomia apicalis Friese, 1941
- Nomia ardjuna Cockerell, 1911
- Nomia atripes Friese, 1909
- Nomia aurantifer Cockerell, 1910
- Nomia aurata Bingham, 1897
- Nomia austrovagans Cockerell, 1905
- Nomia bicoloripes Walker, 1871
- Nomia bongo (Pauly, 2000)
- Nomia borneana Cameron, 1902
- Nomia bouyssoui Vachal, 1903
- Nomia brevipes Friese, 1914
- Nomia brothersi (Pauly, 2000)
- Nomia buddha Westwood, 1875
- Nomia callichlora Cockerell, 1911
- Nomia camerunensis (Pauly, 1990)
- Nomia candida Smith, 1875
- Nomia capitata Smith, 1875
- Nomia carinata Smith, 1875
- Nomia chalybeata Smith, 1875
- Nomia chandleri (Ashmead, 1899)
- Nomia clavicauda Cockerell, 1947
- Nomia clypeonitida (Pauly, 2000)
- Nomia crassipes (Fabricius, 1789)
- Nomia crassiuscula Friese, 1913
- Nomia crocisaeformis Bingham, 1903
- Nomia cuneata Saussure, 1890
- Nomia curvipes (Fabricius, 1793)
- Nomia darwinorum Cockerell, 1910
- Nomia dayi (Pauly, 1997)
- Nomia dimidiata Vachal, 1897
- Nomia eburneifrons Walker, 1871
- Nomia elegans Smith, 1857
- Nomia elegantula Friese, 1913
- Nomia elephas Strand, 1911
- Nomia ellioti Smith, 1875
- Nomia epileuca Cockerell, 1939
- Nomia ethiopica (Pauly, 2000)
- Nomia expulsa Cockerell, 1918
- Nomia fedorensis Cockerell, 1910
- Nomia felina Cockerell, 1947
- Nomia ferruginipennis Cockerell, 1947
- Nomia ferruginipes Cockerell, 1947
- Nomia flavipennis Friese, 1909
- Nomia forbesii (W. F. Kirby, 1900)
- Nomia formosa Smith, 1858
- Nomia foxii Dalla Torre, 1896
- Nomia froggatti Cockerell, 1911
- Nomia fulvata (Fabricius, 1804)
- Nomia fuscipennis Smith, 1875
- Nomia garambensis (Pauly, 2000)
- Nomia gorytoides Strand, 1911
- Nomia granulata Vachal, 1903
- Nomia guangxiensis Wu, 1983
- Nomia howardi Crawford, 1911
- Nomia incerta Gribodo, 1894
- Nomia iridescens Smith, 1853
- Nomia ivoirensis (Pauly, 1990)
- Nomia kinduna Strand, 1920
- Nomia laevidorsata Benoist, 1962
- Nomia lusoria Cockerell, 1919
- Nomia lutea Warncke, 1976
- Nomia lyonsiae Cockerell, 1912
- Nomia maculata Friese, 1904
- Nomia maneei Cockerell, 1910
- Nomia marana Cockerell, 1941
- Nomia marginata (Pauly, 1990)
- Nomia maturans Cockerell, 1912
- Nomia mcgregori Cockerell, 1920
- Nomia medionitens Cockerell, 1947
- Nomia medogensis Wu, 1988
- Nomia megasoma Cockerell, 1912
- Nomia melanderi Cockerell, 1906 (alkali bee)
- Nomia microlutea (Pauly, 2000)
- Nomia mimosae Cockerell, 1925
- Nomia mirabilis Friese, 1910
- Nomia mlanjensis (Pauly, 2000)
- Nomia montana Friese, 1941
- Nomia montivaga Friese, 1941
- Nomia nasicana Cockerell, 1911
- Nomia nigrociliata Cockerell, 1932
- Nomia nilssoni (Pauly, 1991)
- Nomia nitens Cockerell, 1931
- Nomia nortoni Cresson, 1868
- Nomia omanica (Pauly, 2000)
- Nomia opulenta Smith, 1864
- Nomia oryzae Cockerell, 1929
- Nomia papuana Cockerell, 1929
- Nomia parvula Friese, 1909
- Nomia pavonura Cockerell, 1912
- Nomia penangensis Cockerell, 1920
- Nomia perconcinna Cockerell, 1920
- Nomia philippina Vachal, 1897
- Nomia planiventris Friese, 1910
- Nomia postscutellaris Strand, 1914
- Nomia pretoriensis Cockerell, 1947
- Nomia proxima Friese, 1910
- Nomia pulawskii (Pauly, 1997)
- Nomia pulchribalteata Cameron, 1901
- Nomia punctulata Dalla Torre, 1896
- Nomia puttalama Strand, 1913
- Nomia quadridentata Smith, 1875
- Nomia quadrifasciata Ashmead, 1904
- Nomia quadrituberculata (Cameron, 1905)
- Nomia ranavalona (Pauly, 1991)
- Nomia recessa Cockerell, 1919
- Nomia ridleyi Cockerell, 1910
- Nomia robinsoni Cresson, 1865
- Nomia robusta Cameron, 1902
- Nomia rozeni (Pauly, 2000)
- Nomia rubroviridis Cockerell, 1905
- Nomia rufa Friese, 1918
- Nomia rufitarsis Smith, 1875
- Nomia rufocaudata Wu, 1988
- Nomia rufoclypeata Wu, 1983
- Nomia rufosuffusa Cockerell, 1935
- Nomia scitula Bingham, 1903
- Nomia scutellaris Saussure, 1890
- Nomia selangorensis Cockerell, 1920
- Nomia senticosa Vachal, 1897
- Nomia seyrigi Benoist, 1964
- Nomia simplicipes Friese, 1897
- Nomia somalica Friese, 1908
- Nomia spinosipes Cockerell, 1947
- Nomia stageri (Pauly, 2000)
- Nomia starkei (Pauly, 2000)
- Nomia strigata (Fabricius, 1793)
- Nomia subpurpurea Cockerell, 1920
- Nomia swainsoniae Cockerell, 1921
- Nomia terminata Smith, 1876
- Nomia tetrazonata Cockerell, 1910
- Nomia theryi Gribodo, 1894
- Nomia thoracica Smith, 1875
- Nomia tibiaplumosa (Pauly, 2000)
- Nomia trichonota Cockerell, 1939
- Nomia universitatis Cockerell, 1908
- Nomia vassei (Pauly, 2000)
- Nomia vespoides Walker, 1871
- Nomia viridicincta Meade-Waldo, 1916
- Nomia viridicinctula Cockerell, 1931
- Nomia viridilimbata Saussure, 1890
- Nomia westwoodi Gribodo, 1894
- Nomia whiteana (Cameron, 1905)
- Nomia yunnanensis Wu, 1983
- Nomia zonaria Walker, 1871
