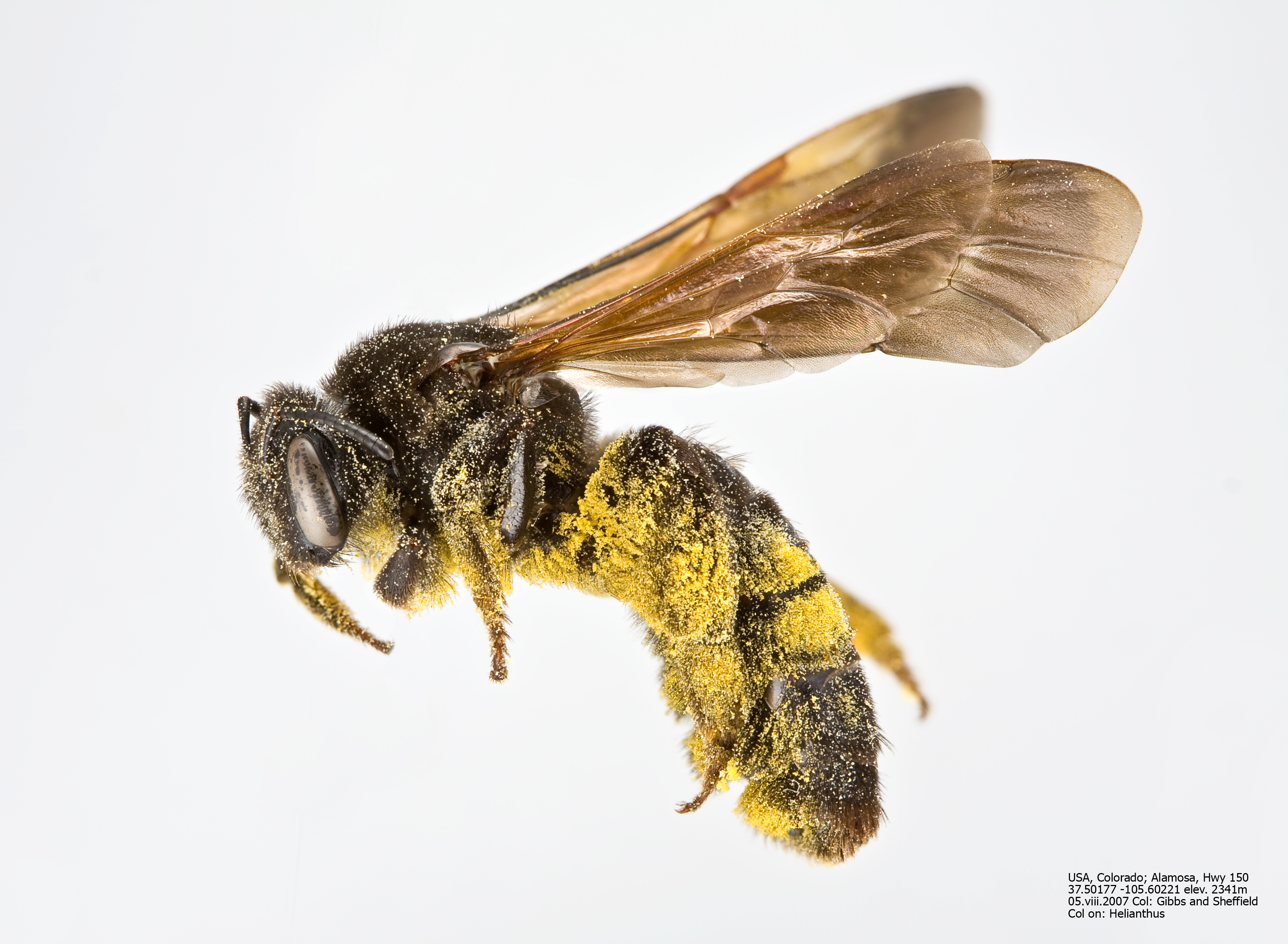
- Dieunomia heteropoda

Scientific classification
- Domain: Eukaryota
- Kingdom: Animalia
- Phylum: Arthropoda
- Class: Insecta
- Order: Hymenoptera
- Family: Halictidae
- Subfamily: Nomiinae

= Nomiinae =

Subfamily of bees

Nomiinae is a subfamily of sweat bees in the family Halictidae. There are about 11 genera and at least 550 described species in Nomiinae.

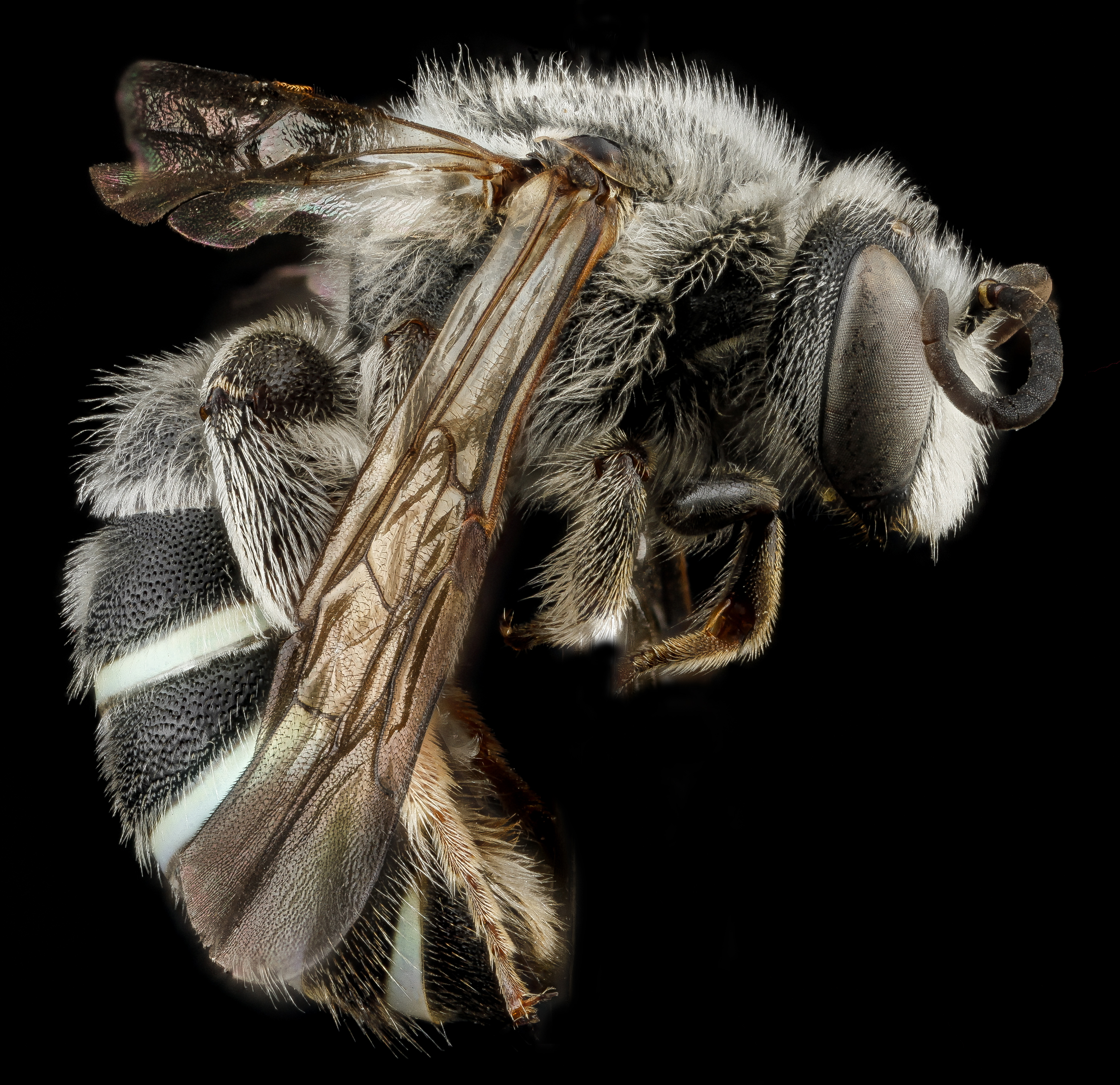
Nomia universitatis

== Genera ==
These 11 genera belong to the subfamily Nomiinae:

- Dieunomia Cockerell, 1899^{i c g b}
- Halictonomia Pauly, 1980^{i c g}
- Lipotriches Gerstäcker, 1858^{i c g}
- Mellitidia Guérin-Méneville, 1838^{i c g}
- Nomia Latreille, 1804^{i c g b}
- Pseudapis W. F. Kirby, 1900^{i c g}
- Ptilonomia Michener, 1965^{i c g}
- Reepenia Friese, 1909^{i c g}
- Spatunomia Pauly, 1980^{i c g}
- Sphegocephala Saussure, 1890^{i c g}
- Steganomus Ritsema, 1873^{i c g}

Data sources: i = ITIS, c = Catalogue of Life, g = GBIF, b = Bugguide.net
