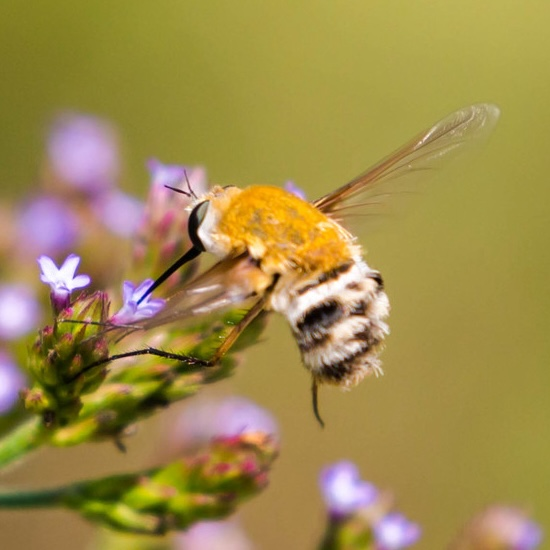

Scientific classification
- Kingdom: Animalia
- Phylum: Arthropoda
- Clade: Pancrustacea
- Class: Insecta
- Order: Diptera
- Family: Bombyliidae
- Tribe: Bombyliini
- Genus: Heterostylum
- Species: H. robustum

Binomial name
- Heterostylum robustum (Osten Sacken, 1877)

Synonyms
- Comastes robustus Osten Sacken, 1877

= Heterostylum robustum =

Species of fly

Heterostylum robustum, the bomber fly, s a species of bee fly belonging to the Bombyliidae family. It is found in southwestern Canada, most of the western United States, and Mexico. It is a bomber fly, parasitizing bees and wasps by launching its eggs into their nests. It is the principal parasite of the alkali bee Nomia melanderi, an important alfalfa pollinator across Washington, Oregon, Idaho, and Wyoming. Other hosts of the fly include solitary bees such as Nomia nevadensis bakeri, Dieunomia triangulifera, Calliopsis anthidia, Nomia scutellaris, and Halictus rubicundus.

== Life cycle and morphology ==
=== Eggs ===
The eggs of H. robustum are 1.2 mm long, 0.7 mm wide, oval-shaped, and tapered on each end. They have a coating of mucus to which soil particles adhere. In the laboratory, the eggs take between about 8 and 11 days to incubate. Like the eggs of ground-nesting bees, they are laid by adults emerging in spring before the beginning of winter.

=== Larvae ===
The development of the larvae of H. robustum proceeds through four moults. First stage larvae are nearly-white planidia, very active and about 1.6 mm long. They have three pairs of thoracic bristles, one long pair of caudal bristles, and eight pairs of smaller bristles on the head and neck. They move by grabbing the surface with their mouth hooks and pushing themselves forward using their posterior prolegs. After the first stage they very quickly pass through an inactive second stage and spend a longer time in a soft, helpless third stage until they reach the fourth stage, in which they begin parasitizing the host. As of 1973 it was unknown what they eat in the first three stages before parasitization.

When they begin parasitizing the host, they firmly press their mouths to the host larvae, attach themselves with the maxillae, and penetrate the host's flesh with their minute mouth hooks. Disturbed fourth-stage larvae that have begun feeding will let go if disturbed, but will then immediately reattach themselves or find a new host if necessary; several larvae placed together cannibalize each other. These larvae are much more active than many other parasitic larvae. Larvae in the fourth stage feed for 3 or 4 days and grow to about twice their former size. In some areas (in the Utah area, but not in Oregon) after consuming the first host the larvae will leave the burrow and burrow through the soil until it finds another prepupal bee to parasitize, of which it consumes about half.

H. robustum larvae overwinter underground like bee larvae; they dig upwards, usually from about 5-10 inches below-ground up to 2-3 inches below-ground. They then dig large, oval-shaped spaces in which to spend the winter. Their burrowing is done by gyrating their abdomens to pack dirt behind them, and then gyrating their anterior ends to loosen dirt ahead and above them.

=== Adults ===
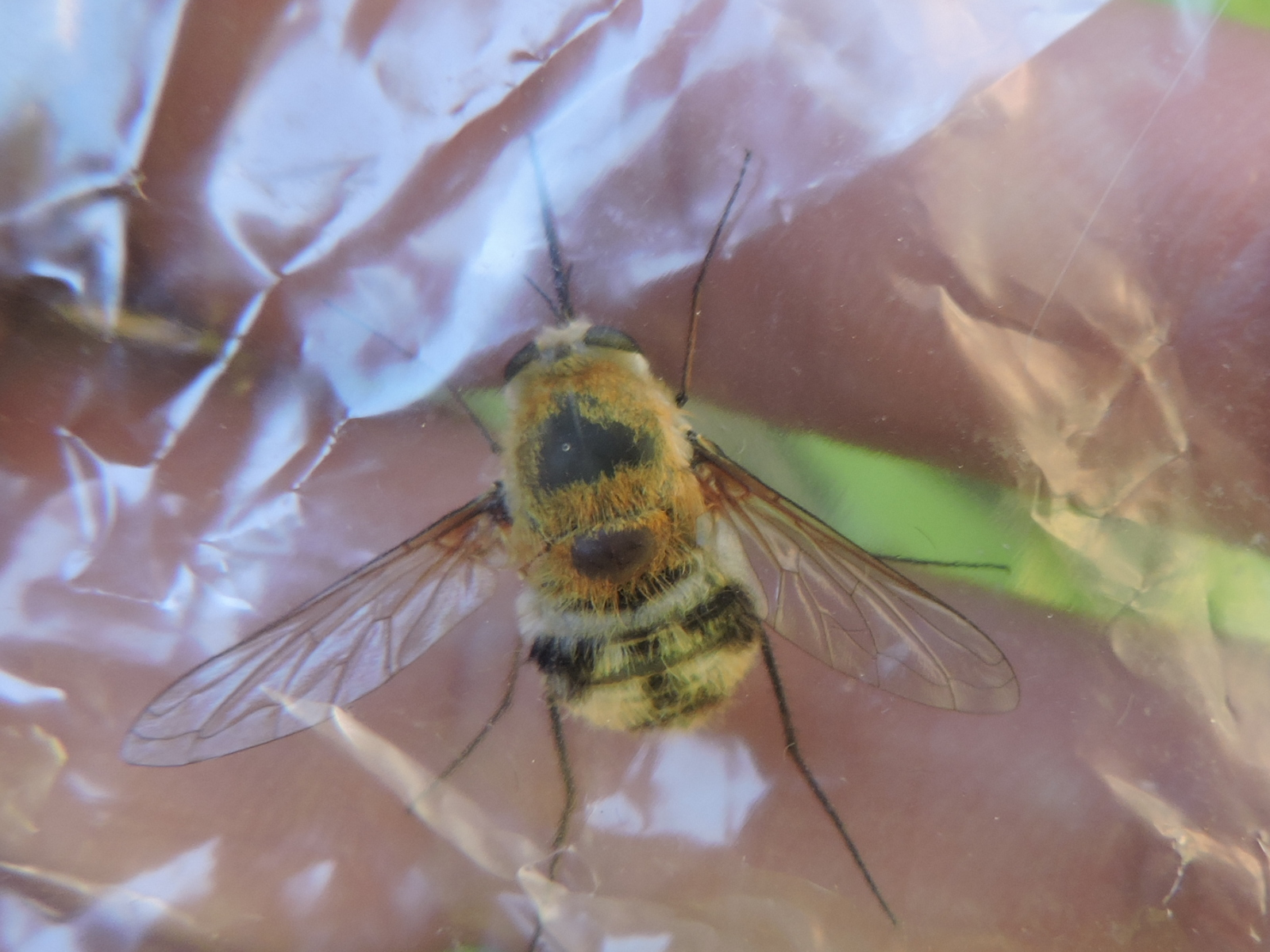
Adult Heterostylum robustum

The adult bee flies begin to emerge in the spring about 10 days earlier than bees, and their period overlaps with bees by several weeks. They dig to the surface and then immediately break out of the pupal skin, which usually remains stuck to the ground and can sometimes be used to identify the presence of the parasites. They then crawl to a nearby object and wait for about 10 minutes for their wings to dry. During this period they are particularly vulnerable to predators, including many birds. Once they are able to fly, the adults seek nectar and mate before beginning to lay eggs about two days later. Unlike some other bee flies, H. robustum do not touch the ground while they do this.

Adults have unclouded wings, a tan thorax, and a gray and buff pattern on the abdomen, as well as a long proboscis. Older flies lose the majority of the hair on their abdomen and become uniformly dark gray. Males and females are similar except that males are holoptic and females are dichoptic.

== Agricultural importance ==
H. robustum is the principal parasite of the alkali bee Nomia melanderi, an important alfalfa pollinator (as of 1960) across Washington, Oregon, Idaho, and Wyoming, and can destroy large percentages of its larvae. The percentage destroyed varies by region from over 90% in Cache Valley, Utah to less than 5% in some areas near Wapato, Washington, but in general is often between 20% and 40% in many areas. In some areas formerly abundant with alkali bees, populations have been reduced to entirely insignificant levels by the parasite.

At least two factors contribute to N. melanderi's ability to survive despite the high parasitism: every year some bees nest alone instead of in groups, and some bees always nest and lay eggs late, or even in a small "second generation" of bees which occurs in late August.
