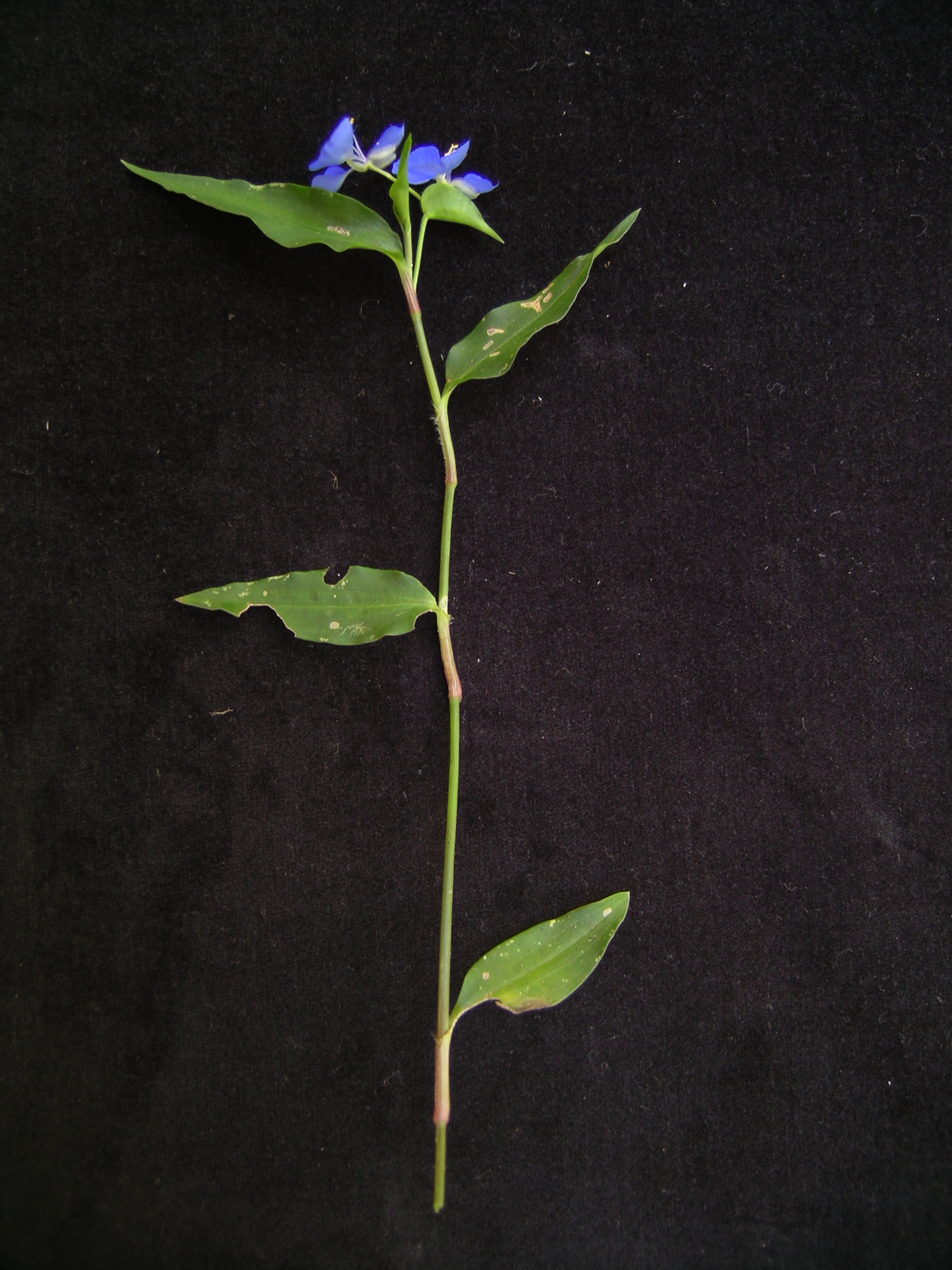
- Stem and flower

Scientific classification
- Kingdom: Plantae
- Clade: Tracheophytes
- Clade: Angiosperms
- Clade: Monocots
- Clade: Commelinids
- Order: Commelinales
- Family: Commelinaceae
- Genus: Commelina
- Species: C. cyanea

Binomial name
- Commelina cyanea R.Br.

Synonyms
- Commelina communis F.Muell.; Commelina cyanea f. albiflora Domin; Commelina cyanea var. verreauxii C.B.Clarke

= Commelina cyanea =

Species of flowering plant

Commelina cyanea, commonly known as scurvy weed, is a perennial prostrate herb of the family Commelinaceae native to moist forests and woodlands of eastern Australia, Lord Howe Island and Norfolk Island. The blue flowers appear over the warmer months and are pollinated by bees and flies.

== Taxonomy ==
Commelina cyanea was one of the many species initially described by the botanist Robert Brown in his 1810 work Prodromus Florae Novae Hollandiae et Insulae Van Diemen and still bears its original name.

=== Etymology ===
The genus name Commelina was chosen based on the Asiatic dayflower. Linnaeus picked the name in honour of the Dutch botanists Jan and Caspar Commelijn, using the two large showy petals of Commelina communis to symbolise them. The specific name is the Latin adjective cyaneus, meaning "blue". As well as scurvy weed, alternative common names include (native) wandering Jew, forget-me-not, and creeping Christian.

== Description ==
Commelina cyanea is a trailing herbaceous perennial plant, whose stems grow along the ground. It readily roots at the nodes when they come into contact with the soil. They die off in winter. The leaves are ovate to narrow-ovate, and measure 2–7 cm (0.8–2.8 in) long by 5–15 mm (0.2–0.6 in) wide. The flowers can occur at any time from spring to autumn. They are deep blue and about 15 mm (0.6 in) in diameter, followed by a capsule bearing up to five seeds about 3 mm (0.1 in) long.

== Distribution and habitat ==
The species range is across eastern New South Wales, from Narooma northwards into Queensland, as well as Lord Howe Island. It grows in wetter shaded areas in forest habitats.

== Ecology ==
Commelina cyanea is pollinated by a variety of native bees such as Nomia aurantifer, Amegilla pulchra, halictid and colletid bees, and syrphid flies (genus Syritta). Wallabies and rabbits eat the vegetation. Vegetation is also possibly dispersed by water.

== Uses ==
The leaves were used by early non-indigenous colonists to alleviate scurvy, and hence its common name.

Attractive in flower, Commelina cyanea adapts readily to cultivation and can be grown as a groundcover or in hanging baskets. It is easily propagated from cuttings. It has a superficial resemblance (in morphology only) to the introduced weed wandering Jew (Tradescantia fluminensis), but is readily distinguished from the native by the variegated leaves and the white flowers. It also lacks the hairy leaf sheathes of the native. C. cyanea can itself be weedy in gardens at times.

== Gallery ==
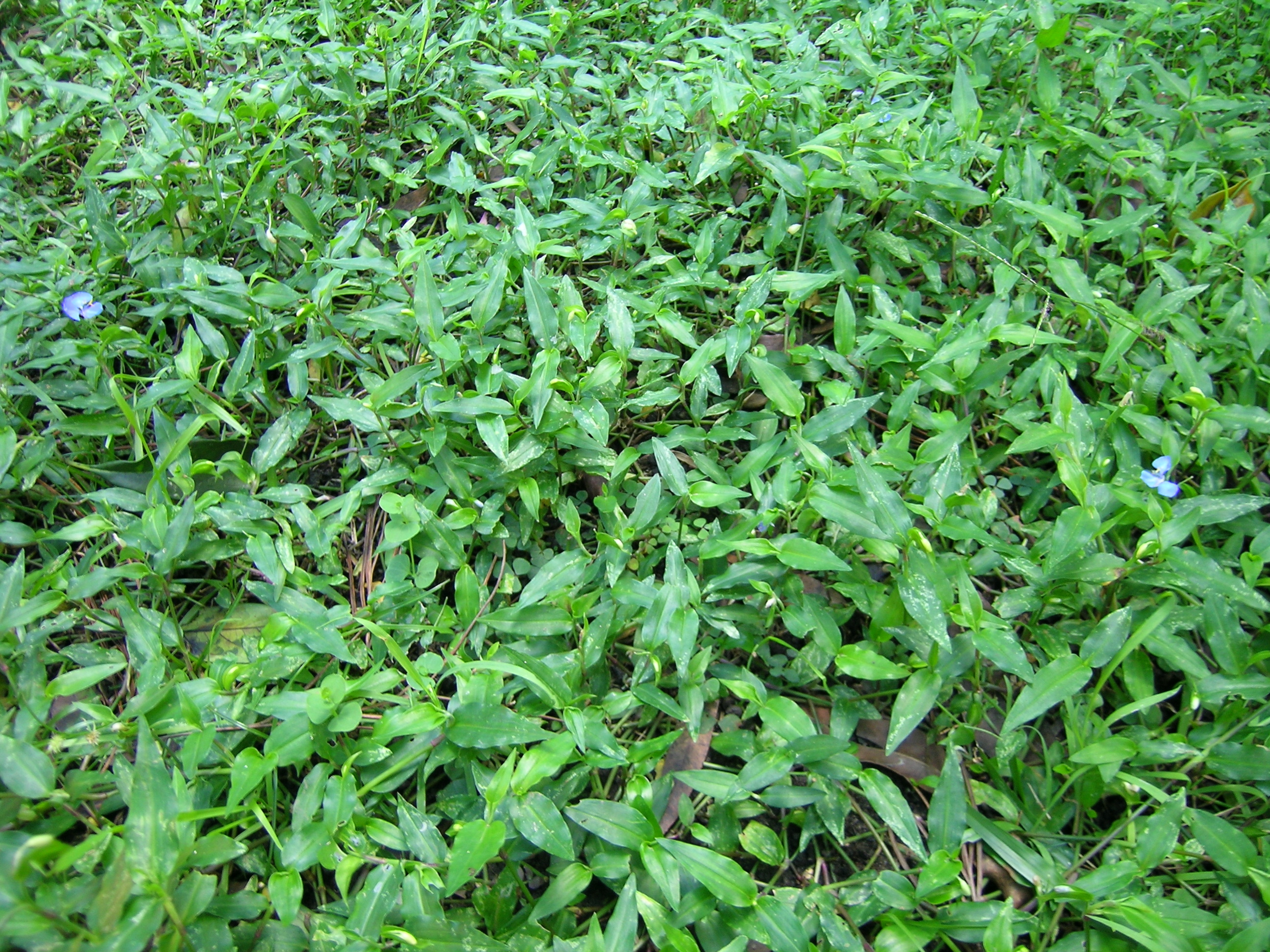
Habit

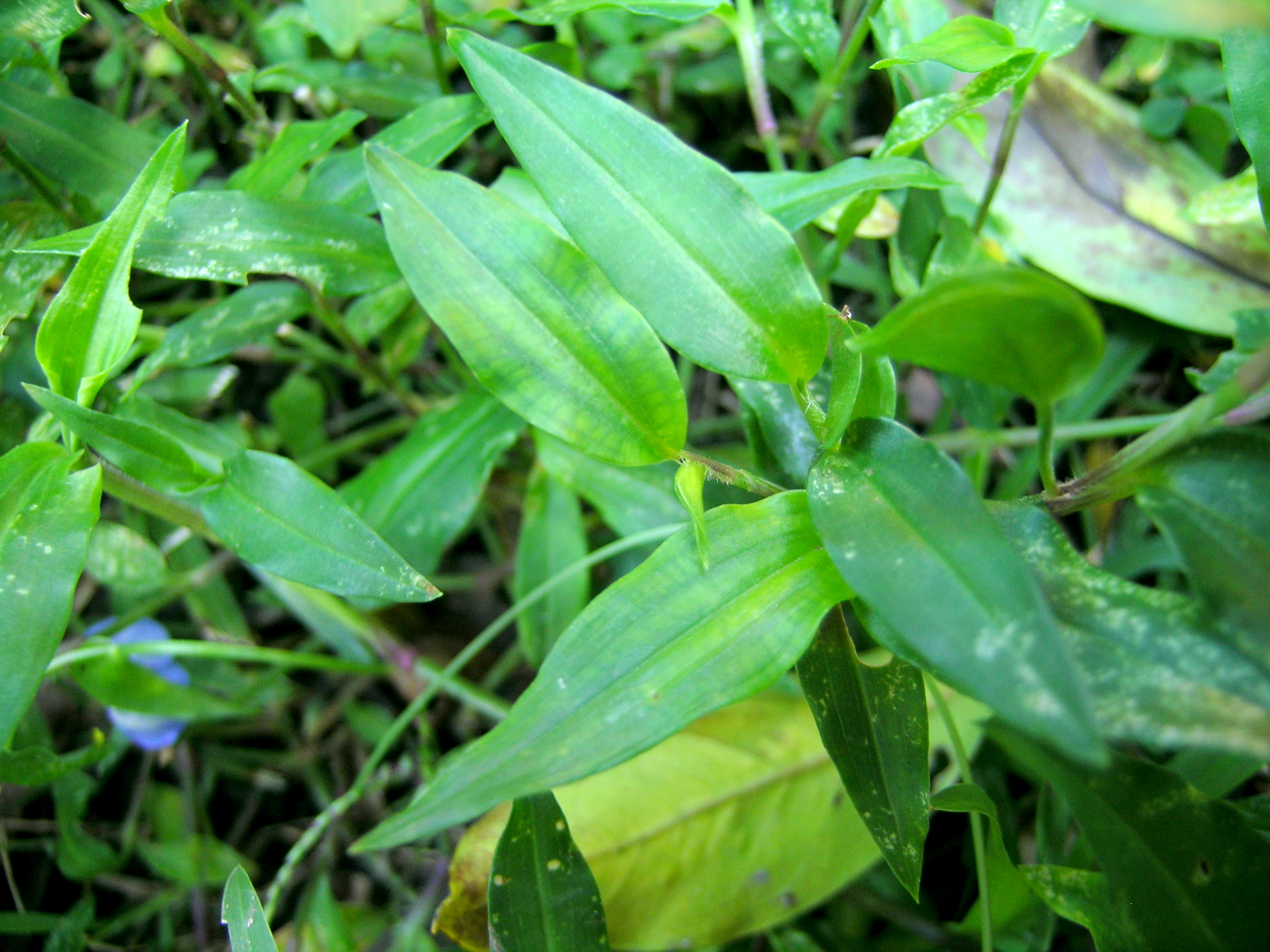
Foliage

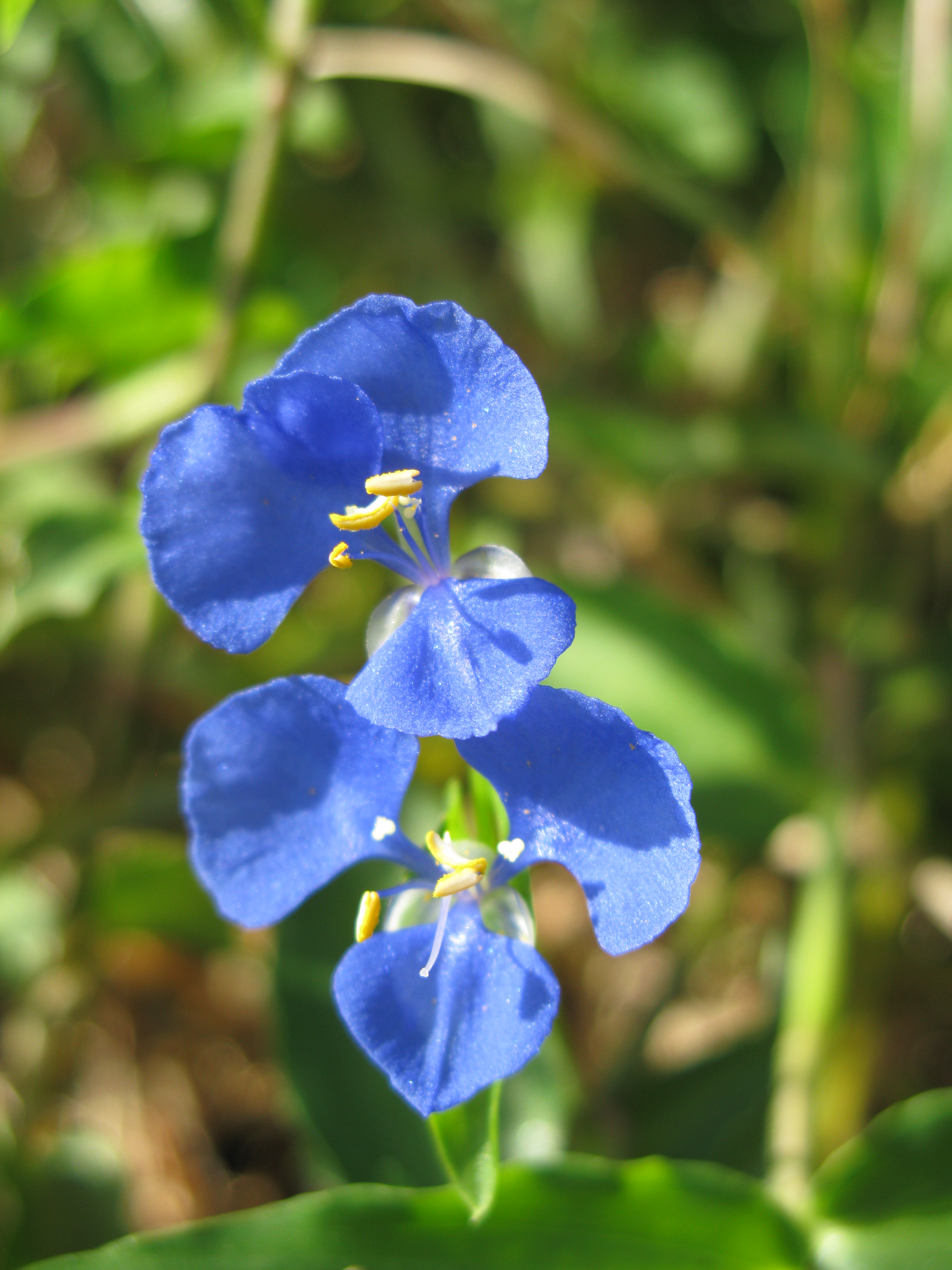
Flowers

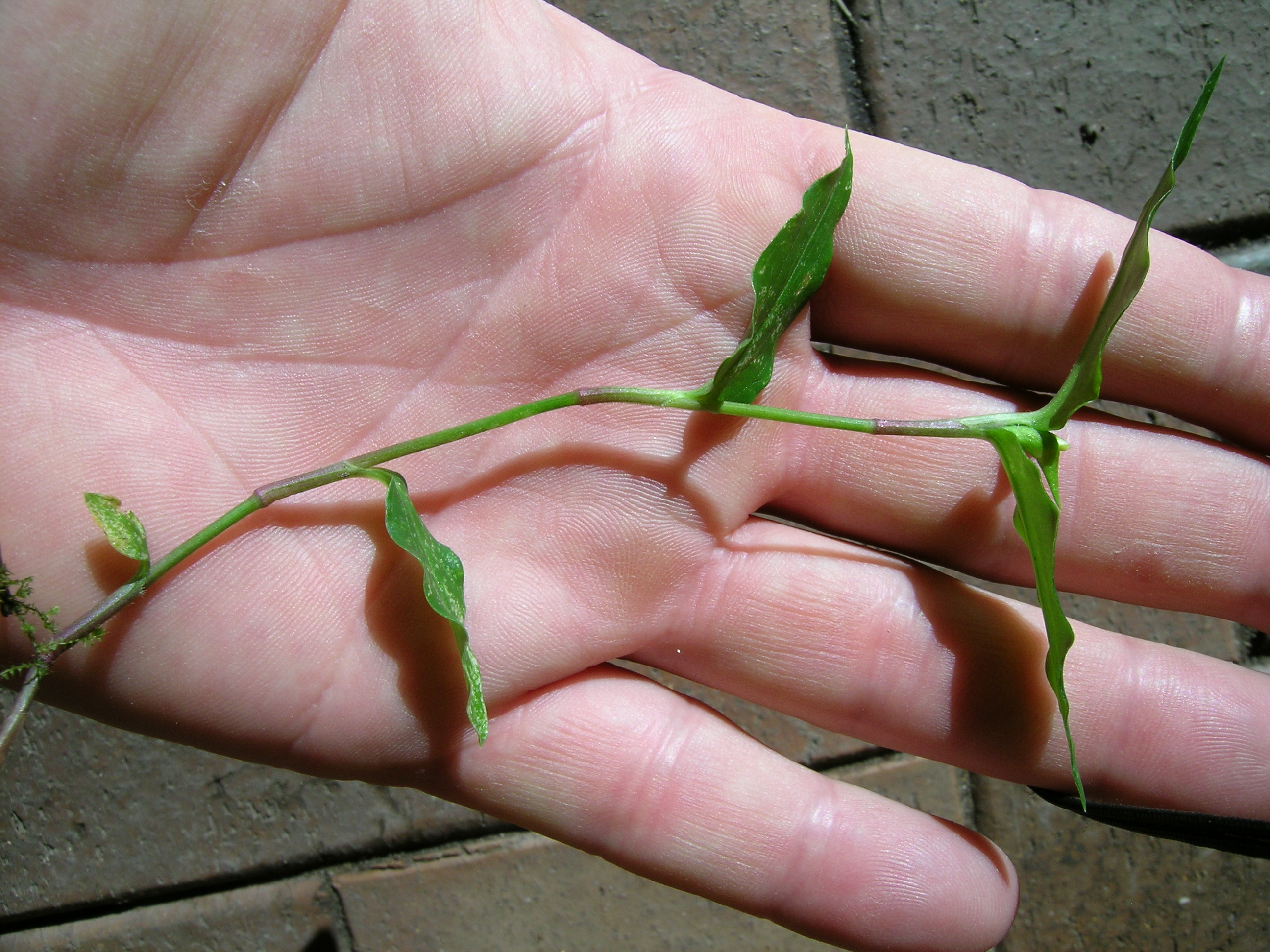
Stem

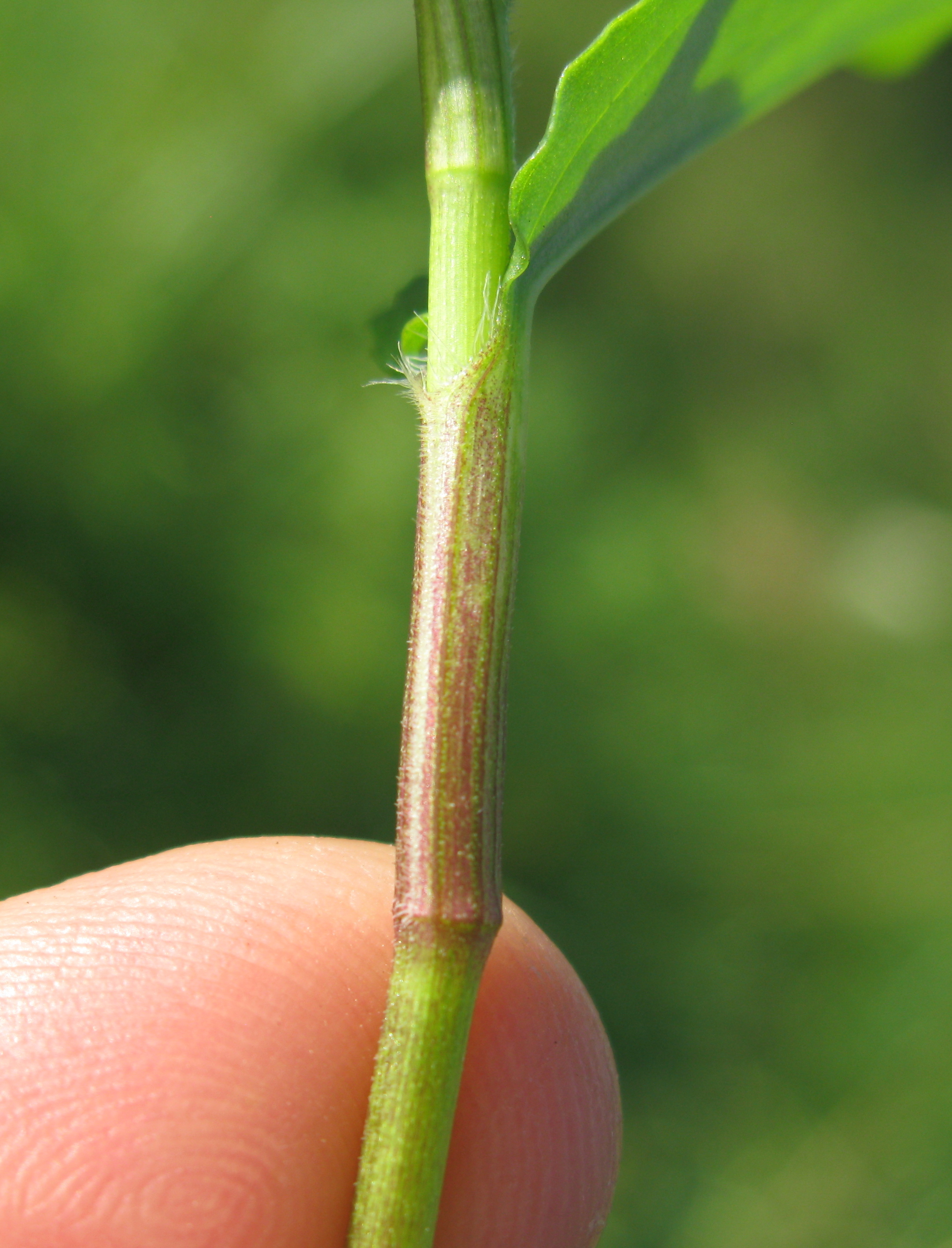
Closeup of leaf sheath

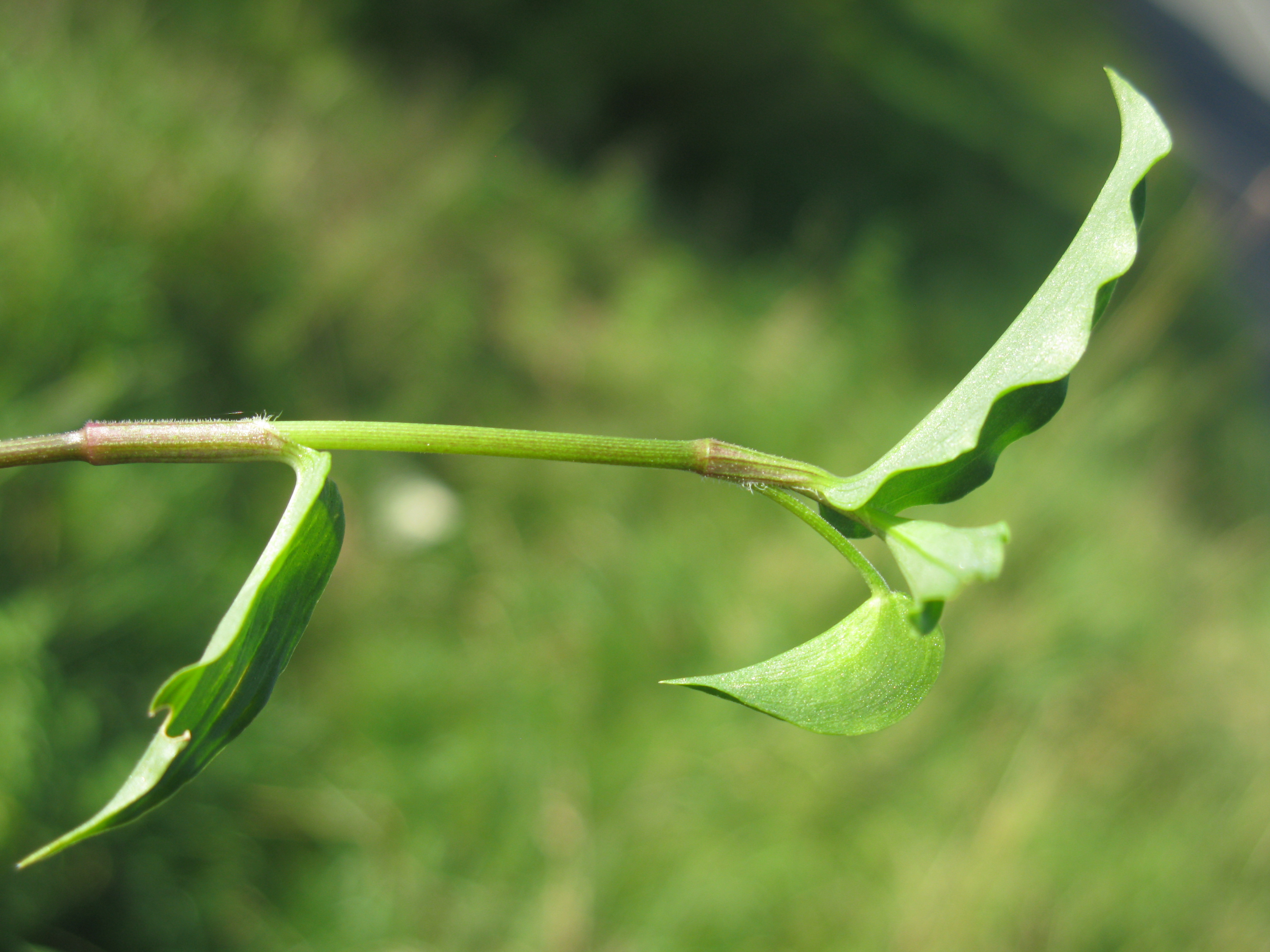
Stem, leaves and cyme
