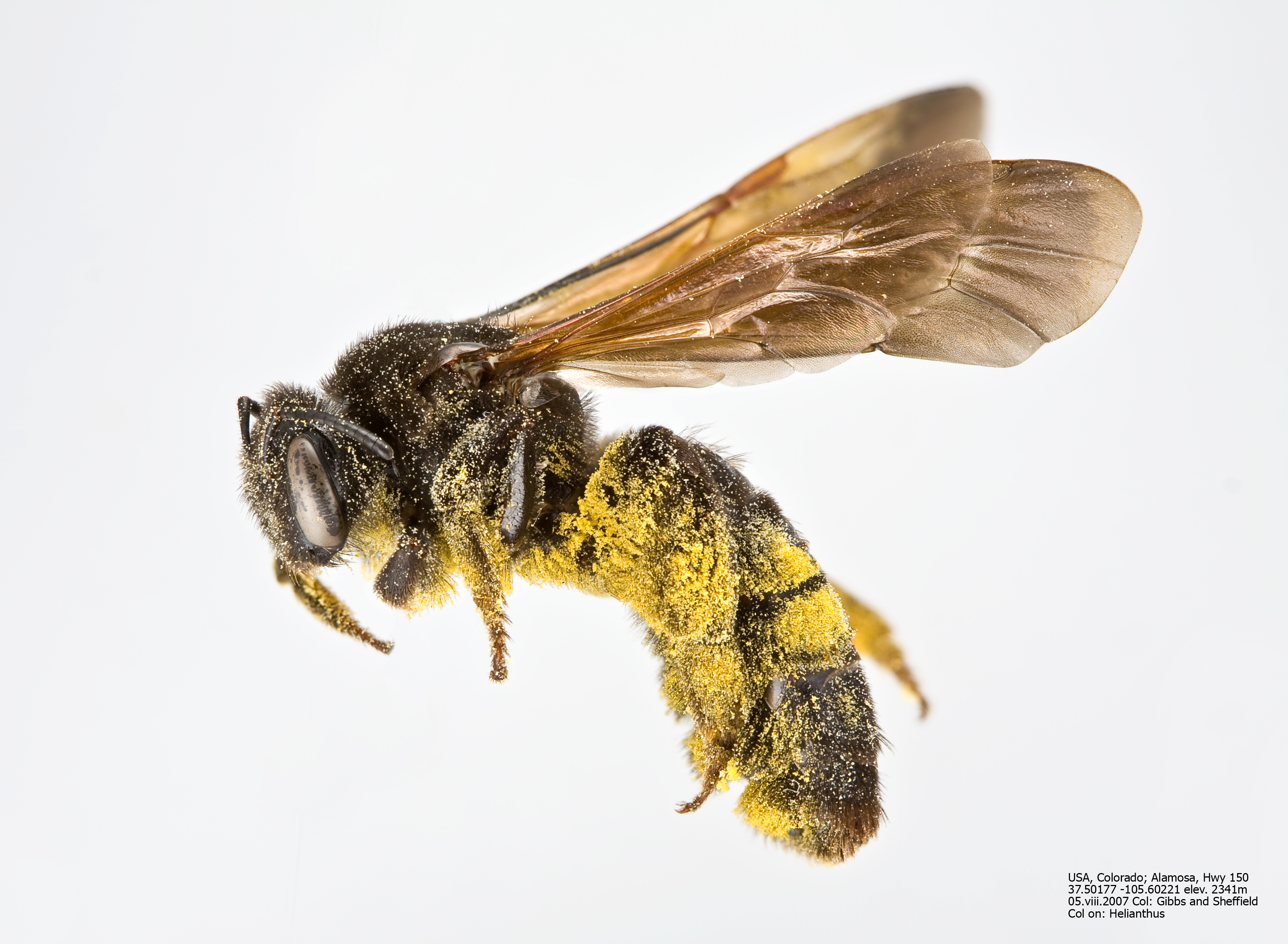
- Dieunomia heteropoda

Scientific classification
- Domain: Eukaryota
- Kingdom: Animalia
- Phylum: Arthropoda
- Class: Insecta
- Order: Hymenoptera
- Family: Halictidae
- Subfamily: Nomiinae
- Genus: Dieunomia; Cockerell, 1899

= Dieunomia =

Genus of bees

Dieunomia is a genus of sweat bees in the family Halictidae. There are about nine described species in Dieunomia. These bees are relatively uncommon, and are larger than almost every other genus in Halictidae other than Nomia. The wing has two submarginal cells, and the usual bent vein of the basal vein is only weakly present. The male has greatly dilated middle tarsi.

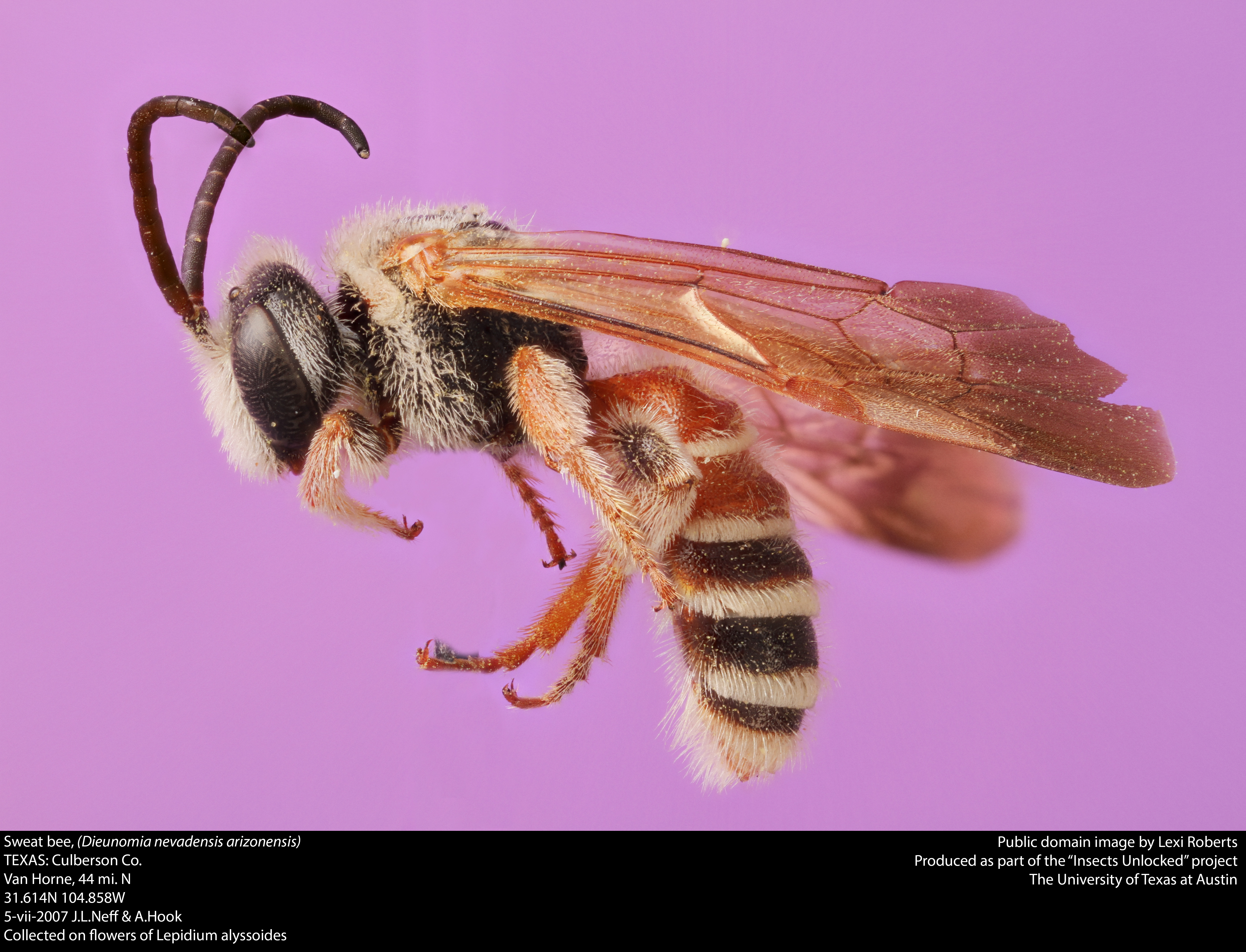
Dieunomia nevadensis

== Species ==
These nine species belong to the genus Dieunomia:

- Dieunomia apacha (Cresson, 1868)
- Dieunomia boharti (Cross, 1958)
- Dieunomia bolliana (Cockerell, 1910)
- Dieunomia heteropoda (Say, 1824)
- Dieunomia mesillae Cockerell, 1899
- Dieunomia micheneri (Cross, 1958)
- Dieunomia nevadensis (Cresson, 1874) (Nevada nomia)
- Dieunomia triangulifera (Vachal, 1897)
- Dieunomia xerophila Cockerell, 1899
