= Dieunomia triangulifera =

Conservation status
- Vulnerable (NatureServe)

Scientific classification
- Domain: Eukaryota
- Kingdom: Animalia
- Phylum: Arthropoda
- Class: Insecta
- Order: Hymenoptera
- Family: Halictidae
- Genus: Dieunomia
- Species: D. triangulifera

Binomial name
- Dieunomia triangulifera (Vachal, 1897)

Synonyms
- Nomia triangulifera Vachal, 1897

Species of bee

Dieunomia triangulifera is a species of sweat bee in the family Halictidae. It is found in the central United States from central Illinois and Minnesota westward to Utah and southern New Mexico. Adult Dieunomia triangulifera closely resemble Dieunomia nevadensis, specifically Dieunomia nevadensis arizonensis.

== Life cycle ==
=== Prepupa ===
In the early stages of its life cycle, Dieunomia triangulifera spends the winter underground as a prepupa in a state of diapause, allowing it to survive harsh conditions. This prepupa can be distinguished from that of Nomia melanderi by sharper dorsal prominences on the thorax, and is butter-yellow with bands of orange between segments.

=== Pupa ===
The insect then begins the process of becoming a pupa. For around two to four days after the termination of diapause it makes occasional tiny flexing movements. It then sheds the prepupal skin, a process that takes from one to six minutes in healthy prepupae. This results in a soft, white, and motionless pupa. This then hardens and pigments over a period of time. It then sheds its skin again, over about 5-10 minutes, to emerge as an adult.

=== Adult ===
The newly emerged adult has soft, white wings and must remain, motionless, in the cell for about 2 days in order for them to harden. Once this is complete the bee tunnels to the surface: males usually leave within an hour, but females wait at least 24 hours before emerging, spending most of this time just below the surface. The males fly low flights just above the surface, seizing the females as they emerge from the ground and attempting to forcibly mate with them: this usually results in the escape of the female, and copulation takes place rarely or never. Actual courtship occurs later.

== Nesting ==
Dieunomia triangulifera often establishes thousands of nests at a site, preferring to nest in knolls or gentle slopes if possible. They can nest in a wide variety of soil types and moistures, including sand, sandy loam, loam, silt loam, and clay loam. Each female of the species constructs her own nest.
