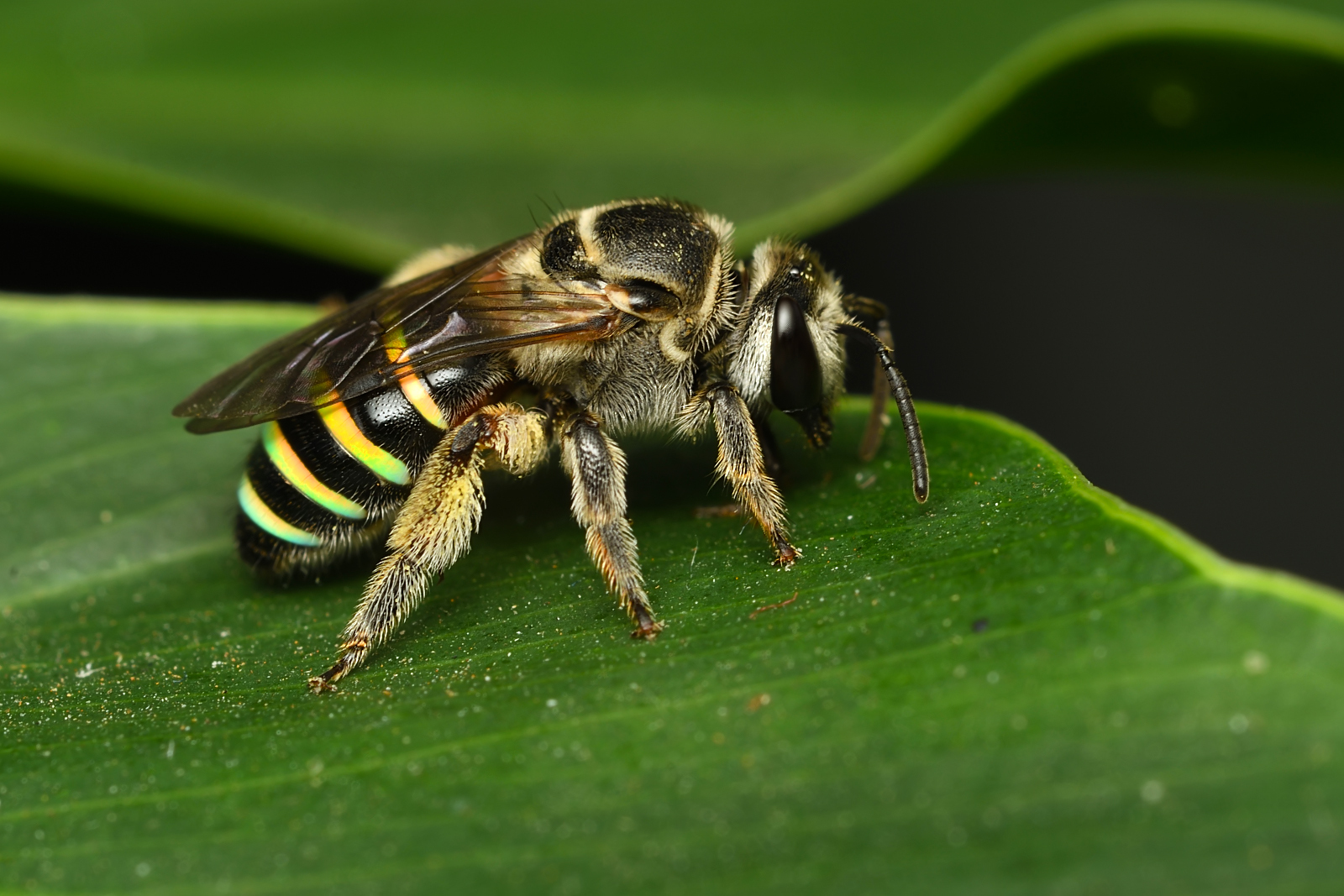

Scientific classification
- Kingdom: Animalia
- Phylum: Arthropoda
- Clade: Pancrustacea
- Class: Insecta
- Order: Hymenoptera
- Family: Halictidae
- Genus: Nomia
- Species: N. westwoodi

Binomial name
- Nomia westwoodi Gribodo, 1894

Synonyms
- Hoplonomia westwoodi (Gribodo, 1894)( Nomia simillima homonym Smith, 1875; Nomia erythrogaster Cameron, 1898

= Nomia westwoodi =

Species of bee

Nomia westwoodi, sometimes known as Nomia (Hoplonomia) westwoodi, is a species of bee in the genus Nomia, of the family Halictidae.
