= Nomia crassipes =

Scientific classification
- Domain: Eukaryota
- Kingdom: Animalia
- Phylum: Arthropoda
- Class: Insecta
- Order: Hymenoptera
- Family: Halictidae
- Genus: Nomia
- Subgenus: Nomia (Nomia)
- Species: N. crassipes

Binomial name
- Nomia crassipes (Fabricius, 1789)

Synonyms
- Eucera crassipes Fabricius; Nomia crassipes (Fabricius)

Species of bee

Nomia crassipes is a species of bee in the genus Nomia, in the family Halictidae. It occurs in Southeast Asia.
