= Nomia formosa =

Scientific classification
- Kingdom: Animalia
- Phylum: Arthropoda
- Class: Insecta
- Order: Hymenoptera
- Family: Halictidae
- Genus: Nomia
- Species: N. formosa

Binomial name
- Nomia formosa (Smith, 1858)

Synonyms
- Curvinomia formosa (Smith 1858)

Species of bee

Nomia formosa is a species of bee in the genus Nomia of the family Halictidae.
