= Nomia aurata =

Conservation status
- Endangered (IUCN 3.1)

Scientific classification
- Domain: Eukaryota
- Kingdom: Animalia
- Phylum: Arthropoda
- Class: Insecta
- Order: Hymenoptera
- Family: Halictidae
- Genus: Nomia
- Subgenus: Nomia (Gnathonomia)
- Species: N. aurata

Binomial name
- Nomia aurata Bingham, 1897

Synonyms
- Nomia nasicana; Nomia crassiuscula; Nomia perconcinna; Gnathonomia nasicana

Species of bee

Nomia aurata is a species of bee in the genus Nomia, in the family Halictidae.
