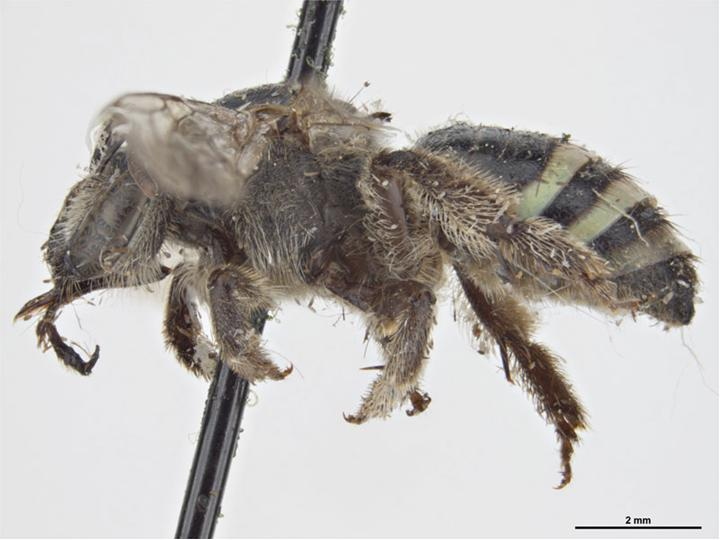
- Female

Scientific classification
- Kingdom: Animalia
- Phylum: Arthropoda
- Class: Insecta
- Order: Hymenoptera
- Family: Halictidae
- Genus: Nomia
- Subgenus: Nomia (Hoplonomia)
- Species: N. lyonsiae

Binomial name
- Nomia lyonsiae Cockerell, 1912

Synonyms
- Hoplonomia lyonsiae (Cockerell, 1912)

= Nomia lyonsiae =

Species of bee

Nomia lyonsiae is a species of bee in the family Halictidae. It occurs in Australia and Polynesia.

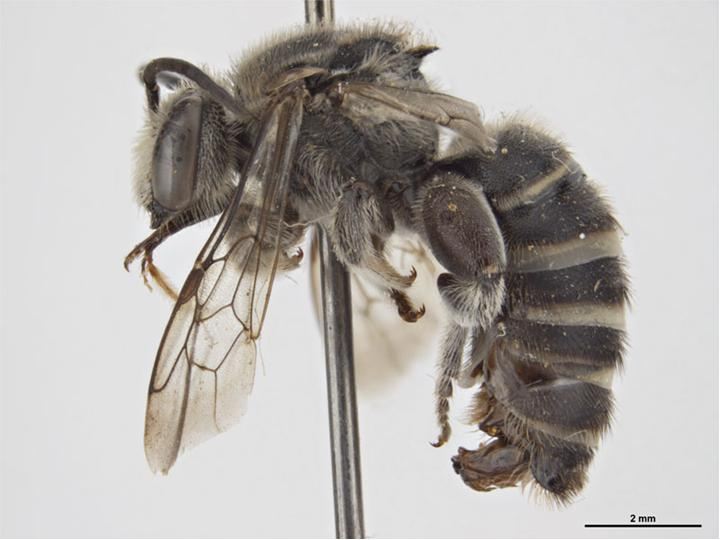
Male
