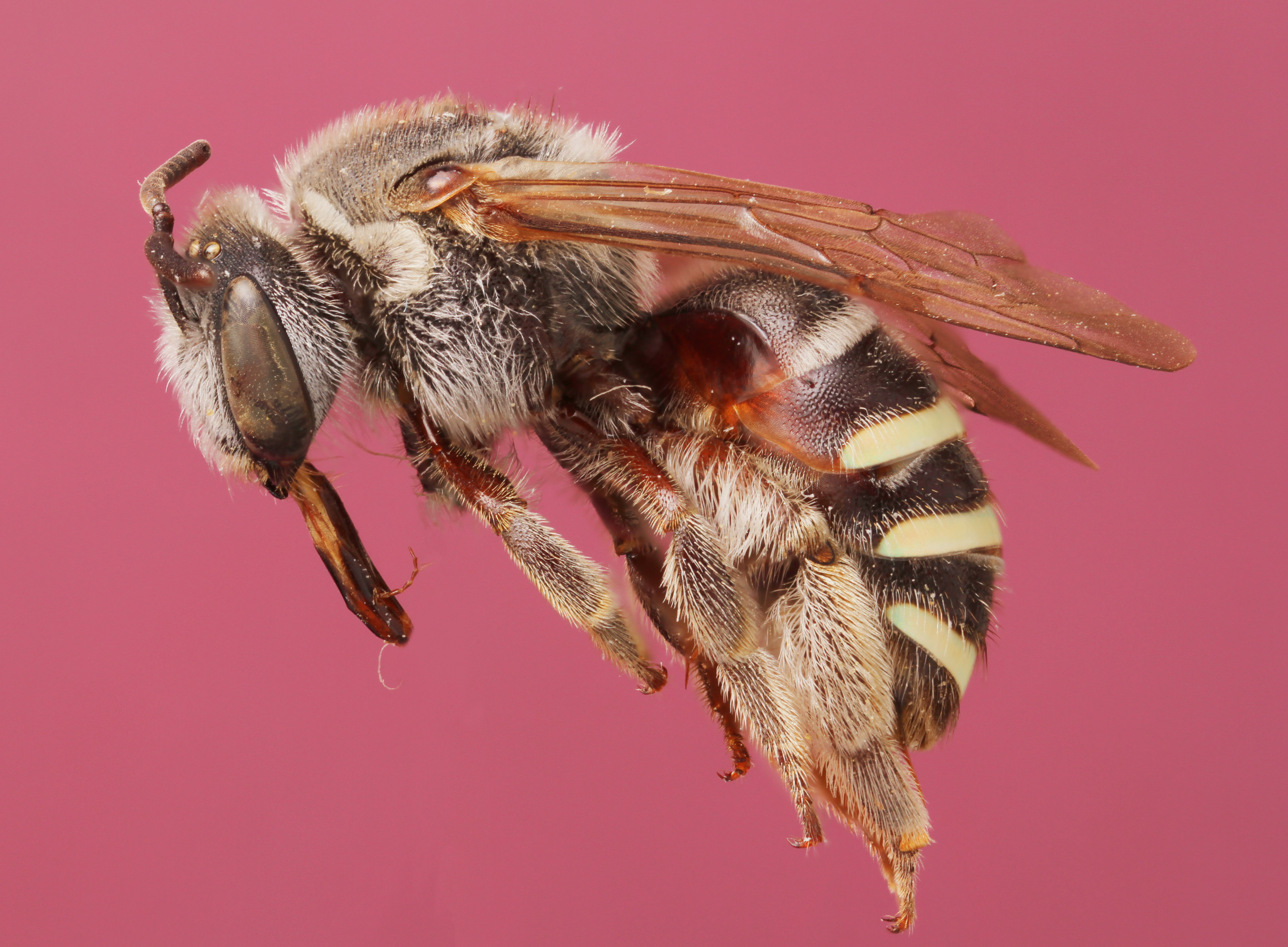

Scientific classification
- Kingdom: Animalia
- Phylum: Arthropoda
- Class: Insecta
- Order: Hymenoptera
- Family: Halictidae
- Genus: Nomia
- Subgenus: Nomia (Acunomia)
- Species: N. tetrazonata

Binomial name
- Nomia tetrazonata Cockerell, 1910

= Nomia tetrazonata =

Species of bee

Nomia tetrazonata is a species of sweat bee in the family Halictidae. It is found in Central America and North America.

== Subspecies ==
There are two subspecies:

- Nomia tetrazonata tetrazonata Cockerell, 1910
- Nomia tetrazonata uvaldensis Cockerell, 1930
