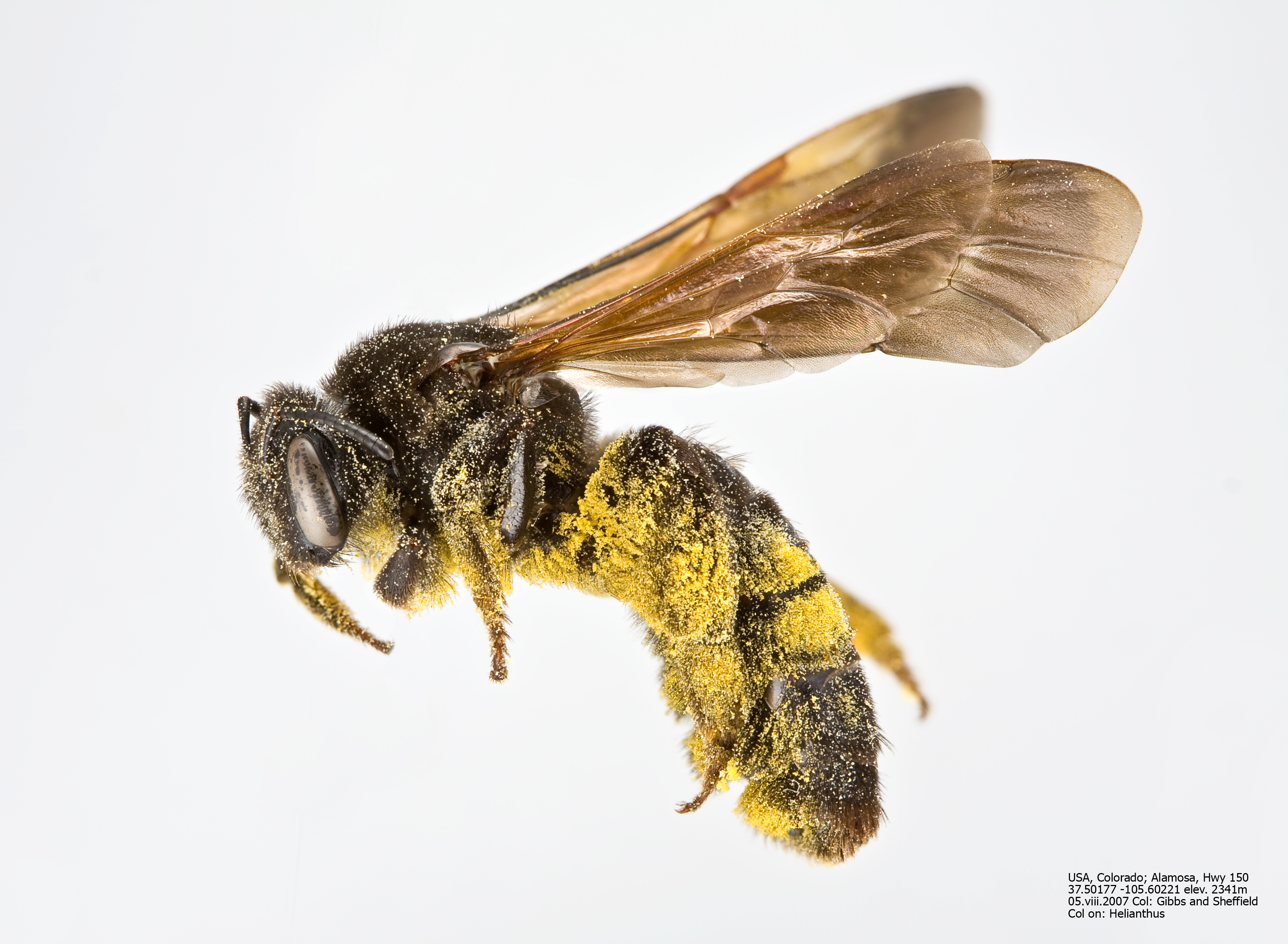

Scientific classification
- Domain: Eukaryota
- Kingdom: Animalia
- Phylum: Arthropoda
- Class: Insecta
- Order: Hymenoptera
- Family: Halictidae
- Genus: Dieunomia
- Species: D. heteropoda

Binomial name
- Dieunomia heteropoda (Say, 1824)

= Dieunomia heteropoda =

Species of bee

Dieunomia heteropoda is a species of sweat bee in the family Halictidae. It is found in Central America and North America.

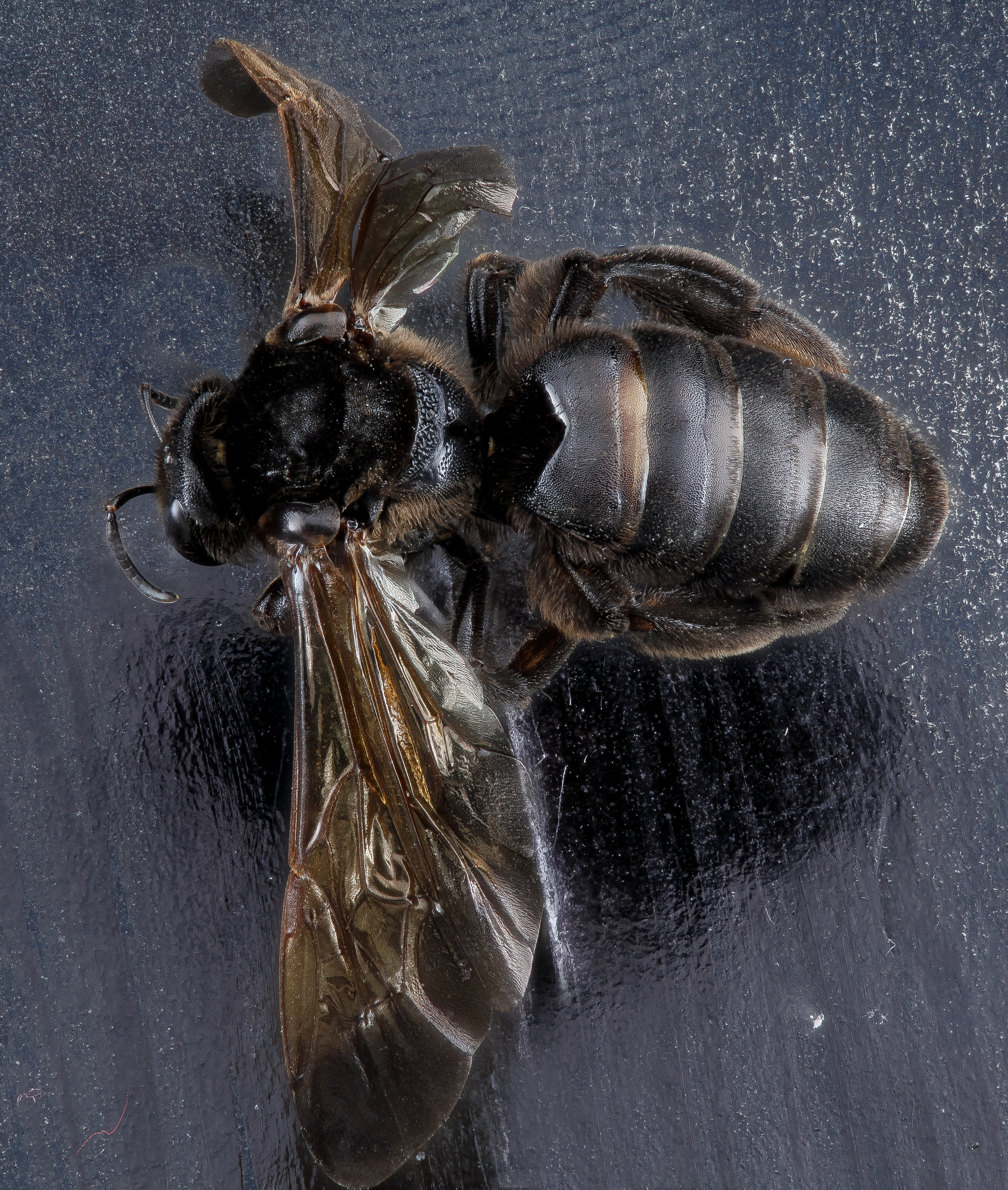

== Subspecies ==
These two subspecies belong to the species Dieunomia heteropoda:

- Dieunomia heteropoda heteropoda (Say, 1824)
- Dieunomia heteropoda kirbii (Smith, 1865)
