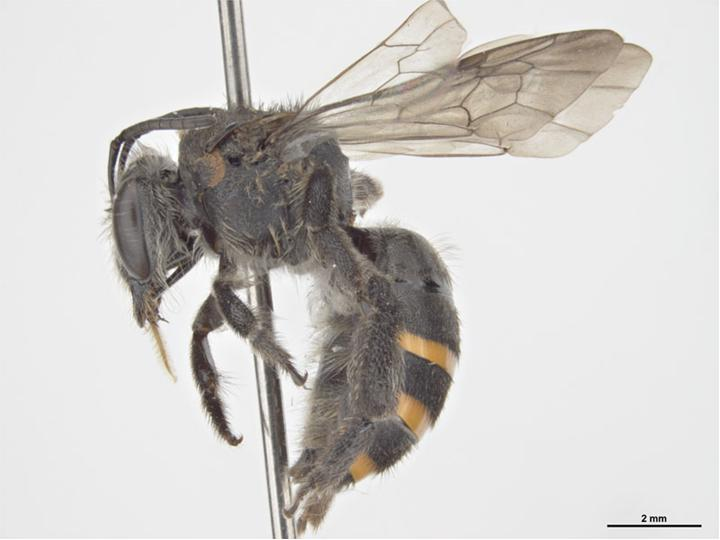
- Female

Scientific classification
- Kingdom: Animalia
- Phylum: Arthropoda
- Class: Insecta
- Order: Hymenoptera
- Family: Halictidae
- Genus: Nomia
- Subgenus: Nomia (Paulynomia)
- Species: N. aurantifer

Binomial name
- Nomia aurantifer Cockerell, 1910

Synonyms
- Nomia luteofasciata Friese, 1917

= Nomia aurantifer =

Species of bee

Nomia aurantifer is a species of bee in the genus Nomia, in the family Halictidae. It occurs in Australia and Southeast Asia.
