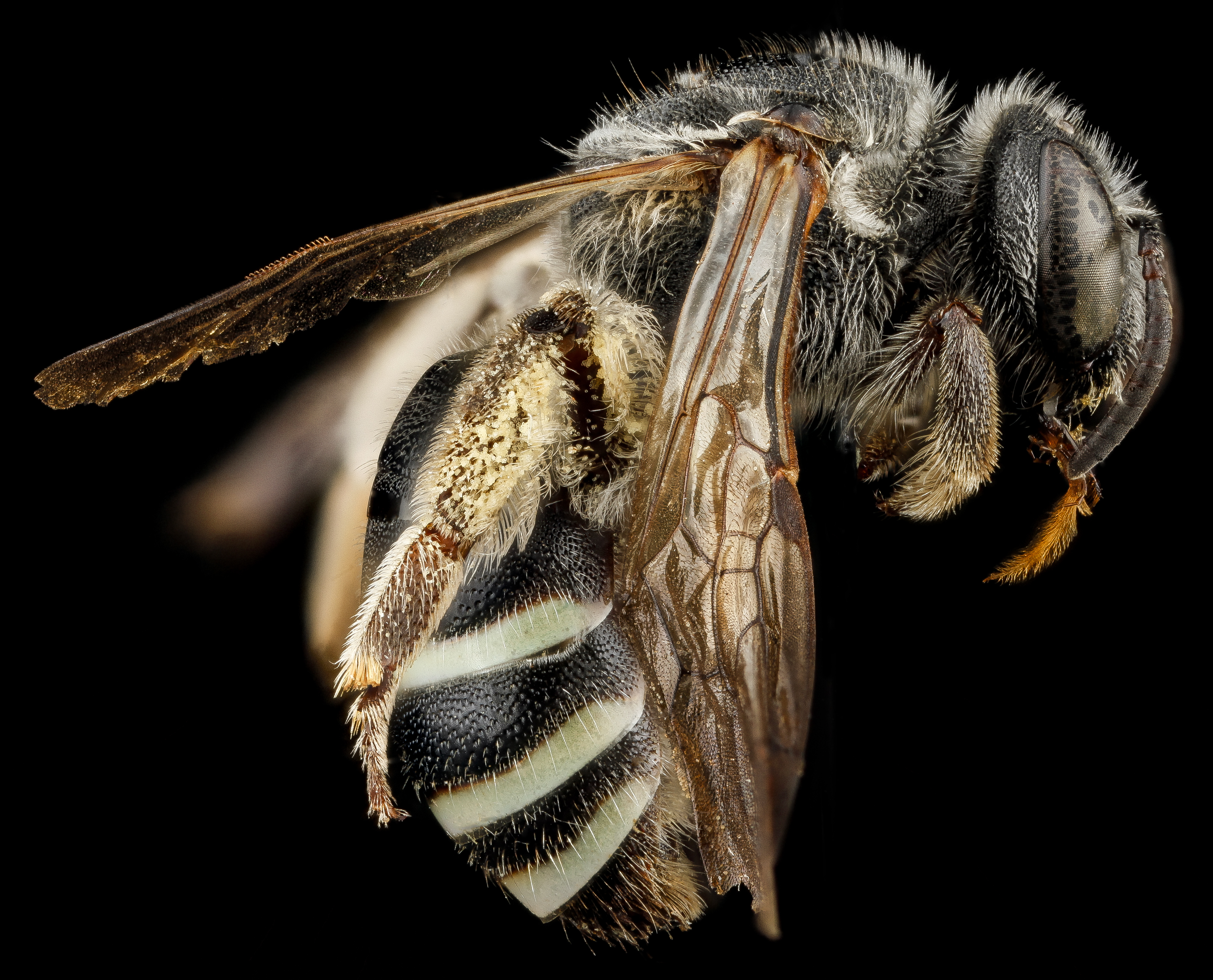
- Female

Conservation status
- Vulnerable (NatureServe)

Scientific classification
- Kingdom: Animalia
- Phylum: Arthropoda
- Class: Insecta
- Order: Hymenoptera
- Family: Halictidae
- Genus: Nomia
- Subgenus: Nomia (Acunomia)
- Species: N. universitatis

Binomial name
- Nomia universitatis Cockerell, 1908

= Nomia universitatis =

Species of bee

Nomia universitatis is a species of bee in the family Halictidae. It is native to the continental United States.

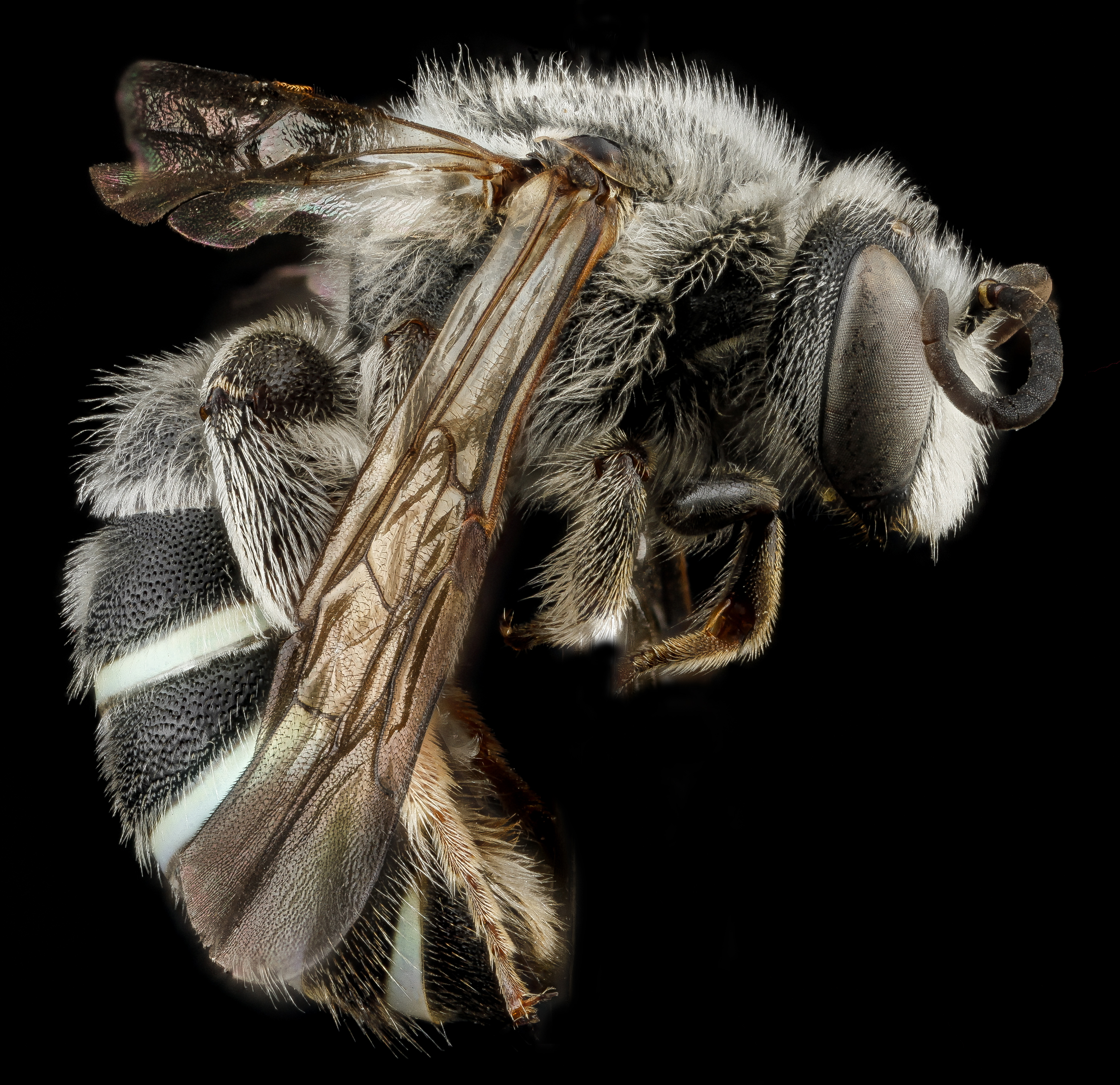
Male

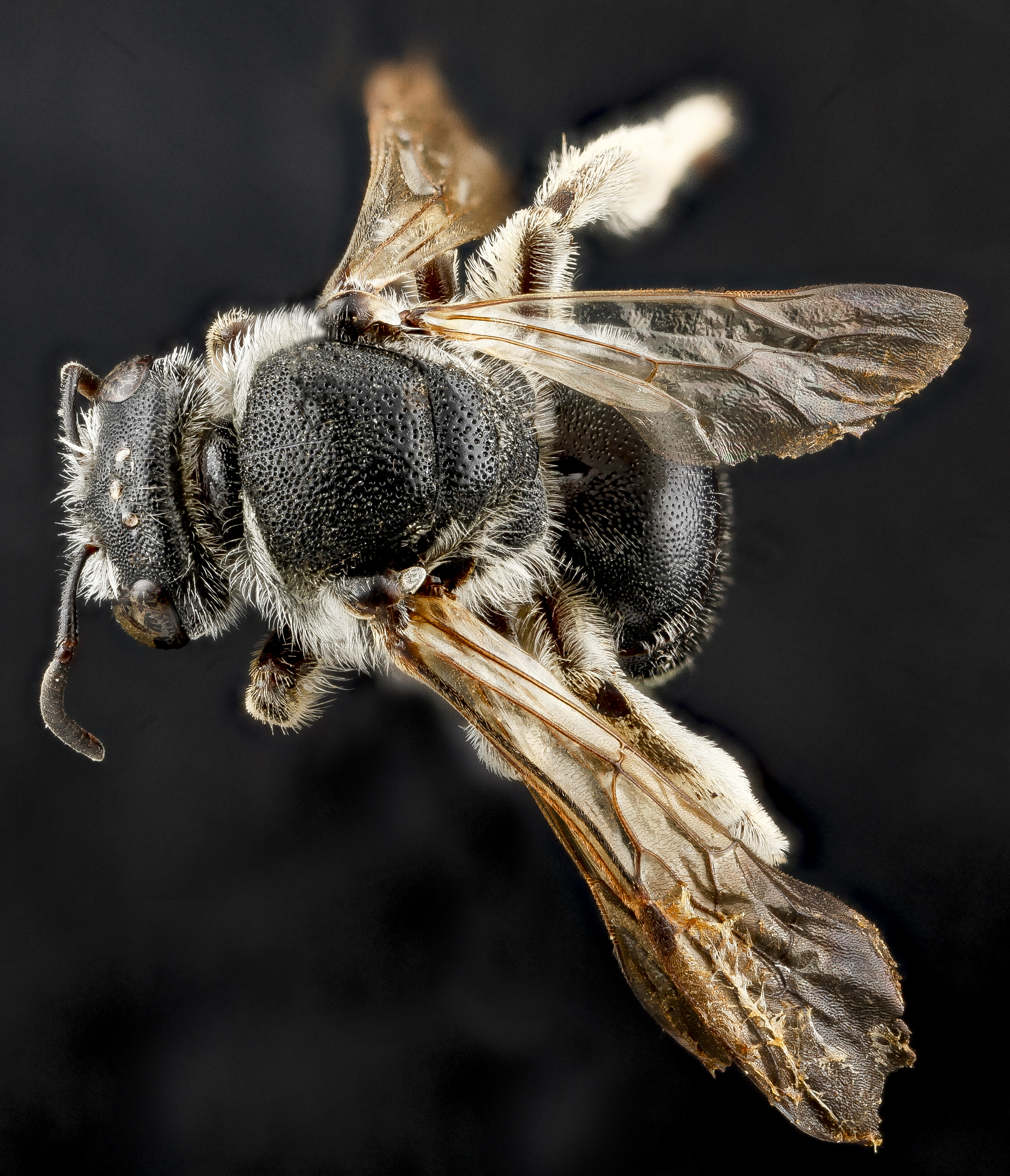
Female, back view

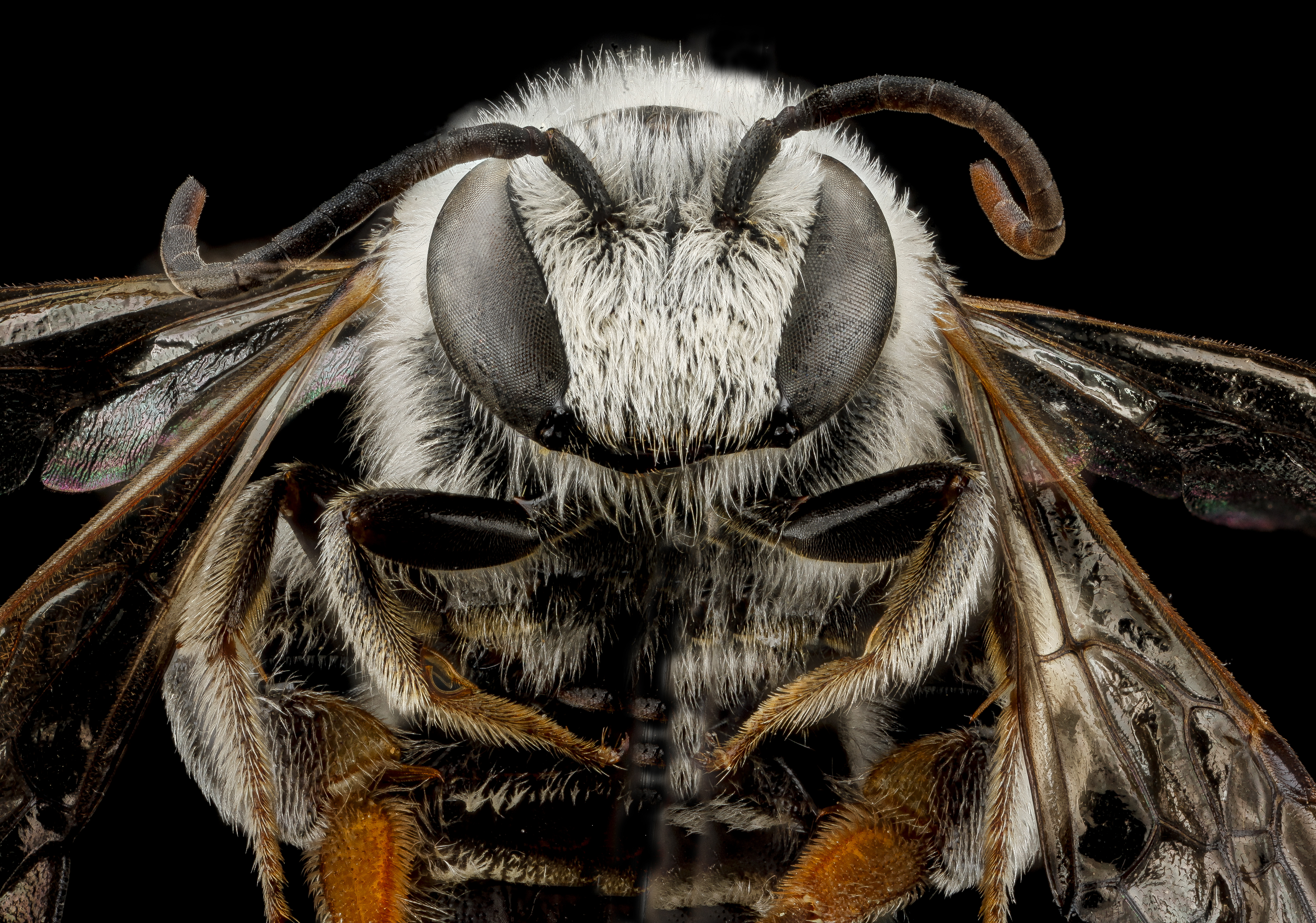
Male, face
