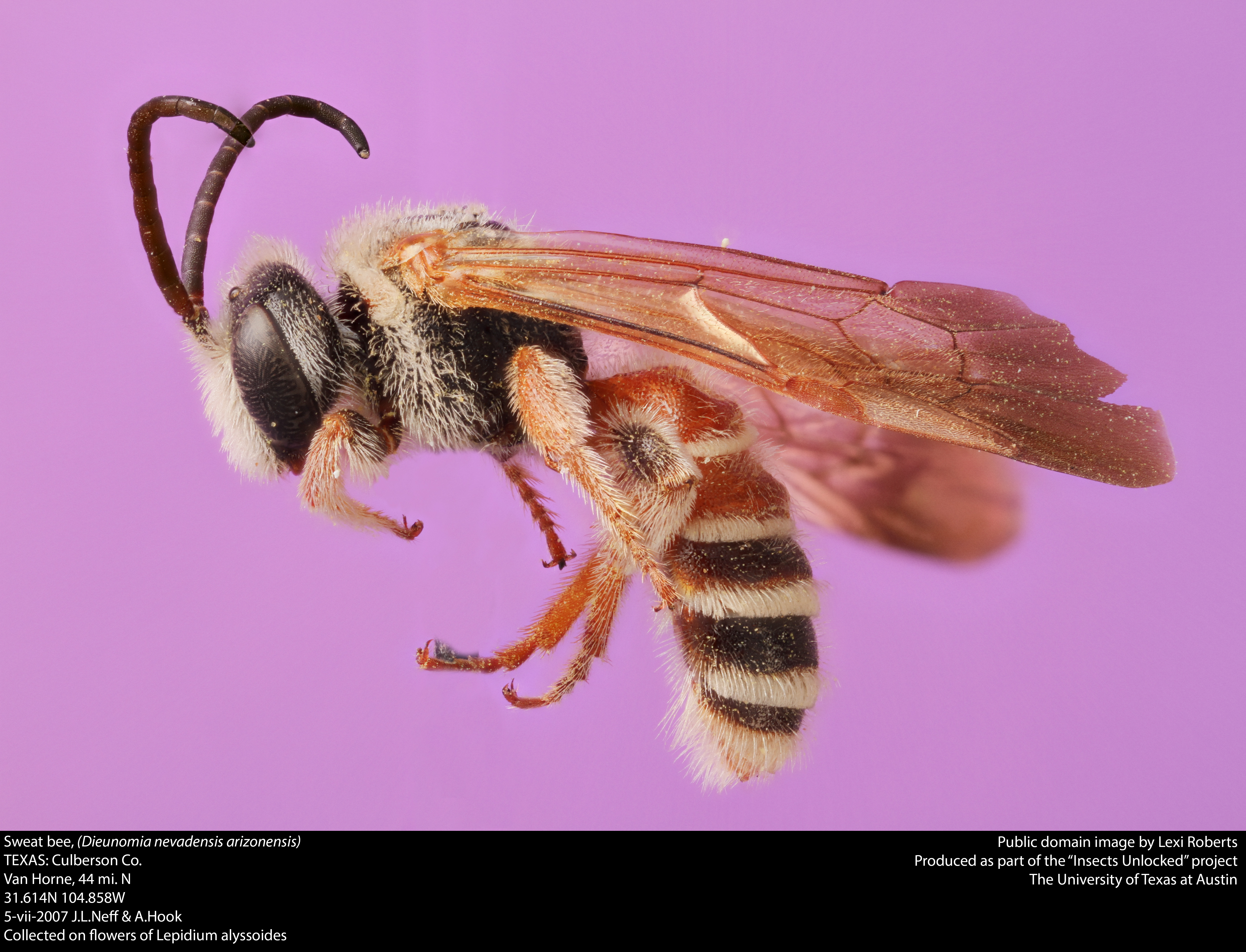

Scientific classification
- Domain: Eukaryota
- Kingdom: Animalia
- Phylum: Arthropoda
- Class: Insecta
- Order: Hymenoptera
- Family: Halictidae
- Genus: Dieunomia
- Species: D. nevadensis

Binomial name
- Dieunomia nevadensis (Cresson, 1874)

Synonyms
- Nomia nevadensis

= Dieunomia nevadensis =

Species of bee

Dieunomia nevadensis, the Nevada nomia, is a species of sweat bee in the family Halictidae. It is found in Central America and North America. It was first described by Ezra Cresson in 1874.

== Subspecies ==
These five subspecies belong to the species Dieunomia nevadensis:

- Dieunomia nevadensis angelesia (Cockerell, 1910)
- Dieunomia nevadensis arizonensis (Cockerell, 1899)
- Dieunomia nevadensis bakeri (Cockerell, 1898)
- Dieunomia nevadensis nevadensis (Cresson, 1874)
- Dieunomia nevadensis stellata (Cross, 1958)

The subspecies Dieunomia nevadensis arizonensis is found in the southwestern and western United States and Mexico, and is easily distinguished by its extensively red abdomen.

=== Dieunomia nevadensis bakeri ===
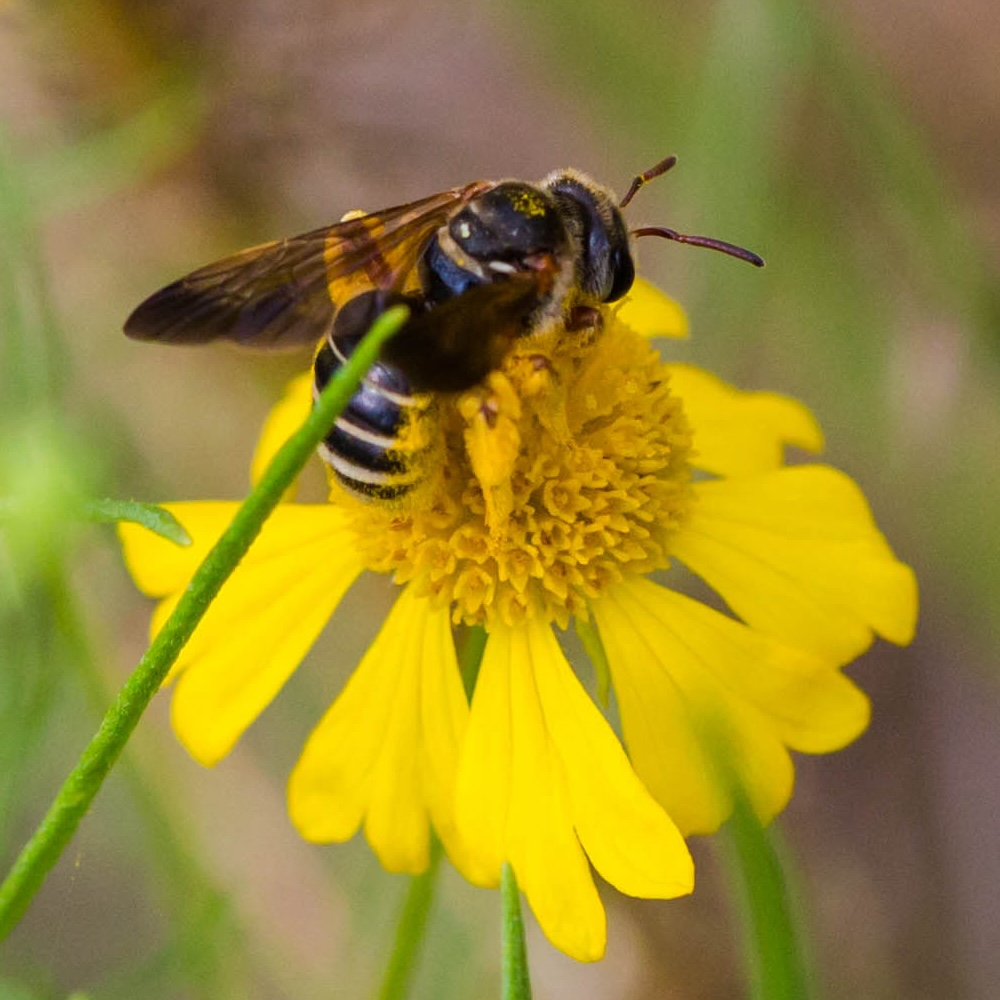
Dieunomia nevadensis ssp. bakeri

Dieunomia nevadensis bakeri, sometimes also called Baker's dieunomia, was first described as its own species by Cockerell in 1898. It was subordinated to Dieunomia nevadensis in 1930 based on genitals which appeared identical with those of Dieunomia nevadensis, despite the different outward appearance. Dieunomia nevadensis bakeri is about 2 mm longer than general Dieunomia nevadensis and is more robust; it has a black instead of yellowish-red abdomen, coarser punctures in the mesothorax, and less red tubercules.

The range of Dieunomia nevadensis bakeri extends eastward up to Texas, Florida, and North Carolina; westward as far as Colorado and Wyoming; and northward as far as Illinois. Its range overlaps to an extent with that of Dieunomia nevadensis arizonensis.

== Gallery ==
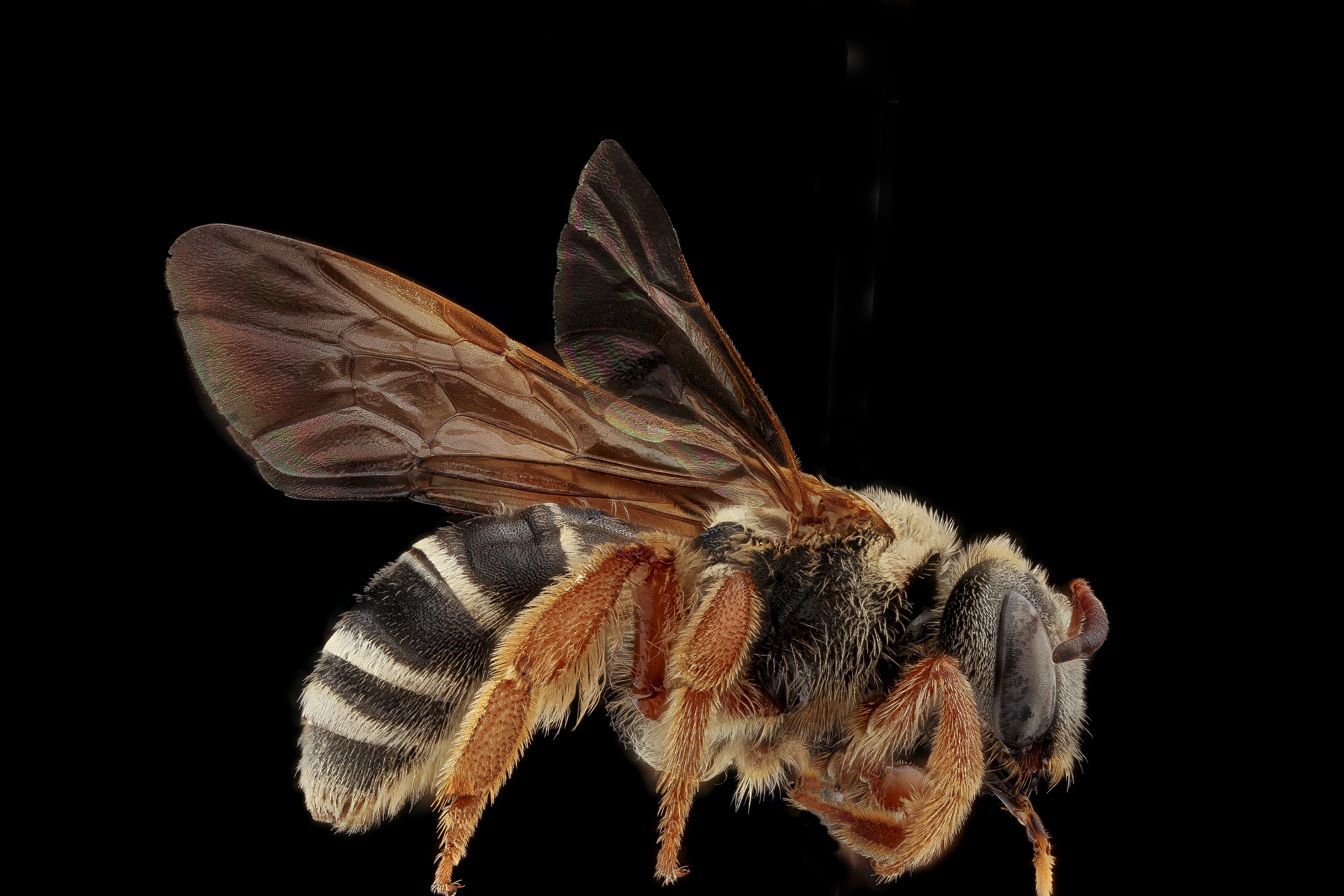
USGS side view

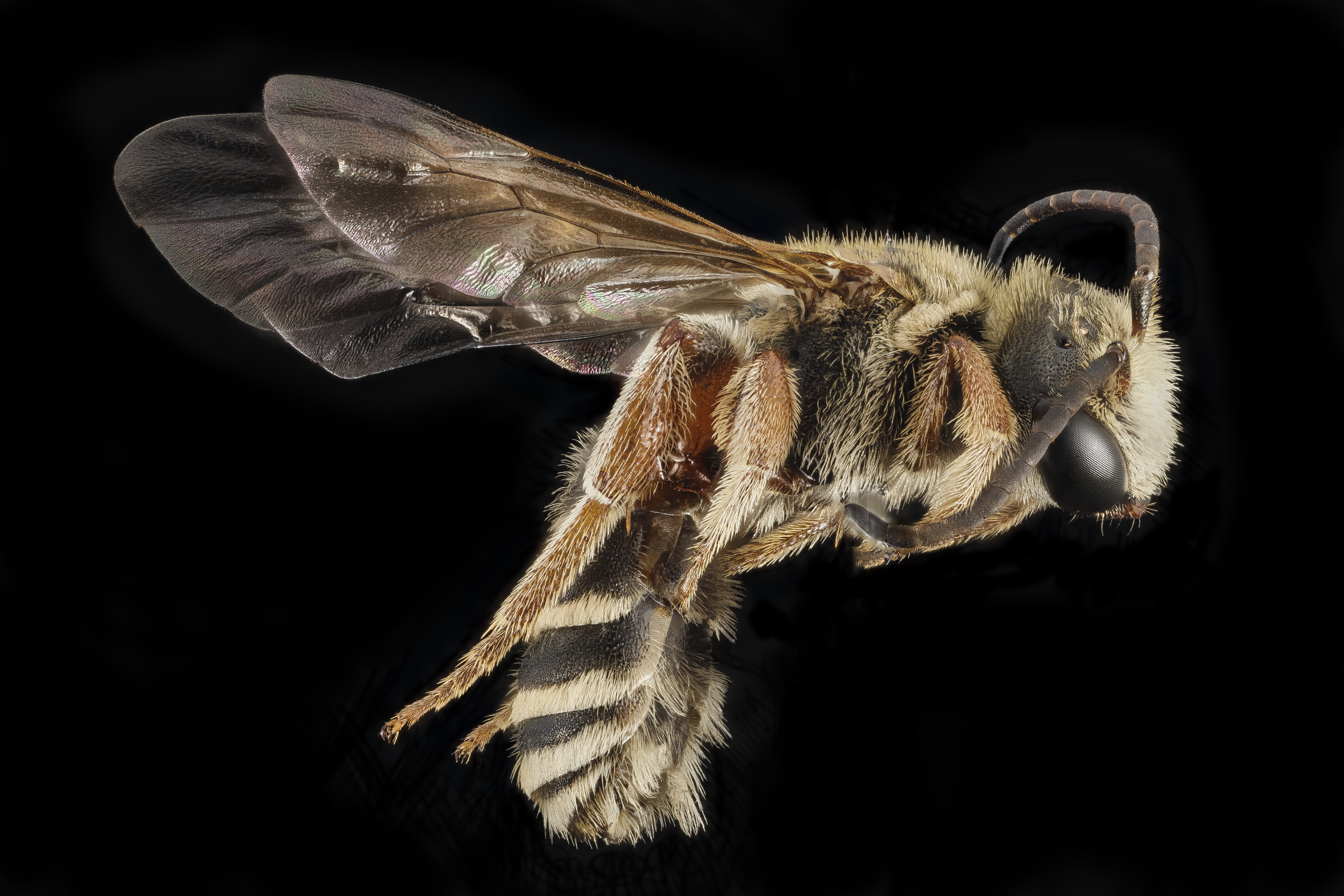
Side view of another example

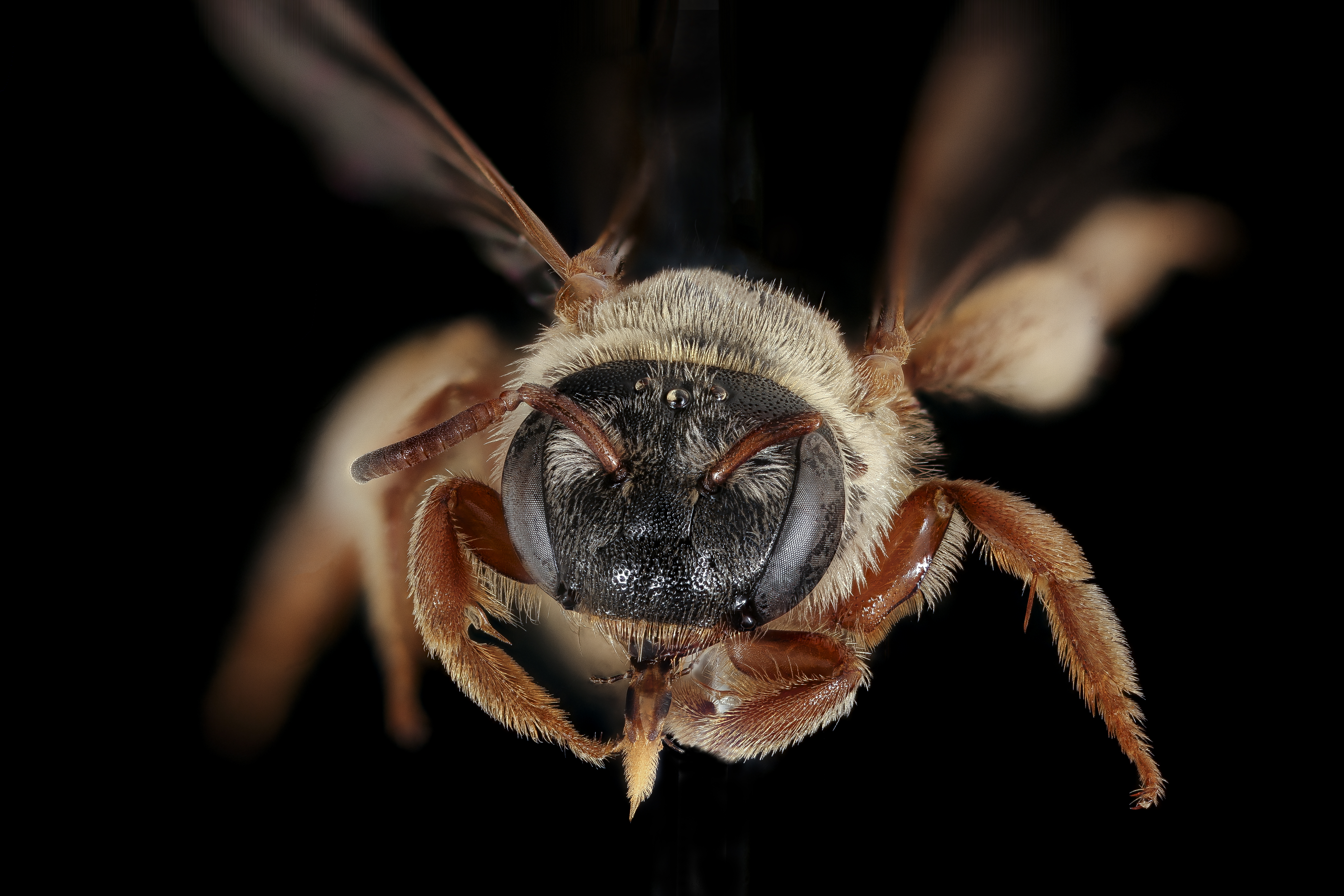
USGS front view

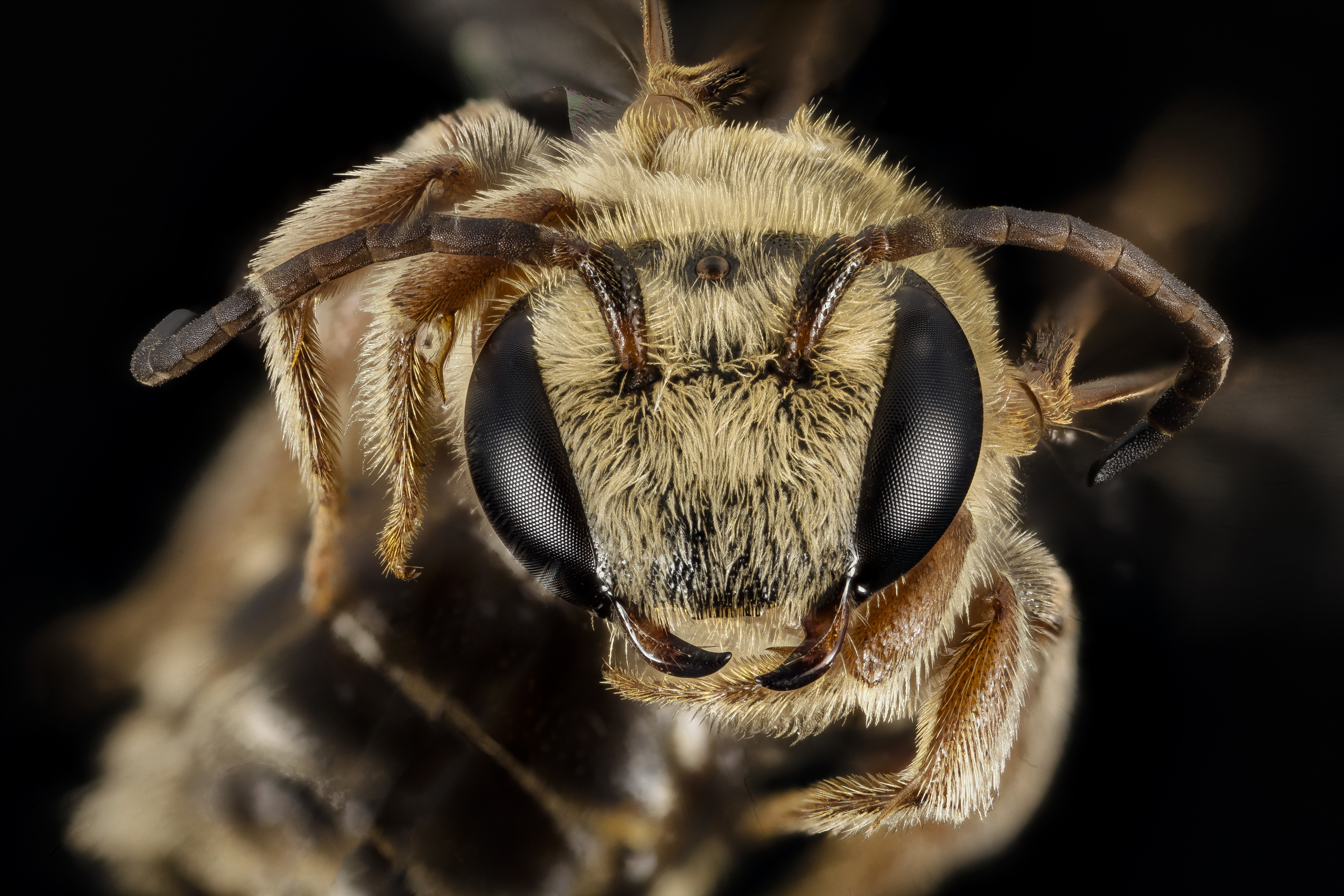
Front view of another example
