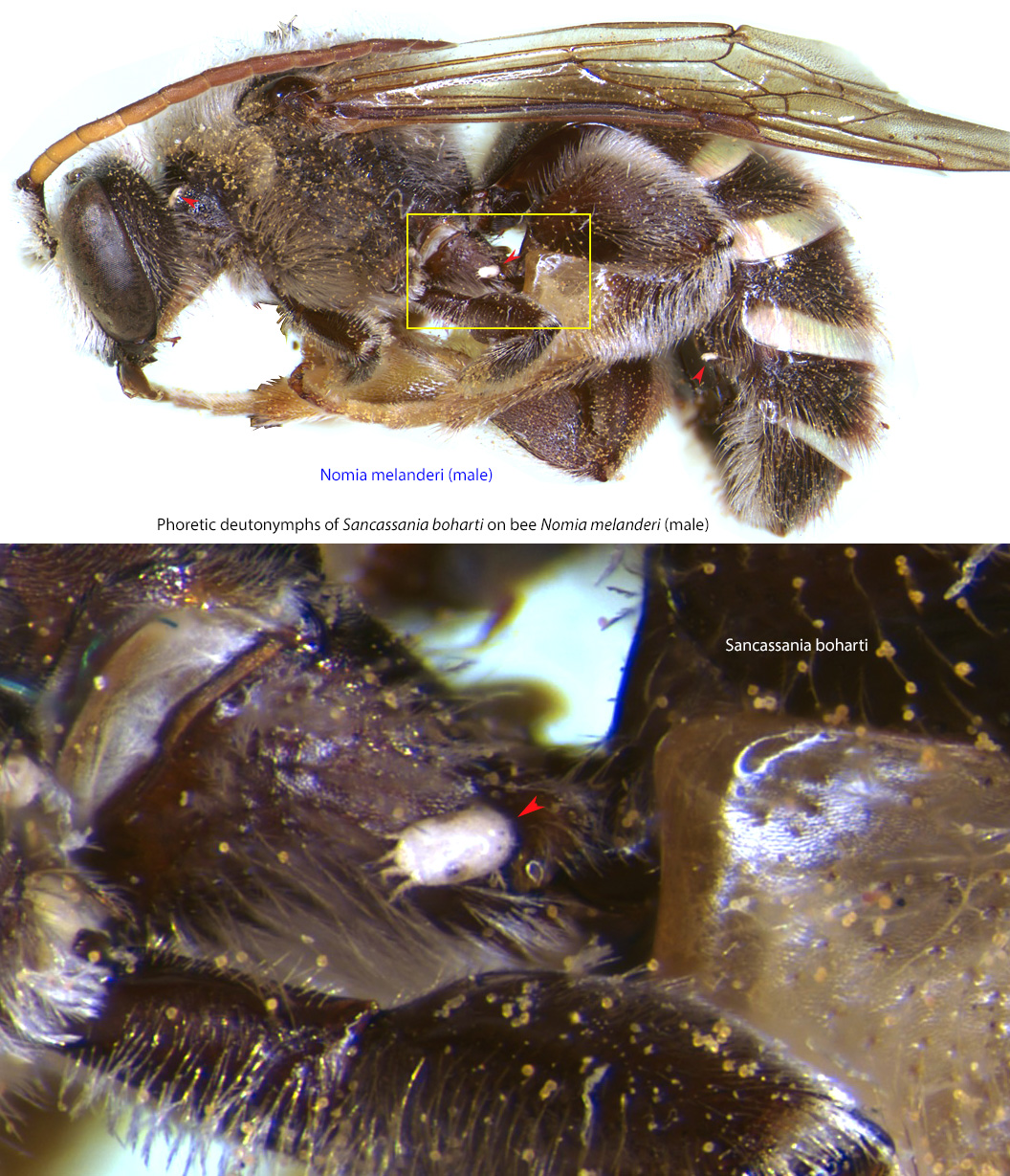
- Male bee. The lower frame is a blow-up of the small rectangle in the upper frame, showing a Sancassania boharti parasitizing him.

Scientific classification
- Kingdom: Animalia
- Phylum: Arthropoda
- Class: Insecta
- Order: Hymenoptera
- Family: Halictidae
- Genus: Nomia
- Subgenus: Nomia (Acunomia)
- Species: N. melanderi

Binomial name
- Nomia melanderi (Cockerell, 1906)

= Alkali bee =

Species of insect

The alkali bee, Nomia melanderi, is a ground-nesting bee native to deserts and semi-arid desert basins of the western United States. It was described by Theodore Dru Alison Cockerell in 1906. While solitary, these bees nest near each other and can form extremely dense aggregations in areas with favorable conditions.

This bee nests in salt-saturated, or alkaline, soil. Like some other bees such as Megachile rotundata, alkali bees are an effective pollinator of alfalfa. The bee uses a specialized technique of opening alfalfa flowers for pollination by applying pressure to snap open the keel of the flower. Because of this and the fact that they prefer pollen to nectar, fly in a wide range of conditions, and perform well regardless of how well the field is watered, alkali bees are preferred to honeybees for alfalfa pollination but have been increasingly supplanted by M. rotundata in recent years. Due to the unusual nesting habits of this bee, farmers have developed methods to accommodate them with salty mud-fields where they can burrow and lay their eggs. Farmers started doing this after realizing that plowing up natural flats like these decreased the yield of alfalfa dramatically.

Juvenile hormone (JH) analog methoprene can serve as a possible limiting factor for alkali bees since female bees are more likely to reach reproductive maturity with JH. Alkali bees are also considered solitary bees because females have their individual nests and live alongside other female alkali bees.

== Biology ==
=== Appearance ===
The alkali bee is about two-thirds the size of a honeybee with black and metallic banding on the abdomen. Females have, but infrequently use, stingers and the males have white faces. Males and females in the northern part of the range are larger than their counterparts to the south. This is theorized to allow larval bees to survive for longer without food and may also be related to a slightly longer day in the summer, allowing for increased brood provisioning.

=== Predators and parasites ===
Larvae-specific threats include bee flies (Bombyliidae) and specifically Heterostylum robustum as well as oil beetles (Meloe niger) and both adults and larvae are susceptible to pesticide kills. Unusually, there are not any known kleptoparasites. It is also preyed upon by the conopid fly Zodion obliquefasciatum and is associated with the mite Imparipes apicola.

This mite has been found in association with alkali bees but not with other species within the genus Nomia. The mites seem to oviposit in conjunction with emergence of fungi in cells (possibly Ascosphaera). The fungi are either within the bodies of unhealthy larvae, but more commonly are found in the feces of healthy larvae. The fungi causes the fecal pellets to be strung together in a characteristic manner. After oviposition, the eggs develop, hatch, mate, feed on the fungus, then leave on the bee when it emerges. One generation of I. apicola is reared per generation of bee, so southern populations of bee which can rear multiple generations in a season are more likely to a have a high presence of mites. Adult females seem to host far more mites than the males who seem to host relatively few, and they fall into cells during the provisioning stage where they carry out their life cycle, One study found that 60% of cells had mites, and the average mite count within these cells was 5.7. Although the mites can reach high densities, they don't appear to harm the bees which is possibly due to their fungivorous nature.

== Distribution and habitat ==
The alkali bee lives in arid climates, primarily desert basins in the western United States from central Washington to southern California and east to western Colorado. They prefer to nest in moist, silty soils that have good drainage, a salty surface, and don't have vegetative groundcover. The hydrology of the soils appears to be the controlling factor for where nests are made. As soil makeup affects water retention and capillary action, soils with some clay and sand but mostly silt are preferred.

== Behavior ==
=== Nesting behavior ===
While solitary, alkali bees frequently nest in high densities. Females lay 1 to 2 eggs a day, and spend most of the day building the cell for the egg. Immediately after emergence a female begins to excavate the main burrow which usually entails digging for about 12 hours. The dirt is removed and using the mandibles and foretarsi, formed into pellets which are then deposited around the entrance to the burrow. The burrows are usually about 15–20 cm in depth, but in laboratory conditions with looser soil, much deeper burrows have been created. In addition to the main vertical burrow, smaller passageways are dug horizontally. From these shorter tunnels, small vertical holes called cells are created for oviposition.

Cell creation usually begins the night after the main burrow is excavated. First, the "mine burrow" is dug and then a soil lining applied to the sides which reduces the size of the cell. Lastly a clear, lipid-rich secretion from the Dufour's gland (in the abdomen) is applied to the interior of the cell to waterproof it.

After the cell is constructed, the female bee begins the process of provisioning. She brings back pollen and mixes it with nectar to form a ball which is then placed in the bottom of the cell. Any debris that makes its way into the cell during this period is meticulously removed. Once the pollen ball is completed, oviposition occurs. This is usually in the late afternoon. The egg is laid on top of the pollen ball, then the female leaves the cell without inspecting it and begins to cap the cell. The egg garners no further attention after this unless it becomes diseased. In this case, the cell will be opened and packed with dirt by the female.

Three or four days after oviposition the egg hatches and the larva begins to consume the pollen ball. Once this has been consumed, the larva (now a prepupa) defecates and begins diapause. In the wild this process takes 11 to 12 days. In the southern region, eggs laid early in the season may emerge after this but for eggs later in the season or for those in the northern part of the range, the pupa will emerge as a bee in the following summer, cued by the warming soil temperatures.

=== Feeding behavior ===
Females must consume pollen as soon as they emerge in order for their ovaries to develop. They continue to consume pollen for at least two weeks. It is believed that because solitary bees have very large, lipid-rich eggs the pollen provides the lipids and amino acids required for making these eggs. Pollen consumption is larger in younger females, and primarily occurs in the afternoon and evening as pollen collected early in the day goes toward larval provisioning.

=== Mating behavior ===
In the first few weeks of the emergence period, the majority of emerging bees are male. Once they emerge, they begin patrolling for females who likely mate soon after emerging. Their attractiveness (driven by pheromones) decreases in the days after emerging. No evidence of courtship has been observed and the copulations last less than 30 seconds. While other males sometimes observe copulation, there isn't evidence for aggression or interference by these males

== Conservation status ==
The alkali bee is not ranked for conservation. Due to its commercially important role as a pollinator of the alfalfa crop in the western and northwestern United States, it is not a species of concern, unlike many native bees.
