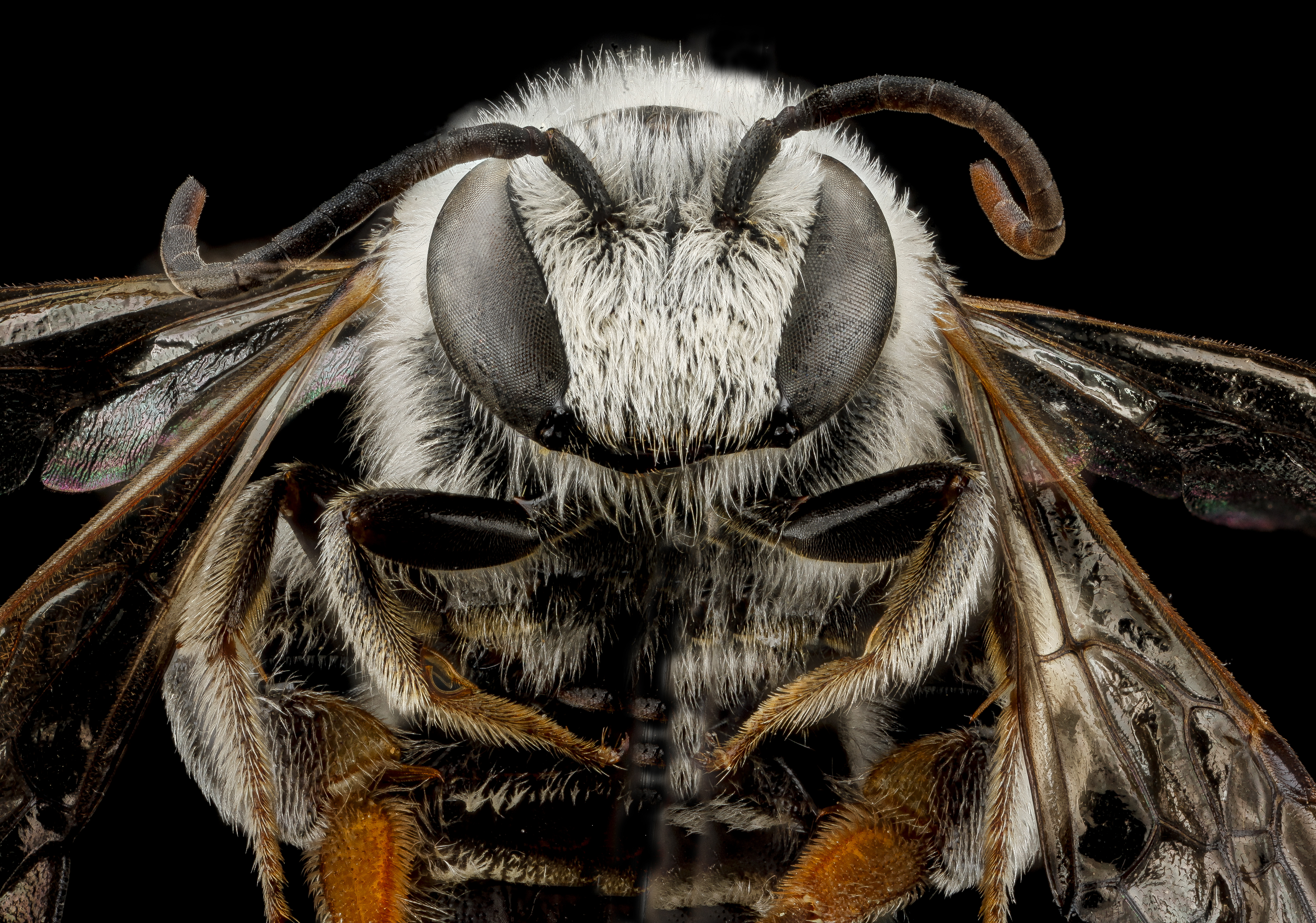
- Nomia universitatis

Scientific classification
- Kingdom: Animalia
- Phylum: Arthropoda
- Clade: Pancrustacea
- Class: Insecta
- Order: Hymenoptera
- Family: Halictidae
- Subfamily: Nomiinae
- Genus: Nomia; Latreille, 1804

Species
- > 150 species in 7 subgenera: Acunomia; Crocisaspidia; Gnathonomia; Hoplonomia; Leuconomia; Nomia; Paulynomia

= Nomia (bee) =

Genus of bees

Nomia is a genus of sweat bees in the family Halictidae. Many species have opalescent bands on the metasoma. Nomia species are moderate-sized bees that nest in the ground. Most species nest solitarily, but some species also nest communally where females share a nest but where there are no queen or worker castes. Nomia species are found Africa, tropical Asia, Australia, and in North America. There are about 130 species world wide.

Nomia melanderi is an important pollinator of alfalfa. They prefer to nest in salty soils. The Walla Walla Valley farmers in Washington State not only sell alfalfa, but some farmers also raise and sell this species of bee.

== Identification ==
=== Wings ===
The marginal cell is rounded with the second submarginal cell being shorter than the first and third (three submarginal cells total). The basal vein is not as curved as other members of the family Halictidae.

=== Face & body ===
Nomia has a rounded face with the eyes melding into the lower margin of the clypeus. As a result, the clypeus doesn't appear to extend abruptly below the face. The abdomen has bands of pearl/ivory that can be tinged with blue or green.

== Nesting ==
Some Nomia nests in large aggregations, with over 700 nests per square yard found at one site (the largest aggregation of bees found in the world). There have been reports of N. melanderi sisters sharing nests as well. Nomia tunnel into the ground.

== See also ==
- List of Nomia species
