= List of bees of Sri Lanka =

Sri Lanka is a tropical island situated close to the southern tip of India. The invertebrate fauna found here is diverse: there are approximately 2 million species of arthropods found across the world and the number is rising, as many new species continue to be discovered. As such, it is difficult to specify the exact number of species found within a certain region. The following list describes the Bees of Sri Lanka.

== Bees ==
Phylum: Arthropoda
Class: Insecta
Order: Hymenoptera. Suborder: Apocrita.

Bees are the primary pollinators of terrestrial flowering plants. The hairs within their bodies help to function as efficient pollinators. The greatest levels of bee diversity are confined to warm temperate regions of the world. There are approximately 70,000 bee species described in the world with nearly 450 genera and 7 families. Sri Lanka comprises 149 species of 38 genera and 4 families. Bee research in Sri Lanka is carried out in large part by Dr. Inoka Karunaratne et al. from University of Peradeniya.

=== Family: Apidae Common bees ===
- Amegilla confusa
- Amegilla quadrifasciata
- Amegilla violacea
- Amegilla mucorea
- Amegilla fallax
- Amegilla subcoerulea
- Amegilla cingulata
- Amegilla cingulifera
- Amegilla comberi
- Amegilla niveocincta
- Amegilla perasserta
- Amegilla puttalama
- Amegilla subinsularis
- Amegilla zonata
- Apis cerana
- Apis dorsata
- Apis florea
- Apis mellifera
- Braunsapis cupulifera
- Braunsapis flaviventris
- Braunsapis mixta
- Braunsapis picitarsis
- Ceratina hieroglyphica
- Ceratina binghami
- Ceratina smaragdula
- Ceratina tanganyicensis
- Ceratina beata
- Ceratina picta
- Nomada adusta
- Nomada antennata
- Nomada bicellularis
- Nomada ceylonica
- Nomada lusca
- Nomada priscilla
- Nomada wickwari
- Tetragonula iridipennis
- Tetragonula praeterita
- Tetralonia commixtana
- Tetralonia fumida
- Tetraloniella taprobanicola
- Thyreus ceylonicus
- Thyreus histrio
- Thyreus insignis
- Thyreus ramosellus
- Thyreus surniculus
- Thyreus takaonis
- Xylocopa aestuans
- Xylocopa amethystina
- Xylocopa auripennis
- Xylocopa bryorum
- Xylocopa caerulea
- Xylocopa dejeanii
- Xylocopa fenestrata
- Xylocopa nasalis
- Xylocopa nigrocaerulea
- Xylocopa ruficornis
- Xylocopa tenuiscapa
- Xylocopa tranquibarica

=== Family Colletidae - Polyester bees ===
- Hylaeus krombeini
- Hylaeus sedens

=== Family: Halictidae - Sweat bees ===
- Ceylalictus appendiculatus
- Ceylalictus horni
- Ceylalictus cereus
- Ceylalictus taprobanae
- Curvinomia formosa
- Curvinomia iridiscens
- Halictus lucidipennis
- Homalictus singhalensis
- Homalictus paradnanus
- Hoplonomia westwoodi
- Lasioglossum amblypygus
- Lasioglossum cire
- Lasioglossum clarum
- Lasioglossum semisculptum
- Lasioglossum vagans
- Lasioglossum carinifrons
- Lasioglossum halictoides
- Lasioglossum serenum
- Lasioglossum alphenum
- Lasioglossum aulacophorum
- Lasioglossum bidentatum
- Lasioglossum kandiense
- Lipotriches basipicta
- Lipotriches bombayensis
- Lipotriches edirisinghei
- Lipotriches exagens
- Lipotriches fervida
- Lipotriches fulvinerva
- Lipotriches karnatakaensis
- Lipotriches krombeini
- Lipotriches notiomorpha
- Lipotriches pulchriventris
- Lipotriches rustica
- Lipotriches torrida
- Nomia aurata
- Nomia crassipes
- Pachyhalictus bedanus
- Pachyhalictus karunaratnei
- Patellapis kalutarae
- Patellapis sigiriella
- Patellapis vincta
- Pseudapis oxybeloides
- Sphecodes biroi
- Sphecodes crassicornis
- Sphecodes decorus
- Steganomus nodicornis
- Systropha tropicalis

=== Family: Megachilidae - Leafcutter bees ===
- Anthidiellum butarsis
- Anthidiellum krombeini
- Anthidiellum ramakrishnae
- Coelioxys angulatus
- Coelioxys apicatus
- Coelioxys capitatus
- Coelioxys confusus
- Coelioxys fenestratus
- Coelioxys fuscipennis
- Coelioxys minuta
- Coelioxys nitidoscutellaris
- Coelioxys formosicola
- Euaspis edentata
- Heriades parvula
- Lithurgus atratus
- Megachile albolineata
- Megachile amputata
- Megachile ardens
- Megachile ceylonica
- Megachile conjuncta
- Megachile disjuncta
- Megachile hera
- Megachile kandyca
- Megachile lanata
- Megachile mystacea
- Megachile nana
- Megachile nigricans
- Megachile reepeni
- Megachile relata
- Megachile umbripennis
- Megachile vestita
- Megachile vigilans
- Pachyanthidium lachrymosum
- Pseudoanthidium orientale
- Pseudoanthidium rotundiventre

== Undescribed ==
- Austronomia sp. 1 determined by Pauly 2003
- Austronomia sp. 2 determined by Pauly 2003
- Gnathonomia sp. 2
- Leuconomia sp. determined by Pauly 2003
- Maynenomia sp. 1
- Maynenomia sp. 2
- Pachynomia sp.
- Amegilla sp.[manuscript name scintillans of Lieftinck, 1977]
- Trigona sp.
