= Pseudoanthidium astafurovae =

Scientific classification
- Kingdom: Animalia
- Phylum: Arthropoda
- Class: Insecta
- Order: Hymenoptera
- Family: Megachilidae
- Genus: Pseudoanthidium
- Species: P. astafurovae

Binomial name
- Pseudoanthidium astafurovae Fateryga, Maharramov & Proshchalykin, 2025

Species of bee

Pseudoanthidium astafurovae is a species of bee in the family Megachilidae described in 2025.

== Identification ==
Pseudoanthidium astafurovae is characterized in the males by the following combination of features:

1. Tergum 6 laterally bulging, without hooked or spiniform protrusions.
2. Emargination of tergum 7 only slightly widening in the apical third, with a rather pointed base (V-shaped emargination).
3. Emargination of tergum 7 bearing a translucent margin.
4. Posterior margin of the scutellum rather rounded in dorsal view.
5. Apical margin of sternum 2 truncate, without a medial protrusion.
6. Yellow preoccipital band reaching the mandibular base.

Pseudoanthidium astafurovae differs from the closely related P. eximium by a more slender penis valve, particularly in its apical part, bearing much shorter hairs. It also differs in having distinctly pointed (rather than rounded) apical margins of sternum 7 and a distinctly pointed apical margin of sternum 8.

== Naming ==
The new species is named after Yulia V. Astafurova of the Zoological Institute of the Russian Academy of Sciences.

== Distribution ==
- Azerbaijan

Described male is collected from Kotam, Ordubad, Nakhchivan.
