= Megachile imitata =

Scientific classification
- Kingdom: Animalia
- Phylum: Arthropoda
- Clade: Pancrustacea
- Class: Insecta
- Order: Hymenoptera
- Family: Megachilidae
- Genus: Megachile
- Species: M. imitata

Binomial name
- Megachile imitata Smith, 1853

Species of leafcutter bee (Megachile)

Megachile imitata is a species of bee in the family Megachilidae. It was described by Smith in 1853.

== Description ==
Megachile imitata is only found in South Africa.

The species was described by Smith in 1853, and he stated the following:

"[Female] Black face has a sooty black pubescence, clypeus anteriorly broadly emarginate; mandibles longitudinally sculptured, having 2 or 3 grooves towards their apex, which is obviously bidentate, the tooth at the apex rounded; wings fuscous, at the side of the metathorax a little fulvous pubescence, on the other parts of the thorax it is sooty black; on the legs above it is a pale fulvous and on the tarsi beneath bright fulvous; calcaria and claws ferruginous. Abdomen entirely covered with fulvous pubescence. "[Male]-coloured as in the other sex, face clothed with long white pubescence; thorax, the tegulae rufotestaceous, anterior femora, tibiae and tarsi and the apical joints of the intermediate and posterior tarsi, ferruginous; posterior legs covered with cinereous pubescence, as well as the thorax and abdomen beneath."

He also stated that the species appearance in general resembled closely to that of Megachile mystacea and Megachile rufiventris.
