= Pseudoanthidium prionognathum =

Scientific classification
- Domain: Eukaryota
- Kingdom: Animalia
- Phylum: Arthropoda
- Class: Insecta
- Order: Hymenoptera
- Family: Megachilidae
- Genus: Pseudoanthidium
- Species: P. prionognathum

Binomial name
- Pseudoanthidium prionognathum (Mavromoustakis, 1935)

Synonyms
- Pachyanthidium prionognathum Mavromoustakis, 1938; Gnathanthidium prionognathum (Mavromoustakis, 1938)

Species of bee

Pseudoanthidium prionognathum is a species of bee belonging to the family Megachilidae, formerly placed into its own genus, Gnathanthidium. The species is found in Southern Africa.
