= Ceylalictus capverdensis =

Scientific classification
- Kingdom: Animalia
- Phylum: Arthropoda
- Clade: Pancrustacea
- Class: Insecta
- Order: Hymenoptera
- Family: Halictidae
- Genus: Ceylalictus
- Species: C. capverdensis

Binomial name
- Ceylalictus capverdensis Pesenko, Pauly & LaRoche, 2002

Species of bee

Ceylalictus capverdensis is a species of sweat bees of the family Halictidae. It is endemic to Cape Verde. The species was described in 2002.
