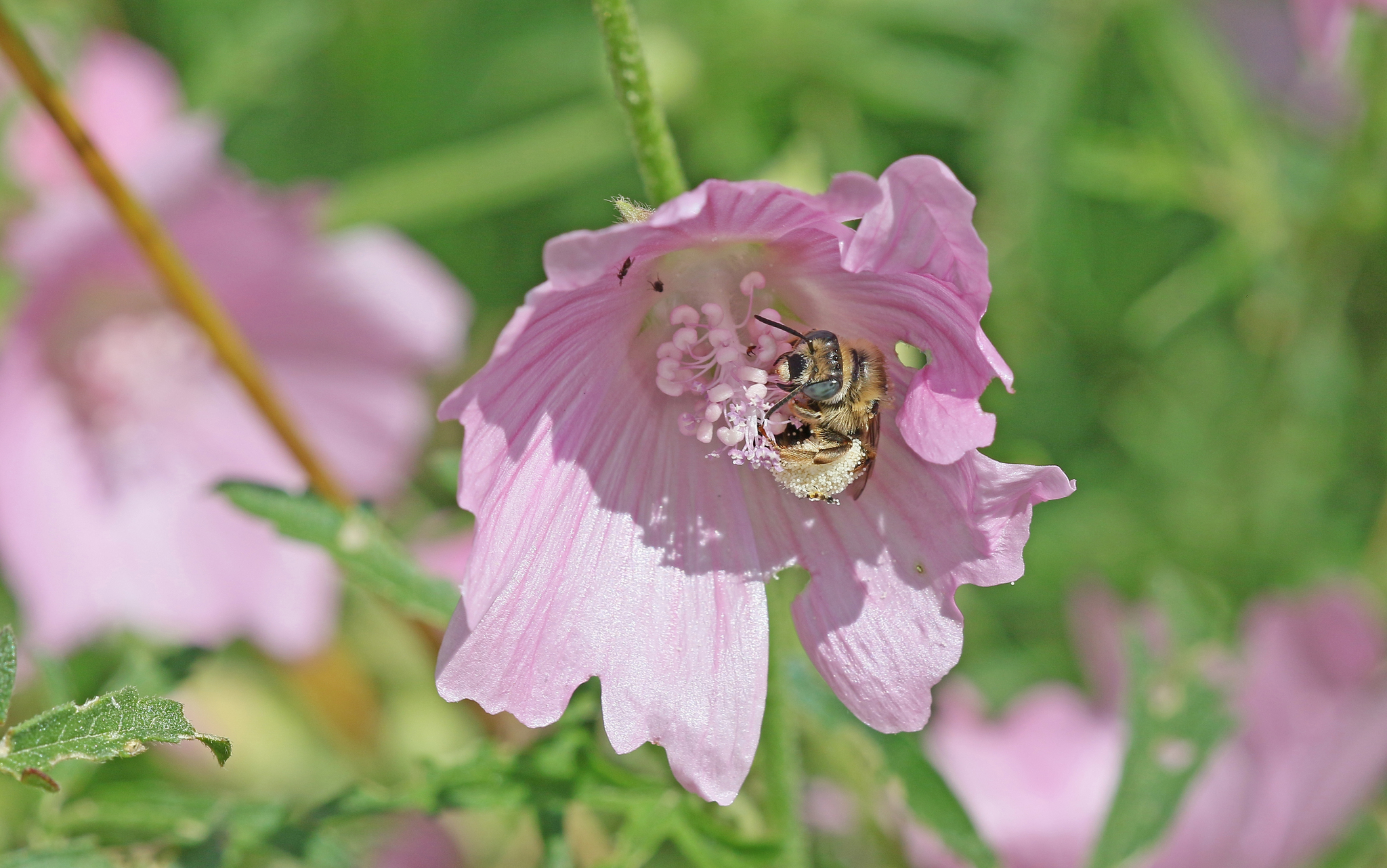
- Mallow longhorn (Tetralonia malvae), Pfaffenhofen, Germany

Scientific classification
- Domain: Eukaryota
- Kingdom: Animalia
- Phylum: Arthropoda
- Class: Insecta
- Order: Hymenoptera
- Family: Apidae
- Genus: Tetralonia
- Species: T. malvae

Binomial name
- Tetralonia malvae (Rossi, 1790)

Synonyms
- Tetralonia macroglossa (Illiger, 1806)

= Tetralonia malvae =

Species of bee

Tetralonia malvae, also known as the Mallow longhorn, is a species of insect belonging to the family Apidae. The bee takes pollen from oligolectic sources on the mallow family (Malvaceae).

== Behaviour ==
They generally nest on bare or sparsely overgrown ground, even to heavily sloping surfaces, or in steep walls in self-dug corridors in the earth, often in aggregations. The preferred substrate is sand, loess or loess clay. The nest consists of a corridor that can branch out. The brood cells are more or less upright and are inside with a shiny layer coated. The species inhabits dry and warm locations; vineyards, fallow and ruderal areas, sand and clay pits, steep banks, from plains to the montane altitude level.

== Parasitism ==
They are parasitised by the cuckoo bee species Triepeolus tristis. Another nest parasite is a bladder-head fly of the genus Conops.

== Flight period ==
They can be seen in one generation from June to August.

== Distribution ==
The species is found from Spain, across southern and central Europe, southern Russia, Asia Minor and Caucasus to Central Asia; north to Lithuania and Orenburg; south to Sicily, Crete, Syria, Iraq and Northern Iran.
