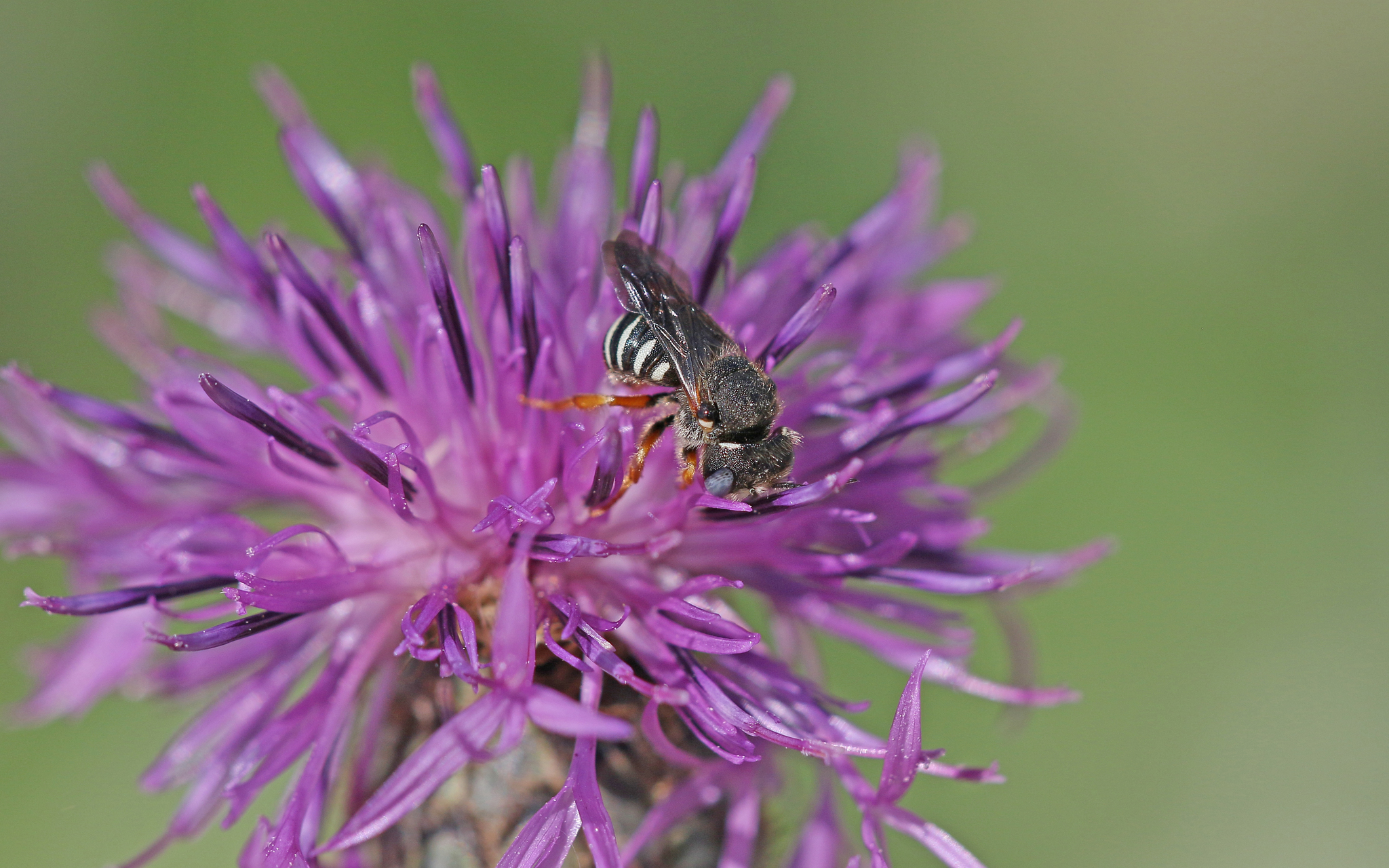
- In Illmitz, Austria

Scientific classification
- Domain: Eukaryota
- Kingdom: Animalia
- Phylum: Arthropoda
- Class: Insecta
- Order: Hymenoptera
- Family: Megachilidae
- Genus: Pseudoanthidium
- Species: P. tenellum

Binomial name
- Pseudoanthidium tenellum (Mocsáry, 1881)

Synonyms
- Anthidium tenellum Mocsáry, 1879

= Pseudoanthidium tenellum =

Species of bee

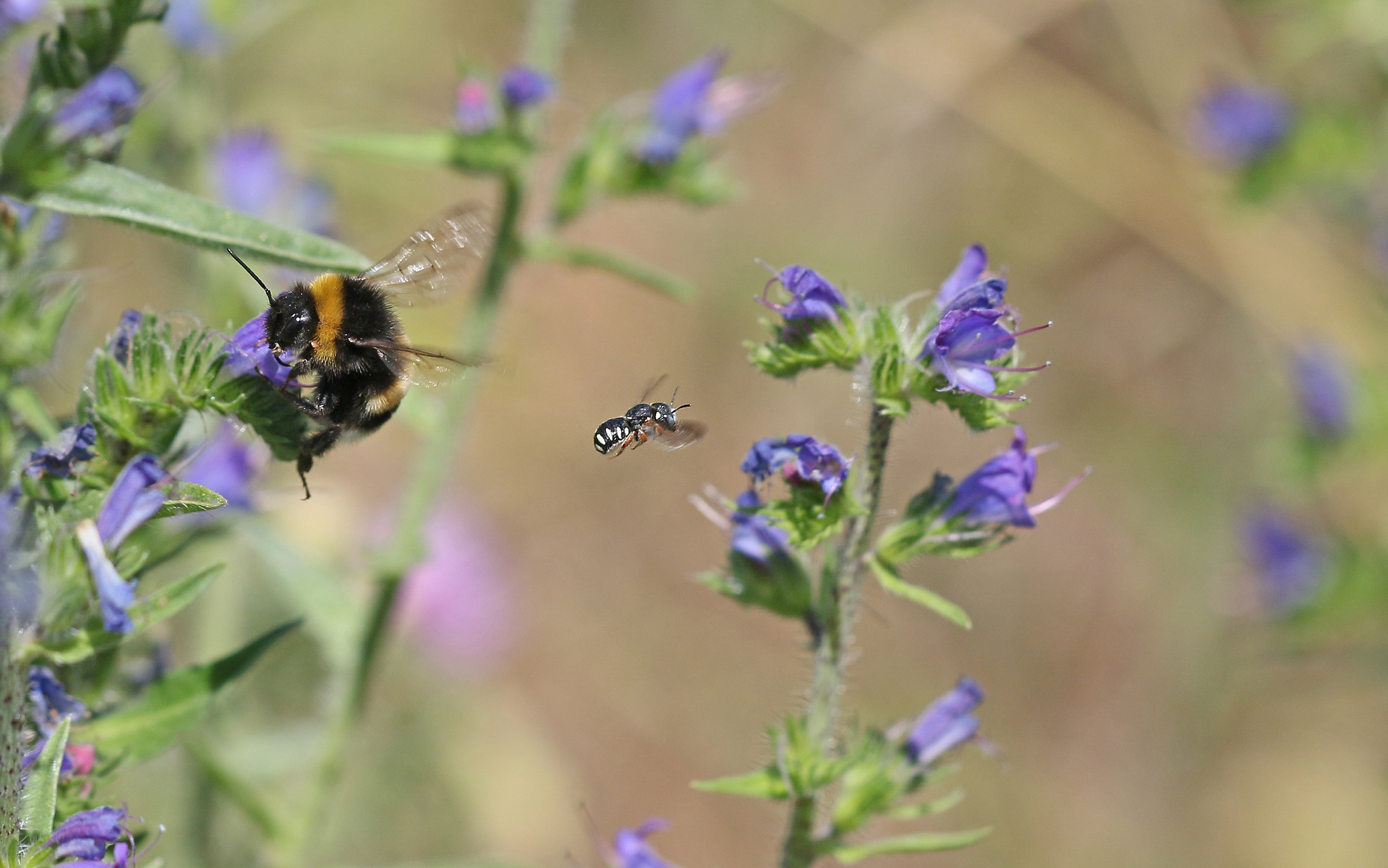
In Illmitz, Austria

Pseudoanthidium tenellum is a species of bee in the family Megachilidae.

== Taxonomy ==
The species is oligolectic to Asteraceae of the subfamily Carduoideae.

The specific name derives from Latin "tenellum" = "very tender, tender feeling".

== Habitat and distribution ==
Pseudoanthidium tenellum is found from North Africa to Algeria. In Eurasia from eastern Germany and Austria eastwards to Bulgaria, according to an isolated report from Tajikistan (Popov 1967). The species was first recorded in Germany in 1996 in Saxony-Anhalt, followed by further finds there in 2001 and 2002 (Burger & Ruhnke 2004). In Austria, this species is reported only from Lower Austria and Burgenland. In Central Europe, the species is limited to salty soils. The species nests inside galls formed by Lipara flies.

== Ecology ==
The flight period is in one generation from June to August. P. tenellum feeds on pollen sources, mainly from wetland plants in Bidens and Pulicaria genera.
