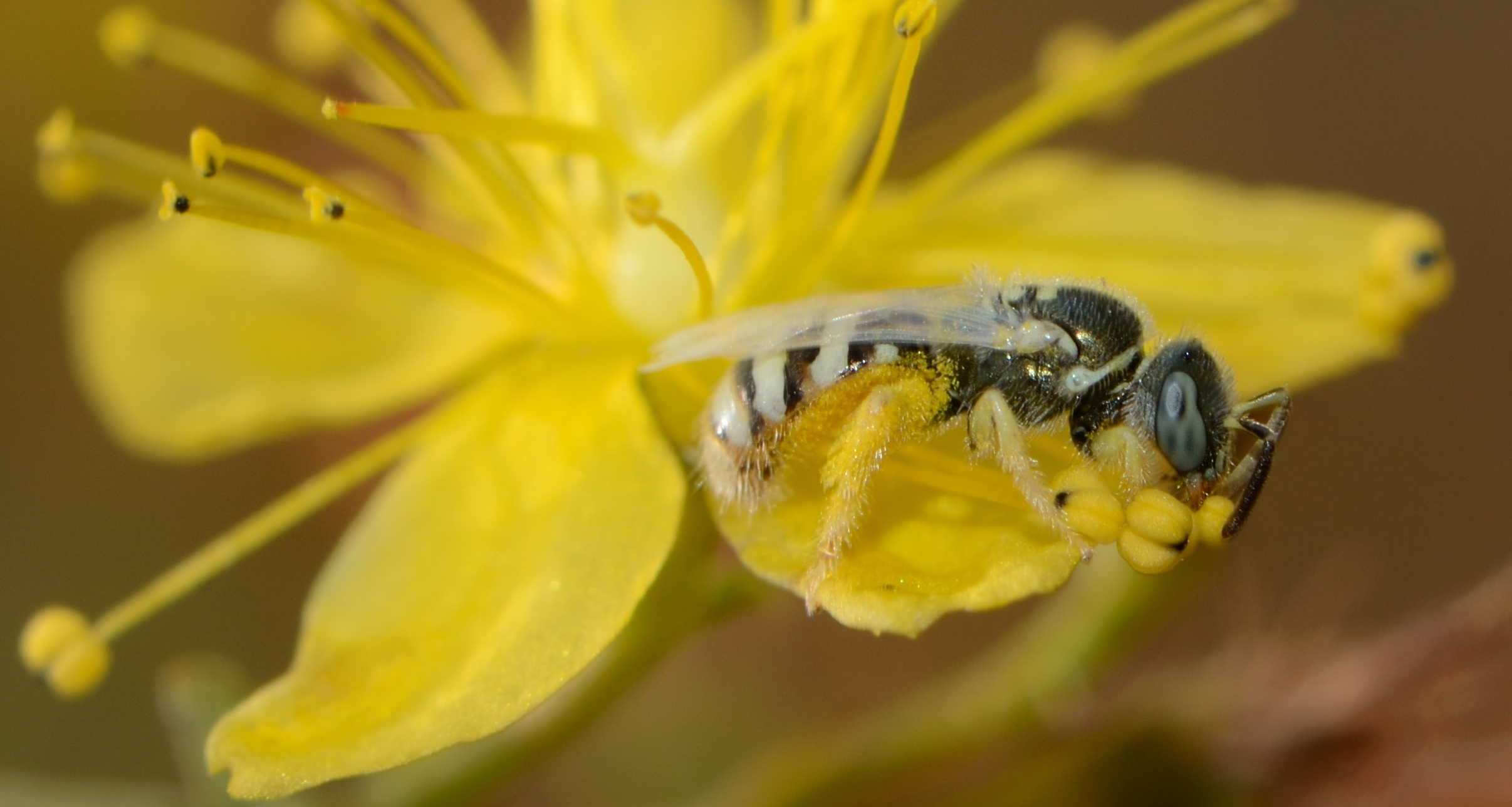
- C. variegatus collecting pollen from Hypericum triquetrifolium

Scientific classification
- Domain: Eukaryota
- Kingdom: Animalia
- Phylum: Arthropoda
- Class: Insecta
- Order: Hymenoptera
- Family: Halictidae
- Genus: Ceylalictus
- Species: C. variegatus

Binomial name
- Ceylalictus variegatus Olivier, 1789

Synonyms
- Nomioides fasciatus Friese, 1898 Nomioides syrphoides Walker, 1871

= Ceylalictus variegatus =

Species of bee

Ceylalictus variegatus is a species of bee in the family Halictidae. The species was erected in 1789 by Guillaume-Antoine Olivier.
