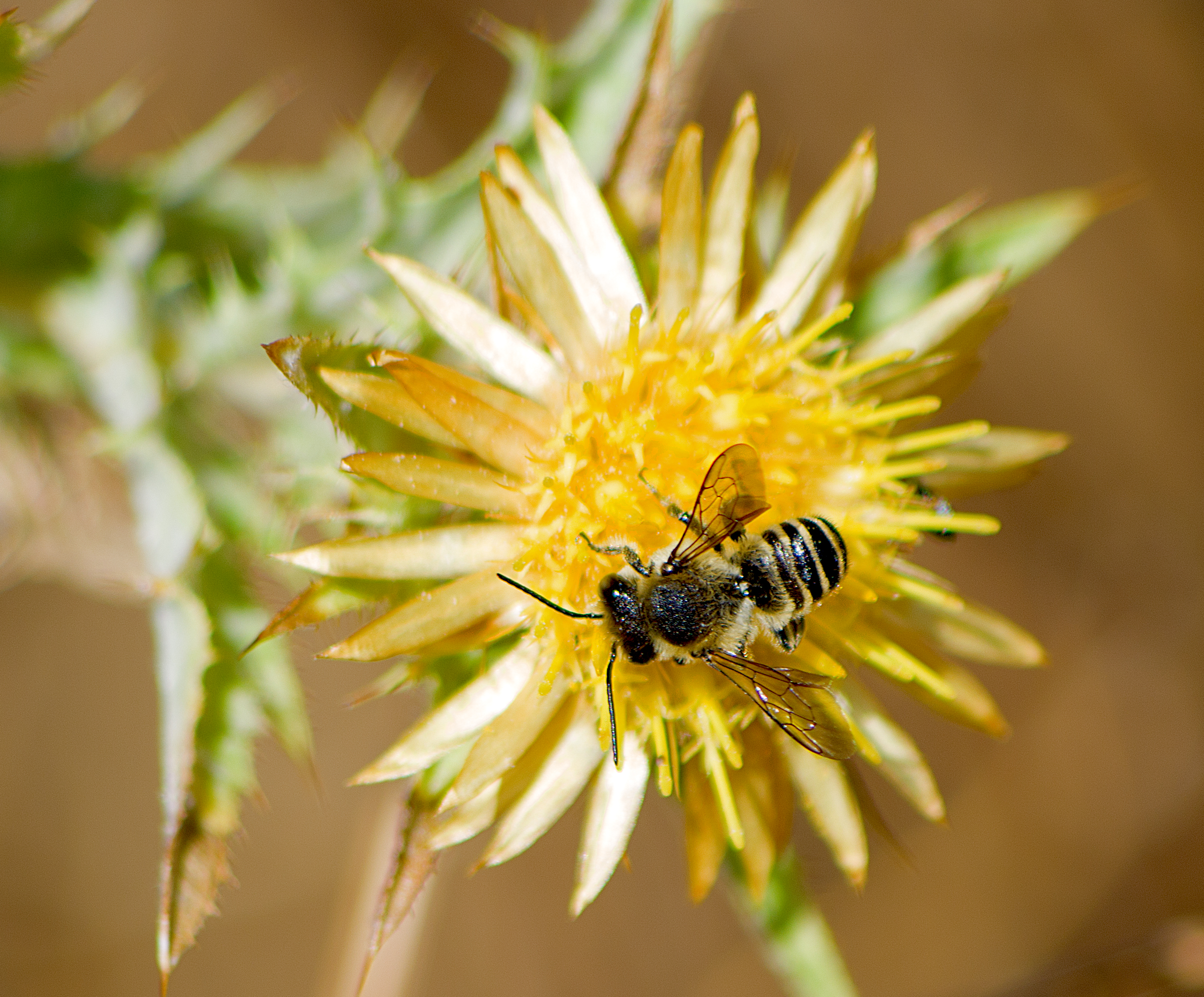
- Lithurgus chrysurus

Scientific classification
- Domain: Eukaryota
- Kingdom: Animalia
- Phylum: Arthropoda
- Class: Insecta
- Order: Hymenoptera
- Family: Megachilidae
- Subfamily: Lithurginae
- Genus: Lithurgus; Berthold, 1827

Synonyms
- Lithurge Latreille, 1825 (Unav.); Liturgus Ashmead, 1899 (Missp.)

= Lithurgus =

Genus of bees

Lithurgus is a genus of bees in the family Megachilidae.

== Species ==
- Lithurgus albofacialis Gupta, 1993
- Lithurgus andrewsi Cockerell, 1909
- Lithurgus atratiformis Cockerell, 1905
- Lithurgus atratus Smith, 1853
- Lithurgus australior Cockerell, 1919
- Lithurgus bractipes Perkins & Cheesman, 1928
- Lithurgus cephalotes (van der Zanden, 1977)
- Lithurgus chrysurus Fonscolombe, 1834 (Mediterranean wood-boring bee)
- Lithurgus collaris Smith, 1873
- Lithurgus collieri Cockerell, 1929
- Lithurgus cornutus (Fabricius, 1787)
- Lithurgus fortis Cockerell, 1929
- Lithurgus huberi Ducke, 1907
- Lithurgus hypoleucus Cockerell, 1937
- Lithurgus indicus Gupta, 1993
- Lithurgus illudens Saussure, 1890
- Lithurgus lissopoda (Cameron, 1908)
- Lithurgus magnus (Rahman, 1997)
- Lithurgus nigricans (Cameron, 1898)
- Lithurgus nigroabdominalis Gupta, 1993
- Lithurgus ogasawarensis Yasumatsu, 1955
- Lithurgus ovoabdominalis Gupta, 1993
- Lithurgus pullatus Vachal, 1903
- Lithurgus rufipes Smith, 1853
- Lithurgus scabrosus (Smith, 1859)
- Lithurgus sparganotes (Schletterer, 1891)
- Lithurgus spiniferus Cameron, 1905
- Lithurgus tibialis Morawitz, 1875
- Lithurgus tiwarii Gupta & Tewari, 1987
- Lithurgus unifasciatus Radoszkowski, 1882
- Lithurgus veeravaliensis Gupta, 1993
- Lithurgus xishuangensis Wu, 2006
