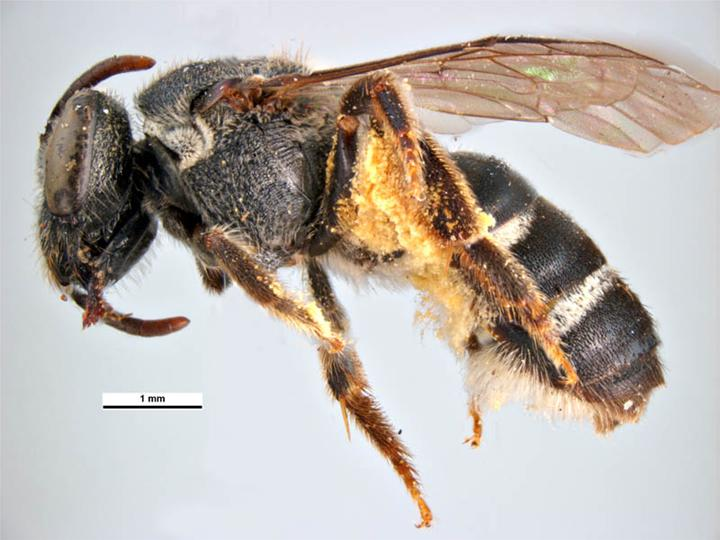
- Patellapis stirlingi

Scientific classification
- Kingdom: Animalia
- Phylum: Arthropoda
- Class: Insecta
- Order: Hymenoptera
- Family: Halictidae
- Subfamily: Halictinae
- Tribe: Halictini
- Genus: Patellapis; Friese, 1909

= Patellapis =

Genus of bees

Patellapis is a genus of bees belonging to the family Halictidae.

The species of this genus are found in Europe, North America, Africa, and Australia.

Species:

- Patellapis aberdarica (Cockerell, 1945)
- Patellapis abessinica (Friese, 1916)
- Patellapis abnormis Timmermann, 2009
- Patellapis africana Timmermann, 2009
- Patellapis albipilata (Walker, 1996)
- Patellapis albofasciata (Smith, 1879)
- Patellapis albofilosa (Cockerell, 1937)
- Patellapis albolineola (Meade-Waldo, 1916)
- Patellapis alopex (Cockerell, 1937)
- Patellapis andersoni (Cockerell, 1945)
- Patellapis andreniformis (Friese, 1925)
- Patellapis andrenoides (Friese, 1909)
- Patellapis assamica (Blüthgen, 1926)
- Patellapis atricilla (Cockerell, 1940)
- Patellapis ausica (Cockerell, 1945)
- Patellapis azurea (Pauly, 2007)
- Patellapis baralonga (Cockerell, 1939)
- Patellapis bedana (Blüthgen, 1926)
- Patellapis benoiti (Pauly, 1989)
- Patellapis bidentata Timmermann, 2009
- Patellapis bifurcata Timmermann, 2009
- Patellapis bihamata (Blüthgen, 1926)
- Patellapis bilineata (Friese, 1909)
- Patellapis binghami (W.F.Kirby, 1900)
- Patellapis braunsella Michener, 1978
- Patellapis braunsi Timmermann, 2009
- Patellapis burmana (Blüthgen, 1926)
- Patellapis buruana (Blüthgen, 1926)
- Patellapis burungana (Cockerell, 1937)
- Patellapis burungensis (Cockerell, 1937)
- Patellapis calvini (Cockerell, 1937)
- Patellapis calviniensis (Cockerell, 1934)
- Patellapis cameroni Timmermann, 2009
- Patellapis capillipalpis (Cockerell, 1946)
- Patellapis carinostriata (Pauly, 1984)
- Patellapis castanea (Benoist, 1962)
- Patellapis celebensis (Blüthgen, 1931)
- Patellapis cerealis (Cockerell, 1945)
- Patellapis chaetalictus
- Patellapis chubbi (Cockerell, 1937)
- Patellapis cincticauda (Cockerell, 1946)
- Patellapis cinctifera (Cockerell, 1946)
- Patellapis cinctulella (Cockerell, 1946)
- Patellapis coccinea (Benoist, 1962)
- Patellapis cockerelli Timmermann, 2009
- Patellapis communis (Smith, 1879)
- Patellapis concinnula (Cockerell, 1946)
- Patellapis corallina (Benoist, 1944)
- Patellapis dapanensis (Blüthgen, 1926)
- Patellapis delphinensis (Benoist, 1964)
- Patellapis depressa Timmermann, 2009
- Patellapis disposita (Cameron, 1905)
- Patellapis dispositina (Cockerell, 1934)
- Patellapis doleritica Timmermann
- Patellapis drakensbergensis Timmermann, 2009
- Patellapis eardleyi Timmermann, 2009
- Patellapis erythropyga (Benoist, 1964)
- Patellapis fisheri Pauly, 2001
- Patellapis flacourtiae (Pauly, 2007)
- Patellapis flavofasciata (Friese, 1915)
- Patellapis flavorufa (Cockerell, 1937)
- Patellapis flavovittata (W.F.Kirby, 1900)
- Patellapis formosicola (Blüthgen, 1926)
- Patellapis friesei Timmermann, 2009
- Patellapis fuliginosa (Cockerell, 1937)
- Patellapis fynbosensis Timmermann, 2009
- Patellapis gabonensis (Pauly, 1989)
- Patellapis gessorum Timmermann, 2009
- Patellapis glabra (Pauly, 1989)
- Patellapis gowdeyi (Cockerell, 1937)
- Patellapis gruenebergensis Timmermann, 2009
- Patellapis hakkiesdraadi Timmermann, 2009
- Patellapis hargreavesi (Cockerell, 1946)
- Patellapis harunganae (Pauly, 1989)
- Patellapis heterozonia (Cockerell)
- Patellapis heterozonica (Cockerell, 1937)
- Patellapis hirsuta (Pauly, 1984)
- Patellapis impunctata Timmermann, 2009
- Patellapis inelegans (Benoist, 1964)
- Patellapis interstitialis (Cameron, 1903)
- Patellapis intricata (Vachal, 1895)
- Patellapis itigiensis Kuhlmann & Pauly, 2010
- Patellapis ivoirensis (Pauly, 1989)
- Patellapis javana (Blüthgen, 1926)
- Patellapis joffrei (Benoist, 1962)
- Patellapis kabetensis (Cockerell, 1937)
- Patellapis kahuziensis Kuhlmann & Pauly, 2010
- Patellapis kalutarae (Cockerell, 1911)
- Patellapis kamerunensis (Friese, 1914)
- Patellapis karooensis Timmermann, 2009
- Patellapis katangensis (Cockerell, 1934)
- Patellapis kavirondica (Cockerell, 1945)
- Patellapis keiseri (Benoist, 1964)
- Patellapis kinabaluensis (Pauly, 2007)
- Patellapis kivuensis (Pauly, 1989)
- Patellapis kivuicola (Cockerell, 1937)
- Patellapis knersvlaktei Kuhlmann & Pauly, 2010
- Patellapis knysnae (Cockerell, 1945)
- Patellapis kocki (Blüthgen, 1931)
- Patellapis kristenseni (Friese, 1915)
- Patellapis leonis (Cockerell, 1940)
- Patellapis lepesmei (Benoist, 1944)
- Patellapis limbata (Benoist, 1962)
- Patellapis liodoma (Vachal, 1895)
- Patellapis lioscutalis (W.u.Pesenko, 1997)
- Patellapis lombokensis (Blüthgen, 1926)
- Patellapis longifacies Timmermann, 2009
- Patellapis lyalli (Pauly, 2001)
- Patellapis macrozonia (Cockerell, 1937)
- Patellapis malachurina (Cockerell, 1937)
- Patellapis mandela Timmermann, 2009
- Patellapis mandrakae Pauly, 2001
- Patellapis merescens (Cockerell, 1919)
- Patellapis micheneri Timmermann, 2009
- Patellapis micropastina (Cockerell, 1940)
- Patellapis microzonia (Cockerell, 1937)
- Patellapis minima (Friese, 1909)
- Patellapis minutior (Friese, 1909)
- Patellapis mirandicornis (Cockerell, 1939)
- Patellapis montagui (Cockerell, 1941)
- Patellapis moshiensis (Cockerell, 1937)
- Patellapis mosselina (Cockerell, 1945)
- Patellapis mpalaensis Pauly, 2016
- Patellapis murbana (Blüthgen, 1931)
- Patellapis namaquensis Timmermann, 2009
- Patellapis natalensis Timmermann, 2009
- Patellapis neavei (Cockerell, 1946)
- Patellapis nefasitica (Cockerell, 1935)
- Patellapis negritica (Blüthgen, 1926)
- Patellapis neli (Cockerell, 1937)
- Patellapis nilssoni Pauly, 2001
- Patellapis ninae Timmermann, 2009
- Patellapis nomioides (Friese, 1909)
- Patellapis obscurescens (Cockerell, 1940)
- Patellapis ochracea (Pauly, 1989)
- Patellapis pachyvertex (Pauly, 2007)
- Patellapis pallidicincta (Cockerell, 1933)
- Patellapis pallidicinctula (Cockerell, 1939)
- Patellapis partita (Cockerell, 1933)
- Patellapis pastina (Cockerell, 1937)
- Patellapis pastinella (Cockerell, 1939)
- Patellapis pastiniformis (Cockerell, 1939)
- Patellapis pastinops (Cockerell, 1941)
- Patellapis patriciformis (Cockerell, 1933)
- Patellapis patricius (Strand, 1911)
- Patellapis paulyi Timmermann, 2009
- Patellapis pearsoni (Cockerell, 1933)
- Patellapis pearstonensis (Cameron, 1905)
- Patellapis penangensis (Blüthgen, 1926)
- Patellapis perineti (Benoist, 1954)
- Patellapis perlucens (Cockerell, 1933)
- Patellapis perpansa (Cockerell, 1933)
- Patellapis picturata (Benoist, 1962)
- Patellapis platti (Cockerell, 1937)
- Patellapis plicata (Pauly, 1989)
- Patellapis pondoensis (Cockerell, 1937)
- Patellapis probita (Cockerell, 1933)
- Patellapis problematica Timmermann, 2009
- Patellapis promita (Cockerell, 1934)
- Patellapis pseudomontagui Timmermann, 2009
- Patellapis pseudonomioides (Pauly, 2001)
- Patellapis pseudorubricata Timmermann, 2009
- Patellapis pseudothoracica (Blüthgen, 1926)
- Patellapis puangensis (Cockerell, 1937)
- Patellapis pubens (Benoist, 1964)
- Patellapis pulchricincta (Cockerell, 1933)
- Patellapis pulchrihirta (Cockerell, 1933)
- Patellapis pulchrilucens (Cockerell, 1943)
- Patellapis punctifrons (Pauly, 1984)
- Patellapis renosterveldi Timmermann, 2009
- Patellapis reticulata Timmermann, 2009
- Patellapis reticulosa (Dalla Torre, 1896)
- Patellapis retigera (Cockerell, 1940)
- Patellapis richtersveldi Timmermann, 2009
- Patellapis rothschildiana (Vachal, 1909)
- Patellapis rozeni Timmermann, 2009
- Patellapis rubricata Timmermann, 2009
- Patellapis rubrotibialis (Cockerell, 1946)
- Patellapis rufobasalis (Alfken, 1930)
- Patellapis rutshuruensis Kuhlmann & Pauly, 2010
- Patellapis ruwensorensis (Strand, 1911)
- Patellapis sabinae Timmermann, 2009
- Patellapis sakagamii Timmermann, 2009
- Patellapis sanguinibasis (Cockerell, 1939)
- Patellapis schultzei (Friese, 1909)
- Patellapis semipastina (Cockerell, 1940)
- Patellapis serrifera (Cockerell, 1937)
- Patellapis sidula (Cockerell, 1937)
- Patellapis sigiriella (Cockerell, 1911)
- Patellapis spinulosa (Cockerell, 1941)
- Patellapis stanleyi (Cockerell, 1945)
- Patellapis stirlingi (Cockerell, 1910)
- Patellapis stoeberia Timmermann, 2009
- Patellapis striata (Pauly, 1989)
- Patellapis suarezensis (Benoist, 1962)
- Patellapis sublustrans (Cockerell, 1919)
- Patellapis subpatricia (Strand, 1911)
- Patellapis subvittata (Cockerell, 1937)
- Patellapis suprafulva (Cockerell, 1946)
- Patellapis tecta (Pauly, 1989)
- Patellapis tenuicincta (Cockerell, 1939)
- Patellapis tenuihirta (Cockerell, 1939)
- Patellapis tenuimarginata (Friese, 1925)
- Patellapis terminalis (Smith, 1853)
- Patellapis territa (Cockerell, 1937)
- Patellapis timpageleri Timmermann, 2009
- Patellapis tinctula (Cockerell, 1937)
- Patellapis trachyna (W.u.Pesenko, 1997)
- Patellapis trifilosa (Cockerell, 1945)
- Patellapis trizonula (Friese, 1909)
- Patellapis tshibindica (Cockerell, 1939)
- Patellapis turneri Timmermann, 2009
- Patellapis unifasciata (Cockerell, 1937)
- Patellapis upembae Kuhlmann & Pauly, 2010
- Patellapis upembensis (Pauly, 1989)
- Patellapis vanaja (Blüthgen, 1926)
- Patellapis villosicauda (Cockerell, 1937)
- Patellapis vincta (Walker, 1860)
- Patellapis viridifilosa (Cockerell, 1946)
- Patellapis virungae Timmermann, 2009
- Patellapis vittata (Smith, 1853)
- Patellapis vumbensis (Cockerell, 1940)
- Patellapis weisi (Friese, 1915)
- Patellapis wenzeli (Pauly, 2001)
- Patellapis yunnanica (W.u.Pesenko, 1997)
- Patellapis zacephala (Cockerell, 1937)
- Patellapis zaleuca (Cockerell, 1937)
