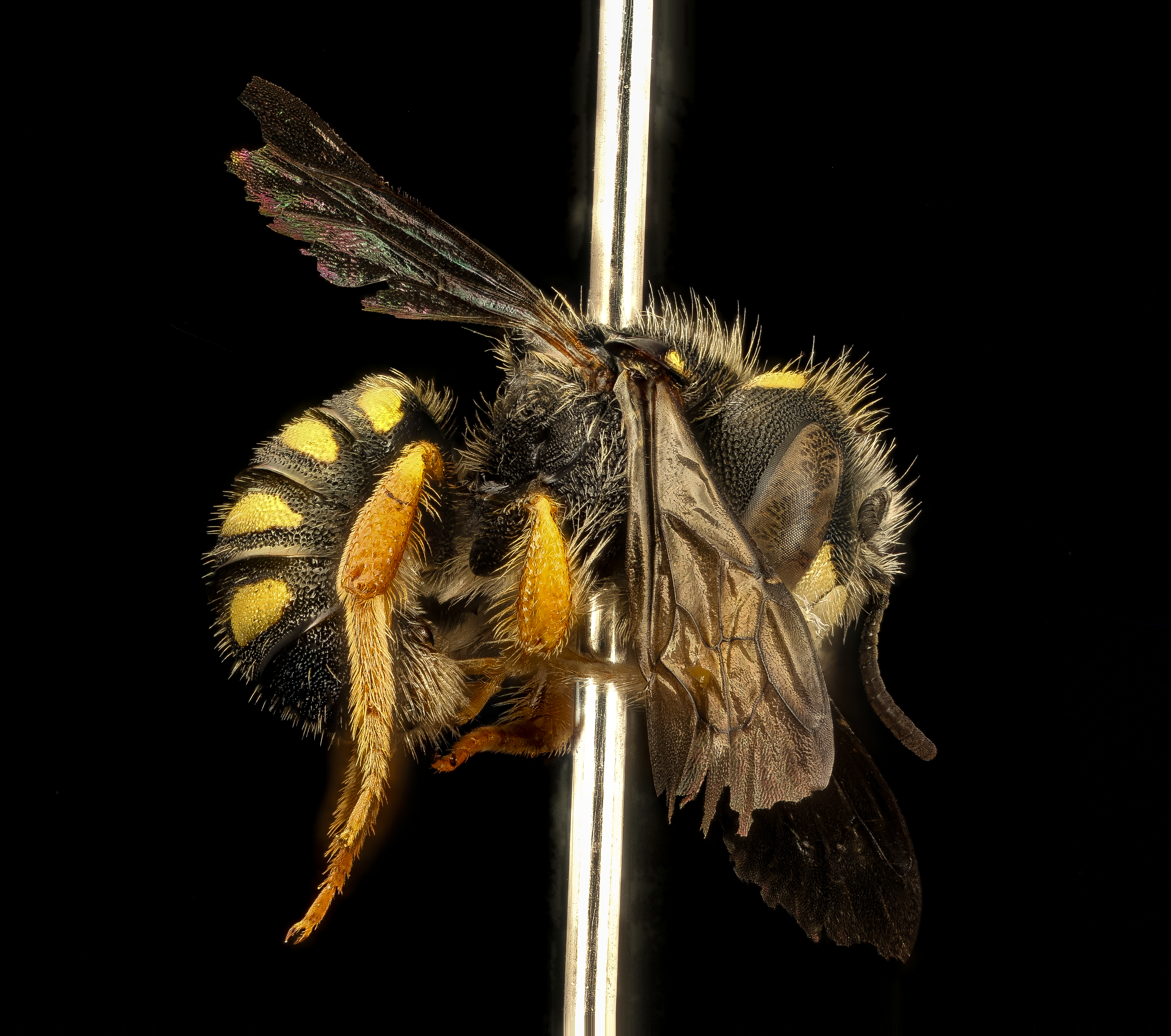
- Pseudoanthidium nanum

Scientific classification
- Kingdom: Animalia
- Phylum: Arthropoda
- Class: Insecta
- Order: Hymenoptera
- Family: Megachilidae
- Genus: Pseudoanthidium; Friese, 1898

= Pseudoanthidium =

Genus of bees

Pseudoanthidium is a genus of bees belonging to the family Megachilidae. The species of this genus are found in Eurasia, Africa and Australia.

== Species ==
- Pseudoanthidium acutum Pasteels, 1984
- Pseudoanthidium alpinum (Morawitz, 1874)
- Pseudoanthidium amoenum (Pasteels, 1969)
- Pseudoanthidium arenosum (Warncke, 1982)
- Pseudoanthidium astafurovae Fateryga, Maharramov & Proshchalykin, 2025
- Pseudoanthidium beaumonti (Benoist, 1950)
- Pseudoanthidium bicoloripenne (Pasteels, 1981)
- Pseudoanthidium brachiatum Michener & Griswold, 1994
- Pseudoanthidium braunsi (Friese, 1904)
- Pseudoanthidium bytinskii (Mavromoustakis, 1948)
- Pseudoanthidium canariense (Mavromoustakis, 1954)
- Pseudoanthidium chenggongense Niu & Zhu, 2021
- Pseudoanthidium circinatum (Wu, 2004)
- Pseudoanthidium cribratum (Morawitz, 1875)
- Pseudoanthidium damaraense (Mavromoustakis, 1936)
- Pseudoanthidium deesense (Mavromoustakis, 1948)
- Pseudoanthidium enslini (Alfken, 1928)
- Pseudoanthidium eximium (Giraud, 1863)
- Pseudoanthidium flaviventre Cameron, 1897
- Pseudoanthidium guichardi (Pasteels, 1980)
- Pseudoanthidium guillarmodi (Mavromoustakis, 1951)
- Pseudoanthidium haplogastrum (Mavromoustakis, 1951)
- Pseudoanthidium honestum (Cockerell, 1936)
- Pseudoanthidium immaculatum (Smith, 1854)
- Pseudoanthidium jocosum (Pasteels, 1984)
- Pseudoanthidium junodi (Friese, 1904)
- Pseudoanthidium katbergense (Mavromoustakis, 1940)
- Pseudoanthidium kunesense Niu & Zhu, 2021
- Pseudoanthidium lanificum (Smith, 1879)
- Pseudoanthidium latitarse Pasteels, 1984
- Pseudoanthidium ludingense (Wu, 1993)
- Pseudoanthidium matjesfonteinense (Mavromoustakis, 1934)
- Pseudoanthidium melanurum (Klug, 1832)
- Pseudoanthidium micronitens Pasteels, 1981
- Pseudoanthidium micrurum (Cockerell, 1935)
- Pseudoanthidium minutulum (Brauns, 1905)
- Pseudoanthidium mlanjense (Mavromoustakis, 1936)
- Pseudoanthidium nanum (Mocsáry, 1881)
- Pseudoanthidium nigronitens (Pasteels, 1984)
- Pseudoanthidium nitidorubrum (Pasteels, 1984)
- Pseudoanthidium obscuratum (Morawitz, 1875)
- Pseudoanthidium ochrognathum (Alfken, 1932)
- Pseudoanthidium octodentatum (Pérez, 1895)
- Pseudoanthidium orientale (Bingham, 1897)
- Pseudoanthidium pictipes (Morawitz, 1894)
- Pseudoanthidium piliventre (Friese, 1913)
- Pseudoanthidium prionognathum (Mavromoustakis, 1938)
- Pseudoanthidium puncticolle (Morawitz, 1888)
- Pseudoanthidium repetitum (Schulz, 1906)
- Pseudoanthidium reticulatum (Mocsáry, 1884)
- Pseudoanthidium rhombiferum (Friese, 1917)
- Pseudoanthidium rotundiventre (Pasteels, 1987)
- Pseudoanthidium sakaniense (Cockerell, 1936)
- Pseudoanthidium scapulare (Latreille, 1809)
- Pseudoanthidium serratocaudatum (Gupta, Sharma & Simlote, 1993)
- Pseudoanthidium sjoestedti (Friese, 1909)
- Pseudoanthidium soliferum (Cockerell, 1911)
- Pseudoanthidium stigmaticorne Dours, 1873
- Pseudoanthidium tanganyicola (Strand, 1911)
- Pseudoanthidium tenellum (Mocsáry, 1881)
- Pseudoanthidium tergofasciatum (Pasteels, 1984)
- Pseudoanthidium tertium (Pasteels, 1984)
- Pseudoanthidium truncatum (Smith, 1854)
- Pseudoanthidium tuberculiferum (Brauns, 1905)
- Pseudoanthidium variabile (Pasteels, 1980)
- Pseudoanthidium wahrmanicum (Mavromoustakis, 1953)
- Pseudoanthidium xinjiangense (Wu, 2004)
- Pseudoanthidium yanruae Niu & Zhu, 2021
