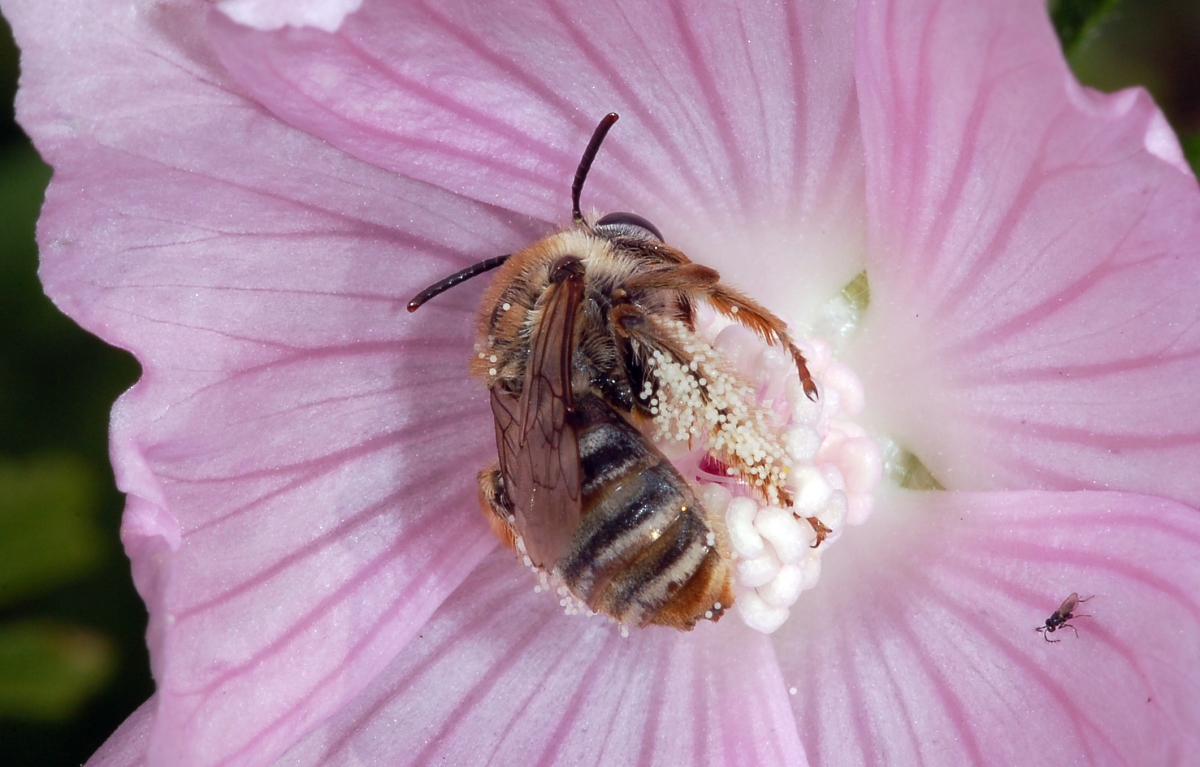

Scientific classification
- Kingdom: Animalia
- Phylum: Arthropoda
- Class: Insecta
- Order: Hymenoptera
- Family: Apidae
- Subfamily: Apinae
- Tribe: Eucerini
- Genus: Tetralonia; Spinola, 1839

= Tetralonia =

Genus of insects

Tetralonia is a genus of insects belonging to the family Apidae.

The genus has almost cosmopolitan distribution.

Species:

- Tetralonia albida (Lepeletier, 1841)
- Tetralonia amoena Walker, 1871
- Tetralonia berlandi Theobald, 1937
- Tetralonia boharti (Eardley, 1989)
- Tetralonia caelebs Dours, 1873
- Tetralonia caudata Friese, 1905
- Tetralonia cinctula Cockerell, 1936
- Tetralonia claripennis Cameron, 1909
- Tetralonia coangustata Dours, 1873
- Tetralonia commixtana Strand, 1913
- Tetralonia costaricensis Friese, 1917
- Tetralonia fraterna Friese, 1911
- Tetralonia fumida (Cockerell, 1911)
- Tetralonia gossypii Cockerell, 1931
- Tetralonia himalayensis Binham, 1897
- Tetralonia invaria Walker, 1871
- Tetralonia krishna Dover, 1925
- Tetralonia labrosa Friese, 1911
- Tetralonia lorenzicola Strand, 1910
- Tetralonia luteipes Friese, 1908
- Tetralonia macroceps Engel & Baker, 2006
- Tetralonia macrognatha (Gerstäcker, 1870)
- Tetralonia malvae (Rossi, 1790)
- Tetralonia mesotes (Eardley, 1989)
- Tetralonia nigropilosa Friese, 1911
- Tetralonia obscuriceps Friese, 1916
- Tetralonia obscuripes Friese, 1905
- Tetralonia paulyi (Eardley, 1989)
- Tetralonia penicillata(Friese, 1905)
- Tetralonia pitarakha Dover, 1925
- Tetralonia planiventris Friese, 1917
- Tetralonia pruinosa Cameron, 1909
- Tetralonia punctilabris Cameron, 1909
- Tetralonia punjaubensis Cameron, 1909
- Tetralonia ruficollis (Friese, 1911)
- Tetralonia rufolineata Cameron, 1909
- Tetralonia testacea Smith, 1854
- Tetralonia testaceitarsis Cameron, 1909
- Tetralonia trichardti Cockerell, 1933
- Tetralonia vetusta Walker, 1871
- Tetralonia wickwari (Bingham, 1908)
