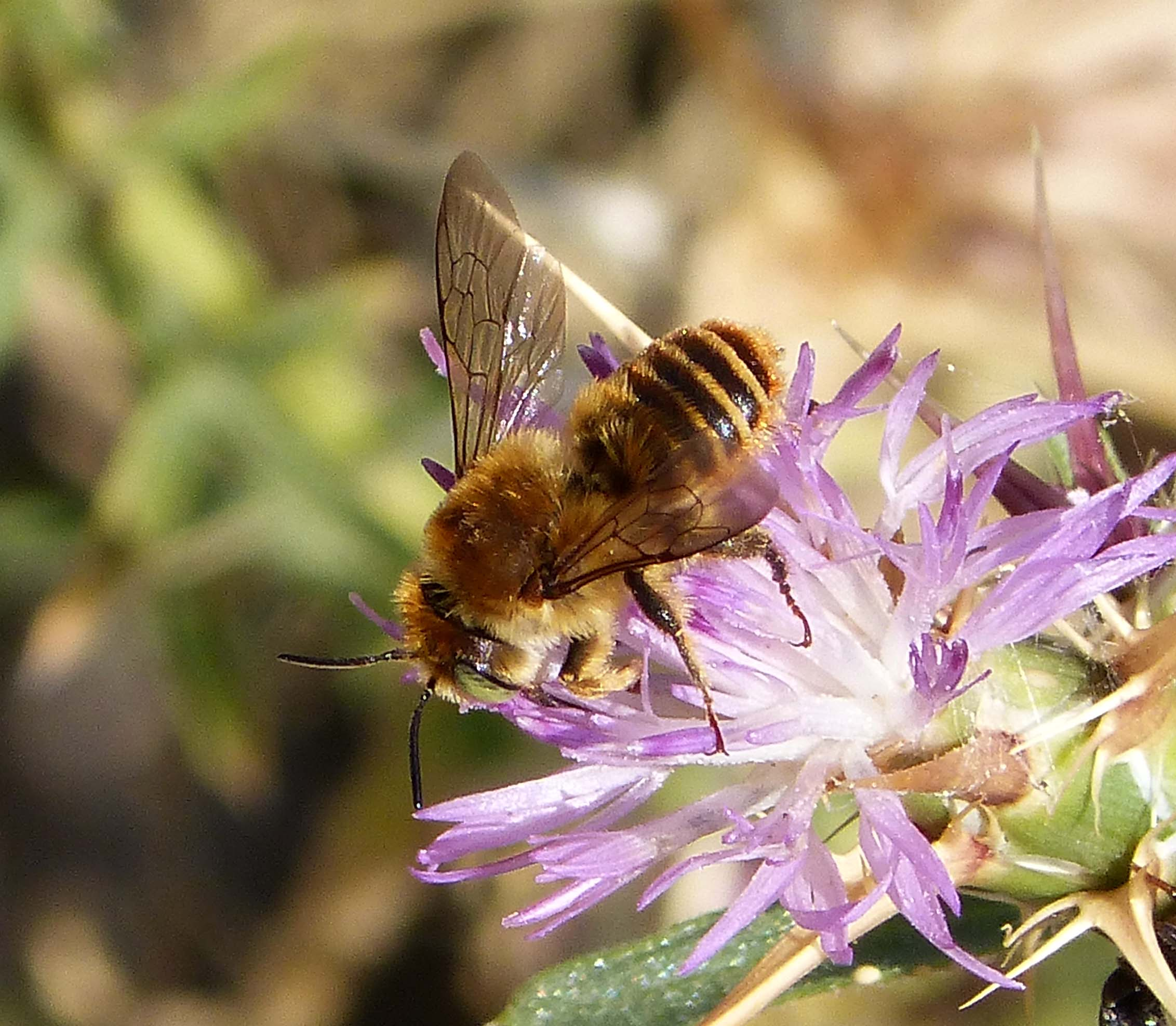

Scientific classification
- Domain: Eukaryota
- Kingdom: Animalia
- Phylum: Arthropoda
- Class: Insecta
- Order: Hymenoptera
- Family: Megachilidae
- Genus: Lithurgus
- Species: L. chrysurus

Binomial name
- Lithurgus chrysurus Fonscolombe, 1834

= Lithurgus chrysurus =

Species of bee

Lithurgus chrysurus, the Mediterranean wood-boring bee, is a species of woodborer bee in the family of Megachilidae.
