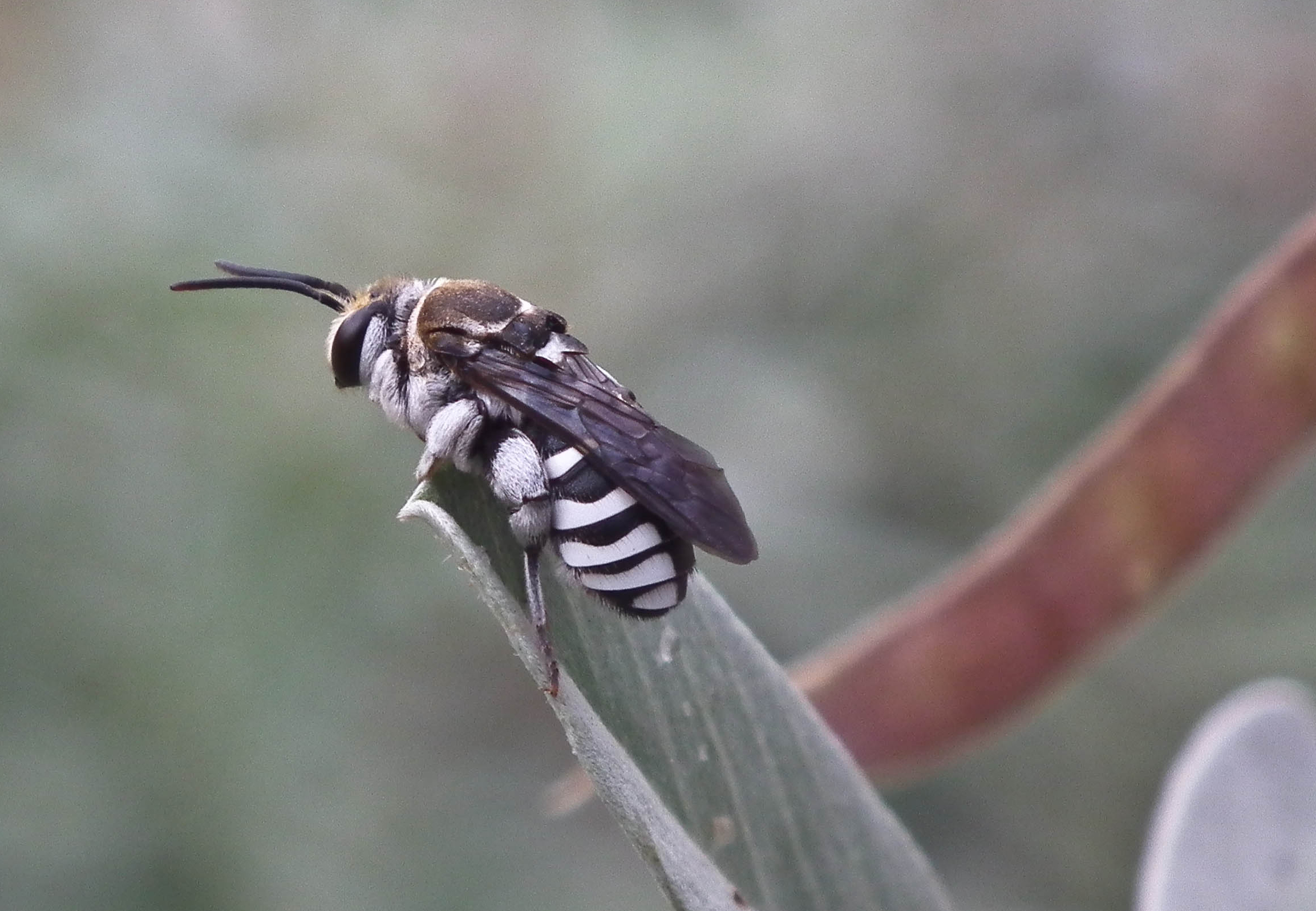
- Pseudapis nilotica

Scientific classification
- Domain: Eukaryota
- Kingdom: Animalia
- Phylum: Arthropoda
- Class: Insecta
- Order: Hymenoptera
- Family: Halictidae
- Genus: Pseudapis; Kirby, 1900

= Pseudapis =

Genus of bees

Pseudapis is a genus of bees belonging to the family Halictidae.

The species of this genus are found in Eurasia and Africa.

Species:

- Pseudapis aculeata (Cockerell, 1931)
- Pseudapis albidula (Friese, 1930)
- Pseudapis albolobata (Cockerell, 1911)
- Pseudapis algeriensis (Warncke, 1976)
- Pseudapis aliceae (Cockerell, 1935)
- Pseudapis aliena (Cameron, 1898)
- Pseudapis amoenula (Gerstäcker, 1870)
- Pseudapis ampla (Walker, 1871)
- Pseudapis anatolica (Warncke, 1976)
- Pseudapis anomala W.F.Kirby, 1900
- Pseudapis anthidioides (Gerstäcker, 1857)
- Pseudapis armata (Olivier, 1812)
- Pseudapis bispinosa (Brullé, 1832)
- Pseudapis bytinski (Warncke, 1976)
- Pseudapis carcharodonta (Baker, 2002)
- Pseudapis cinerea (Friese, 1930)
- Pseudapis diversipes (Latreille, 1806)
- Pseudapis dixica (Warncke, 1976)
- Pseudapis duplocincta (Vachal, 1897)
- Pseudapis edentata (Morawitz, 1876)
- Pseudapis elegantissima (Popov, 1949)
- Pseudapis enecta (Cockerell, 1911)
- Pseudapis equestris (Gerstäcker, 1872)
- Pseudapis fayumensis Baker, 2002
- Pseudapis femoralis (Pallas, 1773)
- Pseudapis flavicarpa (Vachal, 1903)
- Pseudapis flavolobata (Cockerell, 1911)
- Pseudapis fugax (Morawitz, 1877)
- Pseudapis gabonensis (Pauly, 1990)
- Pseudapis glabriventris (Friese, 1930)
- Pseudapis illepida (Walker, 1871)
- Pseudapis inermis (Morawitz, 1895)
- Pseudapis innesi (Gribodo, 1894)
- Pseudapis interstitinervis (Strand, 1912)
- Pseudapis kenyensis Pauly, 1990
- Pseudapis kingi (Cockerell, 1931)
- Pseudapis kophenes (Baker, 2002)
- Pseudapis lobata (Olivier, 1812)
- Pseudapis mandschurica (Hedicke, 1940)
- Pseudapis megacantha (Cockerell, 1916)
- Pseudapis monstrosa (Costa, 1861)
- Pseudapis nilotica (Smith, 1875)
- Pseudapis nubica (Warncke, 1976)
- Pseudapis ocracea Pauly, 1990
- Pseudapis opacula (Cockerell, 1920)
- Pseudapis oxybeloides (Smith, 1875)
- Pseudapis pallicornis (Walker, 1871)
- Pseudapis pandeana (Strand, 1914)
- Pseudapis patellata (Magretti, 1884)
- Pseudapis platula (Warncke, 1976)
- Pseudapis punctata (Cameron, 1905)
- Pseudapis punctiventris (Cockerell, 1935)
- Pseudapis punctiventris (Pauly)
- Pseudapis rhodocantha (Cockerell)
- Pseudapis riftensis Pauly, 1990
- Pseudapis riftinensis Pauly, 1990
- Pseudapis rufescens (Morawitz, 1876)
- Pseudapis rugiventris (Friese, 1930)
- Pseudapis sangaensis (Pauly, 1990)
- Pseudapis schubotzi (Strand, 1911)
- Pseudapis semlikiana (Cockerell, 1935)
- Pseudapis siamensis (Cockerell, 1929)
- Pseudapis squamata (Morawitz, 1895)
- Pseudapis stenotarsus Baker, 2002
- Pseudapis sudanica (Warncke, 1980)
- Pseudapis tadzhica (Popov, 1956)
- Pseudapis tobiasi Astafurova, 2004
- Pseudapis trigonotarsis (He & Wu, 1990)
- Pseudapis tshibindica (Cockerell, 1935)
- Pseudapis uelleburgensis (Strand, 1912)
- Pseudapis umtalica (Cockerell, 1935)
- Pseudapis unidentata (Olivier, 1811)
- Pseudapis urfana (Warncke, 1980)
- Pseudapis usakoa (Cockerell, 1939)
- Pseudapis usambarae Pauly, 1990
- Pseudapis valga (Gerstäcker, 1872)
