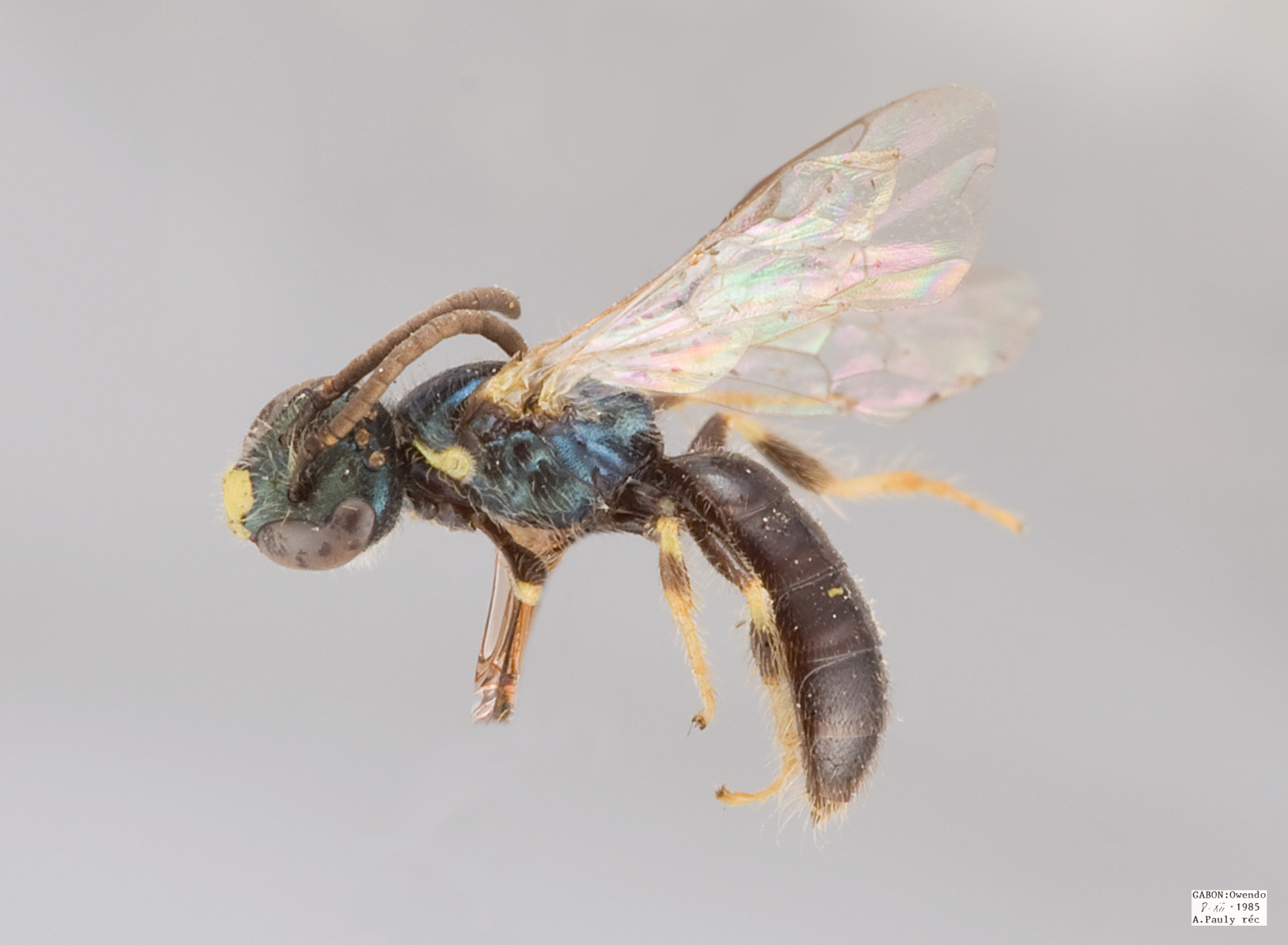

Scientific classification
- Kingdom: Animalia
- Phylum: Arthropoda
- Clade: Pancrustacea
- Class: Insecta
- Order: Hymenoptera
- Family: Halictidae
- Genus: Ceylalictus; Strand, 1913

Type species
- Halictus horni Strand, 1913

= Ceylalictus =

Genus of insects

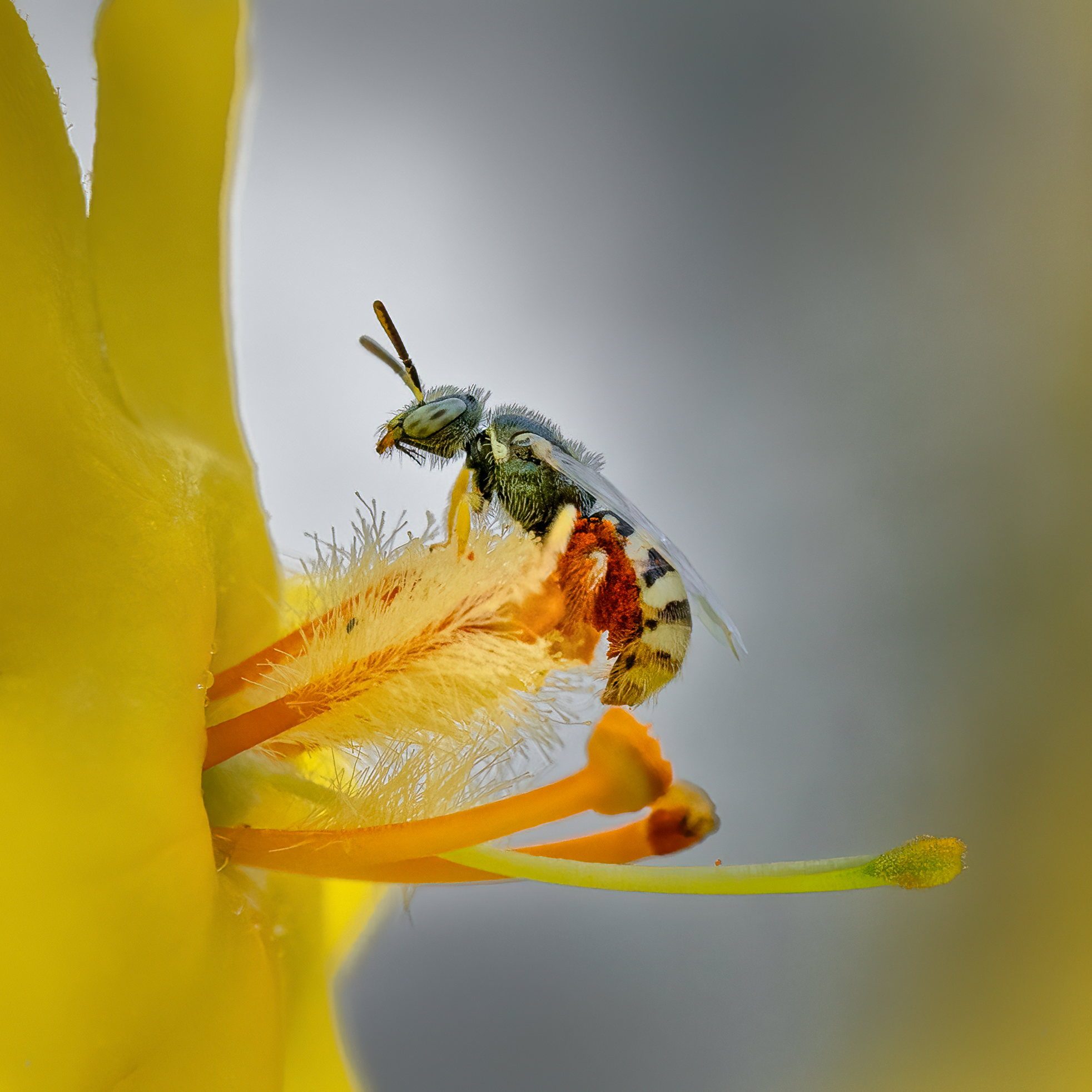
Ceylalictus variegatus - female

Ceylalictus is a genus of bees belonging to the family Halictidae. Type species is Ceylalictus horni, which was originally described as Halictus horni.

The genus has almost cosmopolitan distribution (except America).

Species:

- Ceylalictus aldabranus (Cockerell, 1912)
- Ceylalictus appendiculatus (Cameron, 1903)
- Ceylalictus borneanus (Blüthgen, 1934)
- Ceylalictus capverdensis Pesenko, Pauly & LaRoche, 2002
- Ceylalictus celebensis (Blüthgen, 1935)
- Ceylalictus cereus (Nurse, 1902)
- Ceylalictus congoensis Pesenko & Pauly, 2005
- Ceylalictus dapitanellus (Cockerell, 1915)
- Ceylalictus desertorum (Blüthgen, 1925)
- Ceylalictus formosicola Strand, 1913
- Ceylalictus grandior Pesenko, Pauly & LaRoche, 2002
- Ceylalictus hainanicus W.u.Pesenko, 1991
- Ceylalictus halictoides (Blüthgen, 1925)
- Ceylalictus hedickei (Blüthgen, 1925)
- Ceylalictus horni (Strand, 1913)
- Ceylalictus inornatus (Blüthgen, 1935)
- Ceylalictus karachensis (Cockerell, 1911)
- Ceylalictus madagassus (Blüthgen, 1934)
- Ceylalictus malayensis (Blüthgen, 1934)
- Ceylalictus muiri (Cockerell, 1909)
- Ceylalictus nanensis (Cockerell, 1929)
- Ceylalictus obscurus (Friese, 1914)
- Ceylalictus perditellus (Cockerell, 1905)
- Ceylalictus petiolatus Pesenko, 1996
- Ceylalictus punjabensis (Cameron, 1907)
- Ceylalictus rostratus Pesenko, 1996
- Ceylalictus seistanicus (Blüthgen, 1934)
- Ceylalictus sylvestris Pesenko & Pauly, 2001
- Ceylalictus taprobanae (Cameron, 1897)
- Ceylalictus tumidus Pesenko, 1996
- Ceylalictus valdezi (Cockerell, 1915)
- Ceylalictus variegatus (Olivier, 1789)
- Ceylalictus warnckei Pesenko, 1983
