= Steganomus =

Scientific classification
- Domain: Eukaryota
- Kingdom: Animalia
- Phylum: Arthropoda
- Class: Insecta
- Order: Hymenoptera
- Family: Halictidae
- Genus: Steganomus; Ritsema, 1873

Genus of bees

Steganomus is a genus of bees belonging to the family Halictidae.

The species of this genus are found in Africa and Asia.

Species:

- Steganomus ennediensis Pauly, 1990
- Steganomus fulvipennis Cameron, 1898
- Steganomus gracilis Cameron, 1898
- Steganomus javanus Ritsema, 1873
- Steganomus junodi Gribodo, 1895
- Steganomus lieftincki
- Steganomus nodicornis (Smith, 1875)
- Steganomus ogilviae Cockerell, 1932
- Steganomus taiwanus (Hirashima, 1956)
- Steganomus tessmanni Pauly, 1990
