= Patellapis vincta =

Scientific classification
- Kingdom: Animalia
- Phylum: Arthropoda
- Clade: Pancrustacea
- Class: Insecta
- Order: Hymenoptera
- Family: Halictidae
- Genus: Patellapis
- Species: P. vincta

Binomial name
- Patellapis vincta (Walker, 1860)

Synonyms
- Nomia vincta Walker, 1860; Pachyhalictus (Pachyhalictus) vinctus (Walker, 1860)

Species of bee

Patellapis vincta is a species of bee in the genus Patellapis of the family Halictidae. It is endemic to Sri Lanka. The first specimen was found in the Peradeniya area.
