= Pachyhalictus karunaratnei =

Scientific classification
- Kingdom: Animalia
- Phylum: Arthropoda
- Class: Insecta
- Order: Hymenoptera
- Family: Halictidae
- Genus: Pachyhalictus
- Species: P. karunaratnei

Binomial name
- Pachyhalictus karunaratnei (Cockerell, 1911)

Species of bee

Pachyhalictus karunaratnei is a species of bee in the genus Pachyhalictus, of the family Halictidae. It is endemic to Sri Lanka, specimen was first found from Kalutara district.
