= Lasioglossum alphenum =

Scientific classification
- Domain: Eukaryota
- Kingdom: Animalia
- Phylum: Arthropoda
- Class: Insecta
- Order: Hymenoptera
- Family: Halictidae
- Tribe: Halictini
- Genus: Lasioglossum
- Species: L. alphenum

Binomial name
- Lasioglossum alphenum (Cameron, 1897)

Species of bee

Lasioglossum alphenum, also known as the Lasioglossum (Sudila) alphenum by Sakagami et al. (1996), is a species of bee in the genus Lasioglossum, of the family Halictidae.
