= Megachile albolineata =

Scientific classification
- Domain: Eukaryota
- Kingdom: Animalia
- Phylum: Arthropoda
- Class: Insecta
- Order: Hymenoptera
- Family: Megachilidae
- Genus: Megachile
- Species: M. albolineata

Binomial name
- Megachile albolineata Cameron, 1897

Species of leafcutter bee (Megachile)

Megachile albolineata is a species of bee in the family Megachilidae which was discovered in Cameron in 1897.
