= Tetralonia commixtana =

Scientific classification
- Domain: Eukaryota
- Kingdom: Animalia
- Phylum: Arthropoda
- Class: Insecta
- Order: Hymenoptera
- Family: Apidae
- Genus: Tetralonia
- Subgenus: Thygatina
- Species: T. commixtana

Binomial name
- Tetralonia commixtana Strand, 1913

Species of bee

Tetralonia commixtana, also known as Tetralonia (Thygatina) commixtana, is a species of bee belonging to the family Apidae subfamily Apinae. It is found endemic to Sri Lanka.
