= Tetralonia fumida =

Scientific classification
- Kingdom: Animalia
- Phylum: Arthropoda
- Clade: Pancrustacea
- Class: Insecta
- Order: Hymenoptera
- Family: Apidae
- Genus: Tetralonia
- Species: T. fumida

Binomial name
- Tetralonia fumida (Cockerell, 1911)

Synonyms
- Thygatina fumida Cockerell, 1911

Species of bee

Tetralonia fumida, also known as Tetralonia (Thygatina) fumida, is a species of bee belonging to the Apidae family and Apinae subfamily. It is found endemic to Sri Lanka.
