= Steganomus nodicornis =

Scientific classification
- Domain: Eukaryota
- Kingdom: Animalia
- Phylum: Arthropoda
- Class: Insecta
- Order: Hymenoptera
- Family: Halictidae
- Genus: Steganomus
- Species: S. nodicornis

Binomial name
- Steganomus nodicornis (Smith, 1875)

Species of bee

Steganomus nodicornis is a species of bee in the genus Steganomus, of the family Halictidae.
