= Patellapis kalutarae =

Scientific classification
- Kingdom: Animalia
- Phylum: Arthropoda
- Clade: Pancrustacea
- Class: Insecta
- Order: Hymenoptera
- Family: Halictidae
- Genus: Patellapis
- Species: P. kalutarae

Binomial name
- Patellapis kalutarae (Cockerell, 1911)

Synonyms
- Halictus kalutarae Cockerell, 1911; Halictus amplicollis Friese, 1918; Pachyhalictus (Pachyhalictus) kalutarae (Cockerell, 1911)

Species of bee

Patellapis kalutarae is a species of bee in the family Halictidae. It is endemic to Sri Lanka and was first found in Kalutara District.
