= Pseudoanthidium rotundiventre =

Scientific classification
- Kingdom: Animalia
- Phylum: Arthropoda
- Clade: Pancrustacea
- Class: Insecta
- Order: Hymenoptera
- Family: Megachilidae
- Genus: Pseudoanthidium
- Species: P. rotundiventre

Binomial name
- Pseudoanthidium rotundiventre (Pasteels, 1987)

Synonyms
- Exanthidium rotundiventre Pasteels, 1987

Species of bee

Pseudoanthidium rotundiventre is a species of leaf-cutting bee in the genus Pseudoanthidium, of the family Megachilidae. It is endemic to Sri Lanka.
