= Pseudapis oxybeloides =

Scientific classification
- Kingdom: Animalia
- Phylum: Arthropoda
- Clade: Pancrustacea
- Class: Insecta
- Order: Hymenoptera
- Family: Halictidae
- Genus: Pseudapis
- Species: P. oxybeloides

Binomial name
- Pseudapis oxybeloides (Smith, 1875)

Synonyms
- Nomia oxybeloides Smith, 1875; Nomia latispina Cameron, 1898; Nomia lepidota Cockerell, 1905; Nomia biroi Friese, 1913

Species of bee

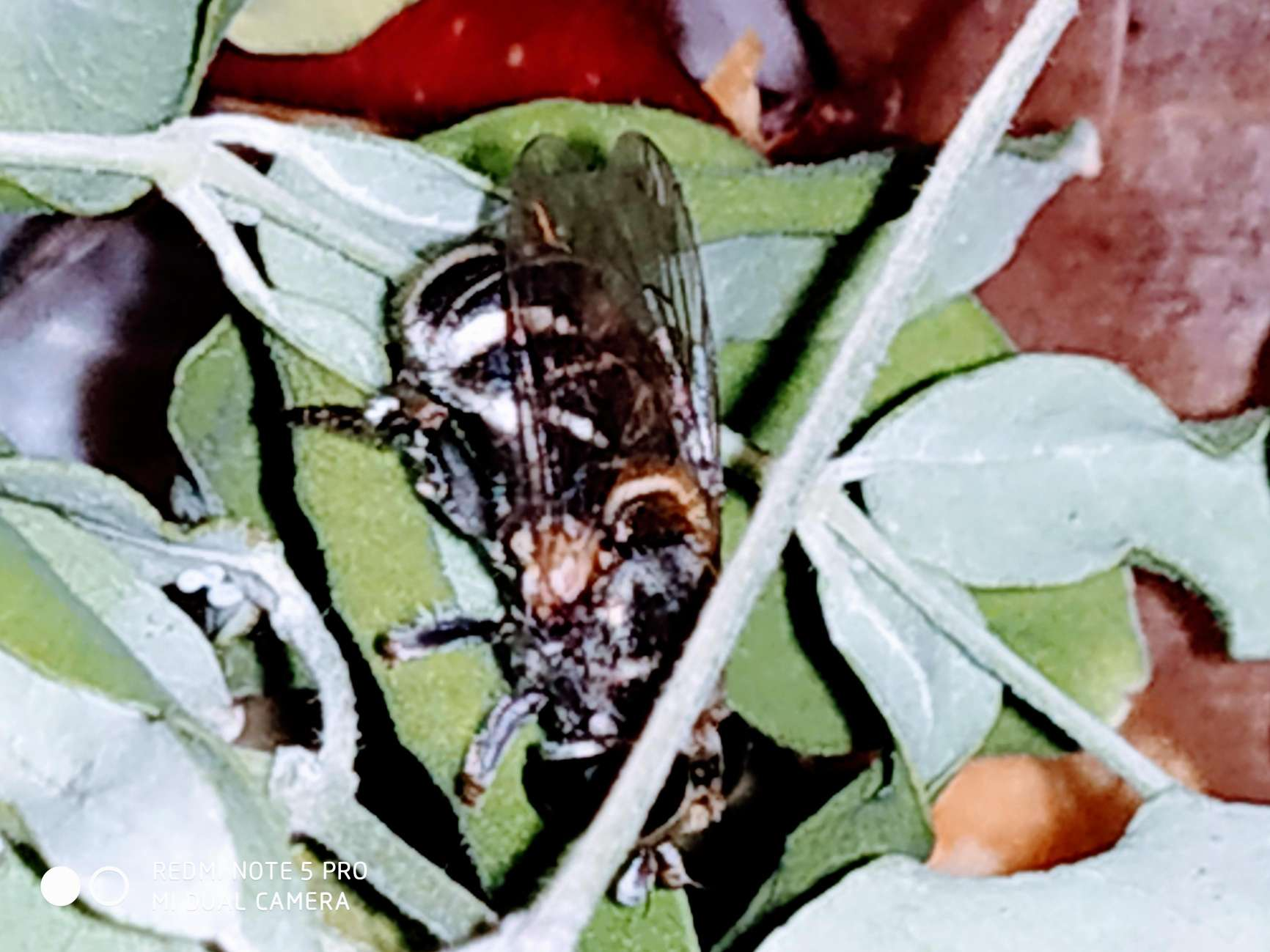
Pseudapis oxybeloides

Pseudapis oxybeloides is a species of soil-nesting bee in the genus Pseudapis. of the family Halictidae, and a major global pollinator.
