= Pseudoanthidium orientale =

Scientific classification
- Domain: Eukaryota
- Kingdom: Animalia
- Phylum: Arthropoda
- Class: Insecta
- Order: Hymenoptera
- Family: Megachilidae
- Genus: Pseudoanthidium
- Species: P. orientale

Binomial name
- Pseudoanthidium orientale (Bingham, 1897)

Synonyms
- Anthidium kryzhanovskii Wu, 1962

Species of bee

Pseudoanthidium orientale is a species of bee in the genus Pseudoanthidium of the family Megachilidae.
