= Lasioglossum carinifrons =

Scientific classification
- Domain: Eukaryota
- Kingdom: Animalia
- Phylum: Arthropoda
- Class: Insecta
- Order: Hymenoptera
- Family: Halictidae
- Tribe: Halictini
- Genus: Lasioglossum
- Species: L. carinifrons

Binomial name
- Lasioglossum carinifrons (Cameron, 1904)

Species of bee

Lasioglossum carinifrons, also known as the Lasioglossum (Evylaeus) carinifrons, is a species of bee in the genus Lasioglossum, of the family Halictidae.
