= Curvinomia iridiscens =

Curvinomia iridescens

Scientific classification
- Kingdom: Animalia
- Phylum: Arthropoda
- Class: Insecta
- Order: Hymenoptera
- Family: Halictidae
- Genus: Curvinomia
- Species: C. iridiscens

Binomial name
- Curvinomia iridiscens (Smith, 1857)

Synonyms
- Nomia iridescens (Westwood) Smith 1853 Nomen nudum.; Nomia iridescens (Westwood) Smith 1857; = Nomia (Paranomia) zebrata Cameron 1902 Syn. nov.; = Nomia (Paranomia) frederici Cameron 1902 Syn. nov.; = Nomia iridescens var. rhodochlora Cockerell 1919 Syn. nov.; = Nomia subpurpurea Cockerell 1920

Species of bee

Curvinomia iridescens is a species of bee in the genus Curvinomia, of the family Halictidae.
