= Lipotriches karnatakaensis =

Scientific classification
- Kingdom: Animalia
- Phylum: Arthropoda
- Class: Insecta
- Order: Hymenoptera
- Family: Halictidae
- Genus: Lipotriches
- Subgenus: Macronomia
- Species: L. karnatakaensis

Binomial name
- Lipotriches karnatakaensis (Pauly, 2009)

Synonyms
- Macronomia karnatakaensis Pauly, 2009

Species of bee

Lipotriches karnatakaensis is a species of bee in the genus Lipotriches, of the family Halictidae.
