= Patellapis sigiriella =

Scientific classification
- Kingdom: Animalia
- Phylum: Arthropoda
- Clade: Pancrustacea
- Class: Insecta
- Order: Hymenoptera
- Family: Halictidae
- Genus: Patellapis
- Species: P. sigiriella

Binomial name
- Patellapis sigiriella (Cockerell, 1911)

Synonyms
- Pachyhalictus (Pachyhalictus) sigiriellus Cockerell, 1928

Species of bee

Patellapis sigiriella is a species of bee in the genus Patellapis, of the family Halictidae. It is endemic to Sri Lanka, specimen was first found from Sigiriya area of Matale District.
