= Lasioglossum vagans =

Scientific classification
- Domain: Eukaryota
- Kingdom: Animalia
- Phylum: Arthropoda
- Class: Insecta
- Order: Hymenoptera
- Family: Halictidae
- Tribe: Halictini
- Genus: Lasioglossum
- Species: L. vagans

Binomial name
- Lasioglossum vagans (Smith, 1857)

Species of bee

Lasioglossum vagans, also known as the Lasioglossum (Ctenomia) vagans, is a species of bee in the family Halictidae.
