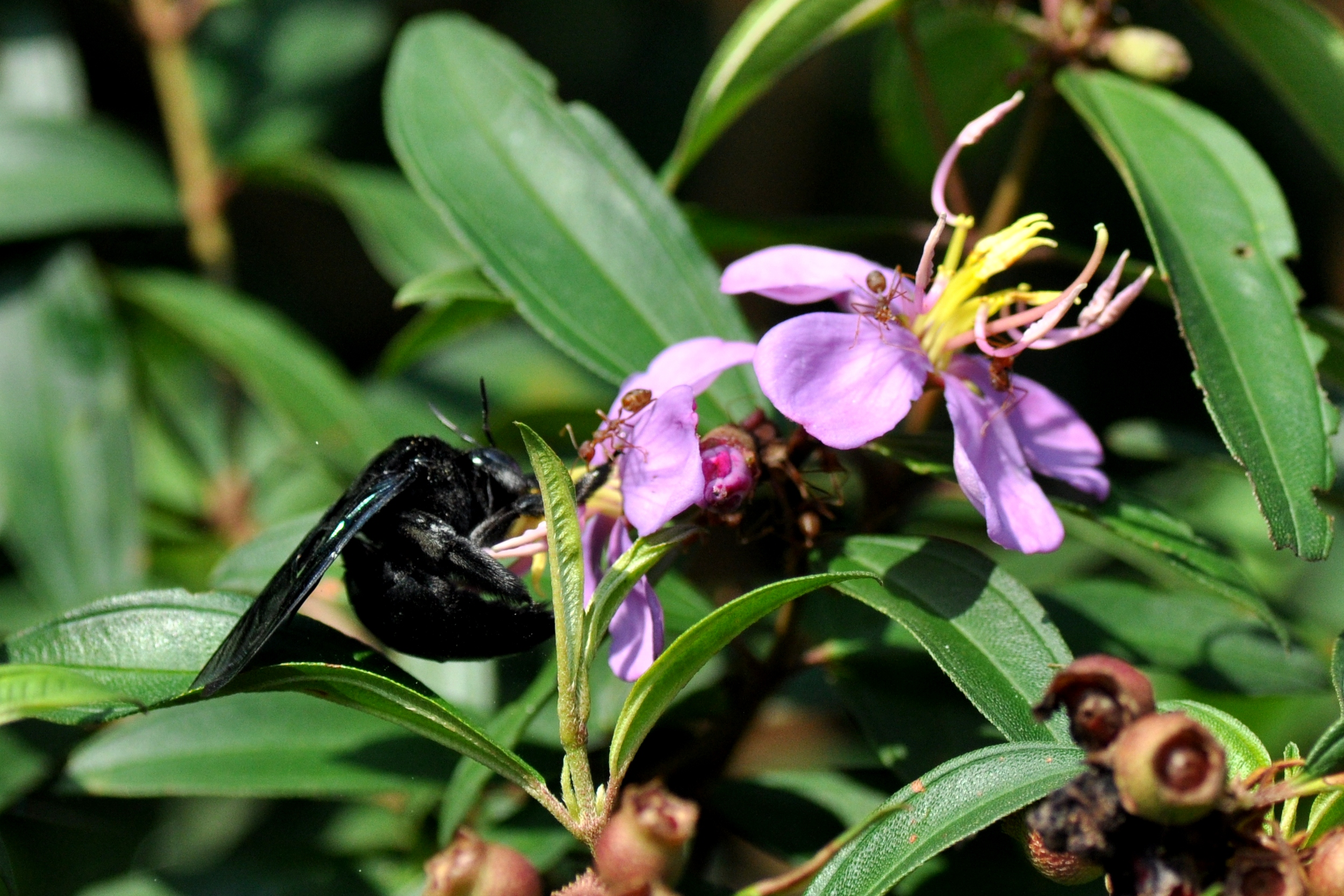
- X. nasalis feeding on Singaporean rhododendron

Scientific classification
- Kingdom: Animalia
- Phylum: Arthropoda
- Class: Insecta
- Order: Hymenoptera
- Family: Apidae
- Genus: Xylocopa
- Species: X. nasalis

Binomial name
- Xylocopa nasalis Westwood, 1838

Synonyms
- Xylocopa dissimilis Lepeletier, 1841; Xylocopa lunulata Lepeletier, 1841; Xylocopa minensis Cockerell, 1909

= Xylocopa nasalis =

Species of bee

The Oriental carpenter bee, Xylocopa nasalis, or Xylocopa (Biluna) nasalis, is a species of carpenter bee. It is widely distributed in Southeast Asian countries. It is a major pollinator within its ecosystem, and is often mistaken for a bumblebee. The species leads a solitary lifestyle with a highly female-biased colony in the nest.

== Taxonomy and phylogeny ==
Xylocopa nasalis is a member of the genus Xylocopa, first described in 1802 by French entomologist Pierre André Latreille. The genus name is derived from Ancient Greek and translates to ¨wood-cutter.¨ Xylocopa is comprised specifically of carpenter bees, who build their nests in burrows in dead wood, bamboo, or structural timbers. The genus is also related to the genus of Ceratina, which are referred to as ¨small carpenter bees."

== Description and identification ==
Easily mistaken for bumble bees, carpenter bees of X. nasalis are relatively large, with a sturdy, black, lustrous body. Their thorax can exceed 5 mm in length, and some have yellow markings on their head.

The front wing marginal cell is thin and stretched, while the apex, the anterior corner of the wing, leans away from the costa, which is the leading edge of the wing. Moreover, the front wing also has small stigma cells. Short mandibles cover the labral flap of the bee when the mandibles are closed.

X. nasalis have compound eyes, which can consist of thousands of individual photoreceptor units. The image produced for this species of bees is a systematic collaboration of the numerous inputs received from the photoreceptors. These kinds of eyes can view in large angles and are able to detect rapid movement.

The eggs of X. nasalis are very large relative to the size of females and are known to be some of the largest eggs among all insects.

=== Male female dimorphism ===
Males have a white or yellow face, while the females do not have these characteristics. Moreover, males often have much larger eyes than the females. Males do not contain a stinger, while the females are capable of using their stingers, but rarely do unless directly provoked or in immediate danger.

== Distribution and habitat ==
X. nasalis is a common carpenter bee found in Southeast Asia, predominantly in tropic and subtropic regions such as Thailand, Vietnam, West Malaysia, and Singapore.

=== Nest ===
Nests of Xylocopa nasalis are strictly unbranched and the provisioned cells are separated by distinct partitions made from bamboo shreds excavated by the founding female. Usually, the nest entrances are located mainly at the end of the bamboo culms, but there can be excavation from the underside for an entrance.

The average total nest length is 38.35 cm and the average nest length (from the nest entrance to the end of the innermost partitioned cell) is about 25.40 cm. The number of cells partitioned per nest is between zero and eight cells, with an average of about three per nest.

=== Nest population ===
On average, there can be anywhere from 1 to 7 individual adult bees in an X. nasalis nest, with a female-biased sex-ratio of 8:1. In a given nest, sister bees can tolerate and live inside the same nest with up to 7 individuals along with their mother.

== Colony cycle ==
X. nasalis carpenter bees hibernate in their nest's tunnels during the winter and leave to mate in the spring. In addition to mating, these bees will use spring to excavate, clean, enlarge, and alter tunnels in their nest for new incoming eggs. Within the chambers of the nest, a mixture of pollen and regurgitated nectar is portioned as a food supply for the brood. An egg is deposited on top of each food supply in each chamber and then the chamber is sealed off. Once the eggs hatch into larvae, they remain in their nest chambers to complete their development and pupate. In August, the newly developed adult carpenter bees leave their nests, feed on nectar, and then return to the tunnels once winter arrives for the next cycle.

== Behavior ==
=== Nesting ===
X. nasalis is known to be a solitary bee; however, as seen in the case of X. nasalis, some species of the genus Xylocopa have simple social nests in which the mothers and daughters may co-inhabit. In this nest situation, a division of labor is implemented between the females. Duties include guarding near the entrance of the nest and foraging for food.

==== Nest creation ====
X. nasalis use their mandibles to grind away at wood while they bodies vibrate, creating an entrance tunnel into the wood. However, carpenter bees do not eat wood; they will usually throw away the bits of shredded wood or reuse the bits to create walls within the tunneling nests. The tunnel is integral in storage for pollen, nursing the brood, and protecting the brood.

==== Nest competition ====
Competition for nests is seen frequently in this species of bee, regardless of whether there is an abundance of resources for building the nest. Sometimes, X. nasalis females need to protect their nests by blocking or obstructing the entrance of her nest. The most common defense posture is that of a female blocking the entrance with her head; sometimes, the female will also use her metasoma to block the entrance.

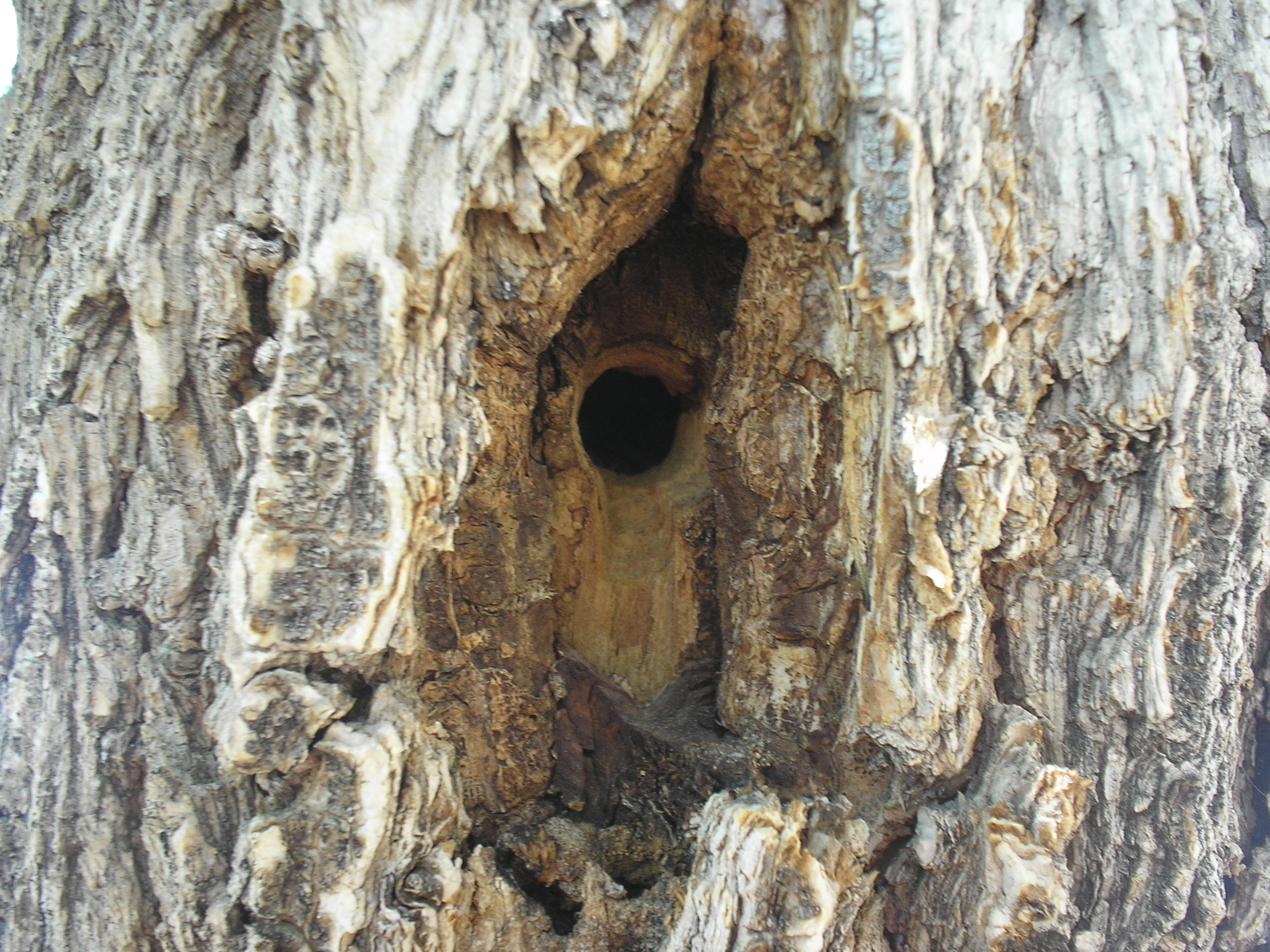
Entrance of nest

=== Foraging ===
X. nasalis displays polylecty and a broad host plant range when foraging for pollen. X. nasalis is known to forage for at least 14 different pollen types for the construction of pollen masses. Some of these pollen types come from Lithocarpus, Castanopsis, S. siamea, Trapa, Schima, and Croton. The bees' foraging behavior builds, stores, or catches foods such as nectar and pollen. These are used to feed and expand the colony.

=== Mating ===
In the mating system of X. nasalis, the males search for females by flying around areas that females fly within and waiting for a specific female to pursue. It has also been documented that males may release pheromones into the air from their glandular reservoir in the mesosoma to attract females for reproduction.

=== Communication ===
Like almost all other bee species, X. nasalis communicates mainly by dancing, which can communicate information to nearby bees. Information can include the location of provisions, danger warnings, and mating rituals.

== Predators ==
Woodpeckers are known to prey on X. nasalis. Woodpeckers are attracted to the bee larvae sounds within the nest, and will drill holes with their beaks along the tunnels to reach the larvae.

Two species of flies, diptera and bombyliidae, are known to also prey on carpenter bees. These species of flies lay eggs at the entrance of a nest. Once the eggs become maggots, the maggots prey off the bee larvae, with little to no investment for the parent flies.

== Ecosystem role ==
The prominent ecological role of X. nasalis is to be a mass pollinator of a myriad of plant hosts. X. nasalis plays a positive role in the ecosystem and in humanity, as they pollinate innumerable plant species, such as crops, flowers, and other flora.

However, since they aid in the disintegration of wood, they do have a negative influence in everyday life. Although the damage to wood from a single bee is slight, the year-to-year damage done by many generations of the oriental carpenter bee can cause considerable structural damage to wooden structures, such as doors, window sills, roof eaves, shingles, railings, telephone poles, and even wooden lawn furniture.

== Conservation status ==
Like most bees, X. nasalis is a major pollinator of subtropic and tropic areas. However, it is in a population decline. Therefore, it is still in need of conservation efforts, but it is not an endangered species or even a threatened one.
