= Megachile ceylonica =

Scientific classification
- Domain: Eukaryota
- Kingdom: Animalia
- Phylum: Arthropoda
- Class: Insecta
- Order: Hymenoptera
- Family: Megachilidae
- Genus: Megachile
- Species: M. ceylonica

Binomial name
- Megachile ceylonica Bingham, 1896

Species of leafcutter bee (Megachile)

Megachile ceylonica is a species of bee in the family Megachilidae. It was described by Charles Thomas Bingham in 1896.
