= Ceylalictus horni =

Scientific classification
- Kingdom: Animalia
- Phylum: Arthropoda
- Clade: Pancrustacea
- Class: Insecta
- Order: Hymenoptera
- Family: Halictidae
- Genus: Ceylalictus
- Species: C. horni

Binomial name
- Ceylalictus horni (Strand, 1913)

Species of bee

Ceylalictus horni is a species of bee in the genus Ceylalictus, of the family Halictidae.
