= Ceylalictus taprobanae =

Scientific classification
- Kingdom: Animalia
- Phylum: Arthropoda
- Clade: Pancrustacea
- Class: Insecta
- Order: Hymenoptera
- Family: Halictidae
- Genus: Ceylalictus
- Species: C. taprobanae

Binomial name
- Ceylalictus taprobanae (Cameron, 1897)

Species of bee

Ceylalictus taprobanae is a species of bee in the genus Ceylalictus, of the family Halictidae.
