= Lasioglossum kandiense =

Scientific classification
- Kingdom: Animalia
- Phylum: Arthropoda
- Class: Insecta
- Order: Hymenoptera
- Family: Halictidae
- Tribe: Halictini
- Genus: Lasioglossum
- Species: L. kandiense

Binomial name
- Lasioglossum kandiense (Strand, 1913)

Species of bee

Lasioglossum kandiense, also known as the Lasioglossum (Sudila) kandiense, is a species of bee in the family Halictidae.
