= Ceylalictus cereus =

Scientific classification
- Kingdom: Animalia
- Phylum: Arthropoda
- Clade: Pancrustacea
- Class: Insecta
- Order: Hymenoptera
- Family: Halictidae
- Genus: Ceylalictus
- Species: C. cereus

Binomial name
- Ceylalictus cereus (Nurse, 1902)

Species of bee

Ceylalictus cereus is a species of bee in the genus Ceylalictus, of the family Halictidae.
