= Tetraloniella taprobanicola =

Scientific classification
- Domain: Eukaryota
- Kingdom: Animalia
- Phylum: Arthropoda
- Class: Insecta
- Order: Hymenoptera
- Family: Apidae
- Genus: Tetraloniella
- Species: T. taprobanicola

Binomial name
- Tetraloniella taprobanicola (Strand, 1913)

Synonyms
- Tetralonia taprobanicola Strand, 1913

Species of bee

Tetraloniella taprobanicola, also known as Tetraloniella (Tetraloniella) taprobanicola, is a species of bee belonging to the family Apidae subfamily Apinae. It is found endemic to Sri Lanka.
