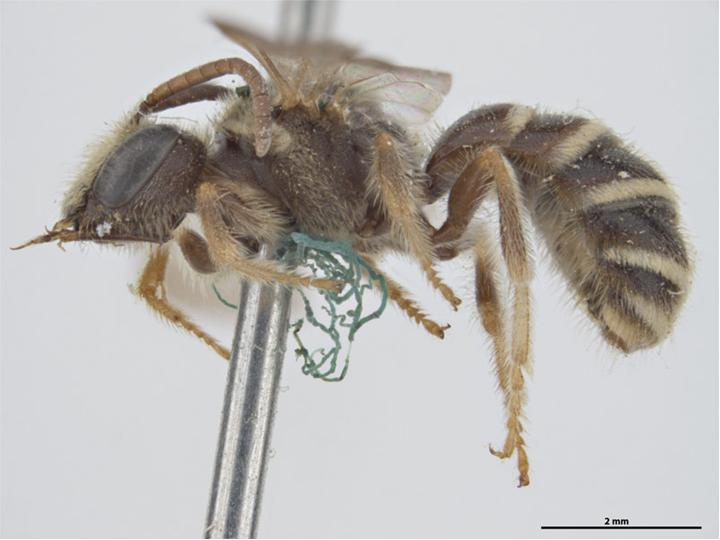

Scientific classification
- Kingdom: Animalia
- Phylum: Arthropoda
- Clade: Pancrustacea
- Class: Insecta
- Order: Hymenoptera
- Family: Halictidae
- Genus: Lasioglossum
- Species: L. halictoides

Binomial name
- Lasioglossum halictoides (Smith, 1858)

= Lasioglossum halictoides =

Species of bee

Lasioglossum halictoides, also known as the Lasioglossum (Nesohalictus) halictoides, is a species of bee in the genus Lasioglossum, of the family Halictidae.
