= Lasioglossum paradnanum =

Scientific classification
- Kingdom: Animalia
- Phylum: Arthropoda
- Clade: Pancrustacea
- Class: Insecta
- Order: Hymenoptera
- Family: Halictidae
- Genus: Lasioglossum
- Species: L. paradnanum

Binomial name
- Lasioglossum paradnanum (Strand, 1913)

Synonyms
- Halictus paradnanus Strand, 1913; Homalictus paradnanus (Strand, 1913)

Species of bee

Lasioglossum paradnanum, is a species of bee in the genus Lasioglossum, of the family Halictidae.
