= Kotam =

- Municipality
- Location within Azerbaijan
- Coordinates: 38°54′N 46°04′E
- Country: Azerbaijan
- Autonomous republic: Nakhchivan
- District: Ordubad

Population (2005)
  - Total: 394
- Time zone: UTC+4 (AZT)

Kotam (until 2003, Ketam) is a village and municipality in the Ordubad District of Nakhchivan, Azerbaijan. It is located in the north of the Nakhchivan-Baku railway, 5 km in the south-east from the district center. Its population is busy with gardening and animal husbandry. There are secondary school, club, library and a medical center in the village. It has a population of 394.

== Etymology ==
Kotam کتام is a Gilaki/Persian word meaning a hut-like shelter raised on the farmland to protect the farmers from the sun and rain, sort of northern Iranian Cabana. This word is used in many places in northern Iran and adjacent area.

According to some guesses, the name of the village could also be related with the name of the mountain of Ketam. Some researchers consider that the name is a distorted option of the toponym of Kuhitam and explains it as a combination of the words of kuh (mountain) in Iranian languages and tam//dam (home, building, fence) in Turkic languages, in meaning as "the mountain which is their home, building". In the Turkic languages, the words of kat / ket /kot / köt / kut / küt are used in meaning "low height", "short", "fat", "heap, pile", "device", "wealth", and suffix -am is the word-building. In this regard, the name of the mountain can be explained as "the low height mountain", "hill".
