= Patellapis bedana =

Scientific classification
- Kingdom: Animalia
- Phylum: Arthropoda
- Clade: Pancrustacea
- Class: Insecta
- Order: Hymenoptera
- Family: Halictidae
- Genus: Patellapis
- Species: P. bedana

Binomial name
- Patellapis bedana (Blüthgen, 1926)

Synonyms
- Halictus bedanus Blüthgen, 1926; Pachyhalictus bedanus (Blüthgen, 1926)

Species of bee

Patellapis bedana is a species of bee in the genus Patellapis, of the family Halictidae.
