= Ceylalictus appendiculatus =

Scientific classification
- Kingdom: Animalia
- Phylum: Arthropoda
- Clade: Pancrustacea
- Class: Insecta
- Order: Hymenoptera
- Family: Halictidae
- Genus: Ceylalictus
- Species: C. appendiculatus

Binomial name
- Ceylalictus appendiculatus (Cameron, 1903)

Synonyms
- Ceratina appendiculata Cameron, 1903

Species of bee

Ceylalictus appendiculatus is a species of bee in the genus Ceylalictus, of the family Halictidae.
