= Lasioglossum bidentatum =

Scientific classification
- Kingdom: Animalia
- Phylum: Arthropoda
- Class: Insecta
- Order: Hymenoptera
- Family: Halictidae
- Tribe: Halictini
- Genus: Lasioglossum
- Species: L. bidentatum

Binomial name
- Lasioglossum bidentatum (Cameron, 1898)

Species of bee

Lasioglossum bidentatum, also known as the Lasioglossum (Sudila) bidentatum, is a species of bee in the genus Lasioglossum, of the family Halictidae. The species is mispellingly known as specific name bidendatum in some books.
