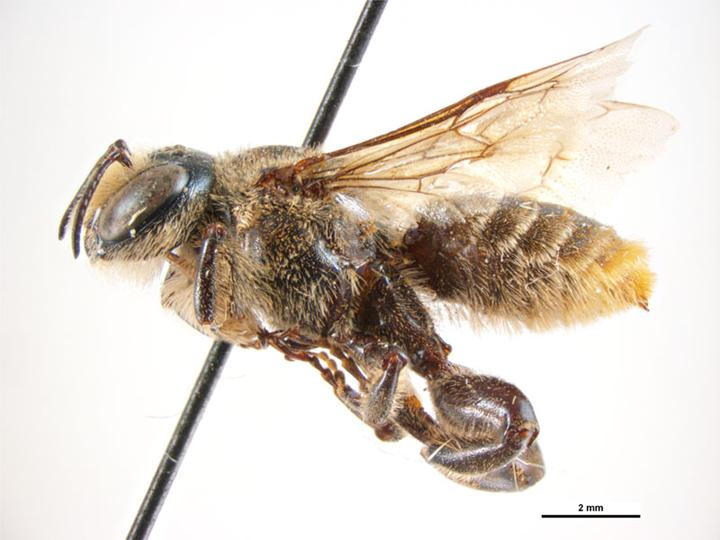

Scientific classification
- Domain: Eukaryota
- Kingdom: Animalia
- Phylum: Arthropoda
- Class: Insecta
- Order: Hymenoptera
- Family: Megachilidae
- Genus: Lithurgus
- Species: L. atratus

Binomial name
- Lithurgus atratus Smith, 1853

= Lithurgus atratus =

Species of bee

Lithurgus atratus is a species of bee in the family Megachilidae, the mason bees. It is a pollinator of okra in Sri Lanka. It is a host of Chaetodactylus ludwigi, a bee mite.
