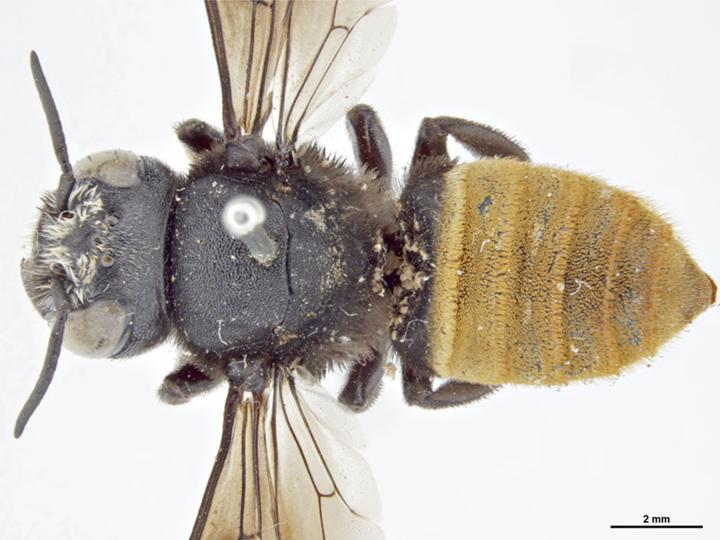
- Female

Scientific classification
- Kingdom: Animalia
- Phylum: Arthropoda
- Class: Insecta
- Order: Hymenoptera
- Family: Megachilidae
- Genus: Megachile
- Species: M. mystacea

Binomial name
- Megachile mystacea (Fabricius, 1775)

= Megachile mystacea =

Species of leafcutter bee (Megachile)

Megachile mystacea is a species of bee in the family Megachilidae. It was described by Johan Christian Fabricius in 1775.
