= List of Pseudopanurgus species =

This is a list of 32 species in Pseudopanurgus, a subgenus of mining bees in the family Andrenidae.

== Pseudopanurgus species ==
- Protandrena aethiops Linnaeus, 1758^{i c g b}
- Protandrena cameroni (Baker, 1906)^{i c g}
- Protandrena cazieri Timberlake, 1973^{i c g}
- Protandrena compacta Timberlake, 1973^{i c g}
- Protandrena crenulata (Cockerell, 1905)^{i c g}
- Protandrena dicksoni Timberlake, 1967^{i c g}
- Protandrena fratercula (Cockerell, 1896)^{i c g b}
- Protandrena fuliginosa Timberlake, 1973^{i c g}
- Protandrena fulvicornis Timberlake, 1973^{i c g}
- Protandrena fuscicornis Timberlake, 1973^{i c g}
- Protandrena mexicana (Cresson, 1878)^{i c g}
- Protandrena opacella (Cockerell, 1949)^{i c g}
- Protandrena pectidella Cockerell, 1904^{i c g}
- Protandrena pectiphila (Cockerell, 1913)^{i c g}
- Protandrena perarmata Timberlake, 1967^{i c g}
- Protandrena perpunctata Timberlake, 1973^{i c g}
- Protandrena rufosignata Cockerell, 1949^{i c g}
- Protandrena rugosa (Robertson, 1895)^{i c}
- Protandrena scaber (Fox, 1894)^{i c g}
- Protandrena semilevis Timberlake, 1973^{i c g}
- Protandrena subrugosa Timberlake, 1973^{i c g}
- Protandrena tomentosa Timberlake, 1973^{i c g}
- Protandrena townsendi (Cockerell, 1897)^{i c}
- Protandrena tridecis (Timberlake, 1975)^{i c g}
- Protandrena trifasciata Timberlake, 1973^{i c g}
- Protandrena trimaculata Timberlake, 1973^{i c g}
- Protandrena tripogandrae (Timberlake, 1975)^{i c g}
- Protandrena tuberata Timberlake, 1973^{i c g}
- Protandrena velutina Timberlake, 1973^{i c g}
- Protandrena ventralis (Timberlake, 1975)^{i c g}
- Protandrena verticalis Timberlake, 1967^{i c g}
- Protandrena virginica (Cockerell, 1907)^{i c g}

Data sources: i = ITIS, c = Catalogue of Life, g = GBIF, b = Bugguide.net

== Formerly treated as Pseudopanurgus ==
=== Transferred to Protandrena (Anthemurgus) ===
- Protandrena passiflorae (Robertson, 1902)^{i c g}

=== Transferred to Protandrena (Heterosarus) ===
- Protandrena adjuncta Timberlake, 1975^{i c}
- Protandrena amplipennis Timberlake, 1975)^{i c}
- Protandrena arctiventris Timberlake, 1975^{i c g}
- Protandrena aristata Timberlake, 1975^{i c g}
- Protandrena asperata Timberlake, 1975^{i c g}
- Protandrena bakeri Cockerell, 1896^{i c g}
- Protandrena brevis Timberlake, 1975^{i c g}
- Protandrena chemsaki (Timberlake, 1975)^{i c}
- Protandrena clypeata (Timberlake, 1975)^{i c}
- Protandrena congener (Timberlake, 1975)^{i c g}
- Protandrena consors (Timberlake, 1975)^{i c g}
- Protandrena creper (Timberlake, 1975)^{i c g}
- Protandrena dakotensis (Timberlake, 1977)^{i c g}
- Protandrena dawsoni Timberlake, 1964^{i c g}
- Protandrena diparilis (Timberlake, 1975)^{i c g}
- Protandrena dreisbachi (Timberlake, 1975)^{i c}
- Protandrena elongata (Friese, 1917)^{i c g}
- Protandrena eurycephala (Timberlake, 1975)^{i c g}
- Protandrena flavotincta (Cockerell, 1898)^{i c g}
- Protandrena fuscitarsis (Timberlake, 1975)^{i c g}
- Protandrena globiceps (Timberlake, 1975)^{i c g}
- Protandrena gracilis (Timberlake, 1975)^{i c}
- Protandrena humilis (Timberlake, 1975)^{i c}
- Protandrena illinoiensis (Cresson, 1878)^{i c g}
- Protandrena inornata (Timberlake, 1975)^{i c g}
- Protandrena levis (Timberlake, 1975)^{i c g}
- Protandrena leviventris (Timberlake, 1975)^{i c g}
- Protandrena lopeziae (Timberlake, 1975)^{i c g}
- Protandrena lugubris (Timberlake, 1975)^{i c g}
- Protandrena margaritensis (Fox, 1893)^{i c g}
- Protandrena munda (Timberlake, 1975)^{i c}
- Protandrena nanula Timberlake, 1964^{i c g}
- Protandrena neomexicana (Cockerell, 1898)^{i c g}
- Protandrena nitens (Timberlake, 1975)^{i c g}
- Protandrena opacula (Cockerell, 1922)^{i c g}
- Protandrena parva (Robertson, 1892)^{i c g b}
- Protandrena parvula (Friese, 1917)^{i c g}
- Protandrena pauper (Cresson, 1878)^{i c g}
- Protandrena pernitens (Cockerell, 1922)^{i c g}
- Protandrena platycephala (Ruz, 1990)^{i c g}
- Protandrena pleuralis (Timberlake, 1975)^{i c g}
- Protandrena pulchricornis (Cockerell, 1922)^{i c g}
- Protandrena readioi (Michener, 1952)^{i c g}
- Protandrena sculleni (Timberlake, 1975)^{i c g}
- Protandrena setigera (Timberlake, 1977)^{i c g}
- Protandrena subglaber (Timberlake, 1975)^{i c g}
- Protandrena sublevis (Timberlake, 1975)^{i c g}
- Protandrena subopaca Timberlake, 1964^{i c g}
- Protandrena succincta (Timberlake, 1975)^{i c g}

=== Transferred to Protandrena (Pterosarus) ===
- Protandrena aestivalis Provancher, 1882^{i c g}
- Protandrena albitarsis Zetterstedt, 1838^{i c g b}
- Protandrena altissima Cockerell, 1922)^{i c g}
- Protandrena andrenoides Spinola, 1808^{i c g b}
- Protandrena atricornis Grote, 1874^{i c g b}
- Protandrena aurifodinae Michener, 1937^{i c g}
- Protandrena barberi Cockerell, 1899^{i c}
- Protandrena bidentis Cockerell, 1896^{i c g}
- Protandrena boylei Cockerell, 1896^{i c g}
- Protandrena californica Cresson, 1878^{i c g}
- Protandrena citrinifrons (Viereck, 1903)^{i c g}
- Protandrena citripes (Ashmead, 1890)^{i c g}
- Protandrena compositarum (Robertson, 1893)^{i c g b}
- Protandrena concinna (Fox, 1894)^{i c g}
- Protandrena didirupa (Cockerell, 1908)^{i c g}
- Protandrena expallida (Swenk & Cockerell, 1907)^{i c g}
- Protandrena friesei Timberlake, 1973^{i c g}
- Protandrena helianthi Mitchell, 1960^{i c g}
- Protandrena horizontalis (Swenk & Cockerell, 1907)^{i c g}
- Protandrena illustris Timberlake, 1967^{i c g}
- Protandrena innupta (Cockerell, 1896)^{i c g}
- Protandrena irregularis (Cockerell, 1922)^{i c g}
- Protandrena labrosa (Robertson, 1895)^{i c g}
- Protandrena labrosiformis (Robertson, 1898)^{i c g}
- Protandrena leucoptera (Cockerell, 1923)^{i c g}
- Protandrena nitescens (Cockerell, 1918)^{i c g}
- Protandrena nubis (Cockerell, 1913)^{i c g}
- Protandrena occidua Timberlake, 1967^{i c g}
- Protandrena ornatipes (Cresson, 1872)^{i c g}
- Protandrena pecki (Cockerell, 1937)^{i c g}
- Protandrena perlaevis (Cockerell, 1896)^{i c g}
- Protandrena piercei (Crawford, 1903)^{i c g}
- Protandrena planata (Cockerell, 1918)^{i c g}
- Protandrena porterae (Cockerell, 1900)^{i c}
- Protandrena renimaculata (Cockerell, 1896)^{i c g}
- Protandrena rudbeckiae (Robertson, 1895)^{i c}
- Protandrena simulans (Swenk & Cockerell, 1907)^{i c g}
- Protandrena solidaginis (Robertson, 1893)^{i c g}
- Protandrena stathamae Timberlake, 1967^{i c g}
- Protandrena stigmalis (Swenk & Cockerell, 1907)^{i c g}
- Protandrena vicina Timberlake, 1967^{i c g}
- Protandrena ximenesiae (Cockerell, 1913)^{i c g}
- Protandrena zamoranica (Cockerell, 1949)^{i c g}
