= Pseudopanurgus parvus =

Scientific classification
- Kingdom: Animalia
- Phylum: Arthropoda
- Class: Insecta
- Order: Hymenoptera
- Family: Andrenidae
- Tribe: Protandrenini
- Genus: Pseudopanurgus
- Species: P. parvus

Binomial name
- Pseudopanurgus parvus (Robertson, 1892)

Species of bee

Pseudopanurgus parvus is a species of miner bee in the family Andrenidae. It is found in North America.
