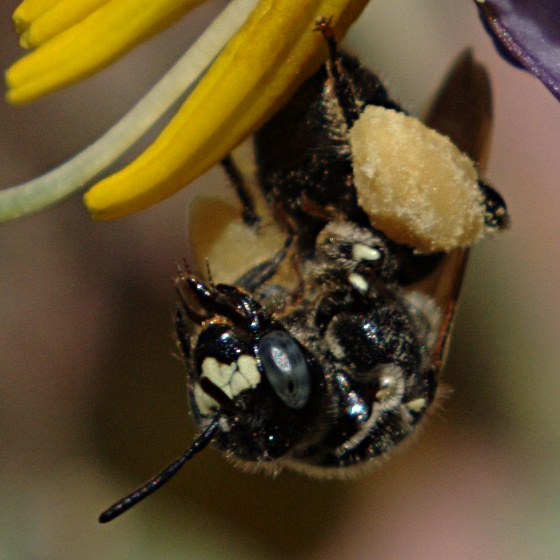

Scientific classification
- Kingdom: Animalia
- Phylum: Arthropoda
- Class: Insecta
- Order: Hymenoptera
- Family: Andrenidae
- Tribe: Protandrenini
- Genus: Protandrena
- Species: P. mexicanorum

Binomial name
- Protandrena mexicanorum (Cockerell, 1896)

= Protandrena mexicanorum =

Species of bee

Protandrena mexicanorum is a species of bee in the family Andrenidae. It is found in Central America and North America.
