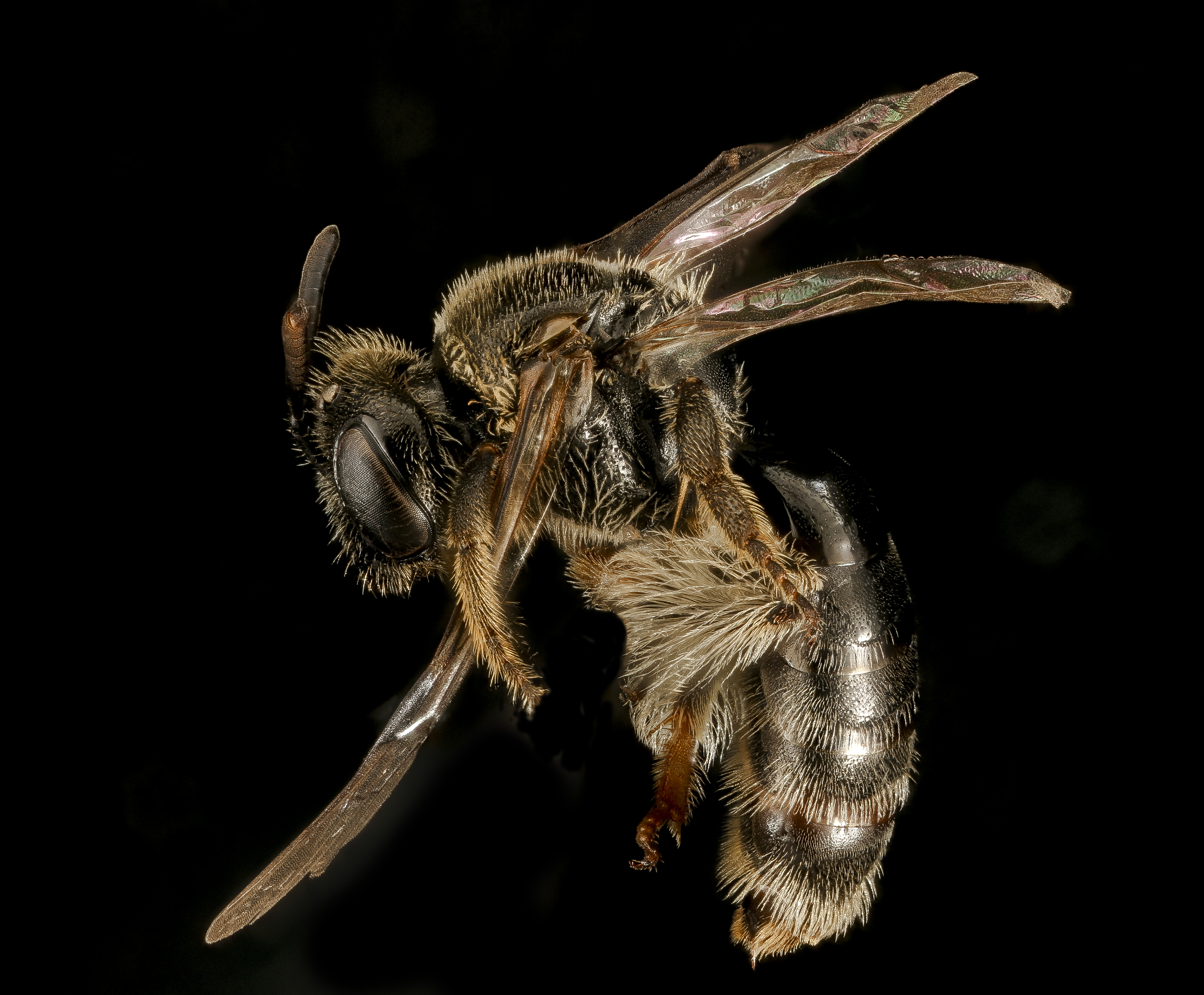
- Female

Scientific classification
- Domain: Eukaryota
- Kingdom: Animalia
- Phylum: Arthropoda
- Class: Insecta
- Order: Hymenoptera
- Family: Andrenidae
- Tribe: Protandrenini
- Genus: Pseudopanurgus
- Species: P. albitarsis

Binomial name
- Pseudopanurgus albitarsis Zetterstedt, 1838

= Pseudopanurgus albitarsis =

Species of bee

Pseudopanurgus albitarsis is a species of bee in the family Andrenidae. It is found in Central America and North America.
