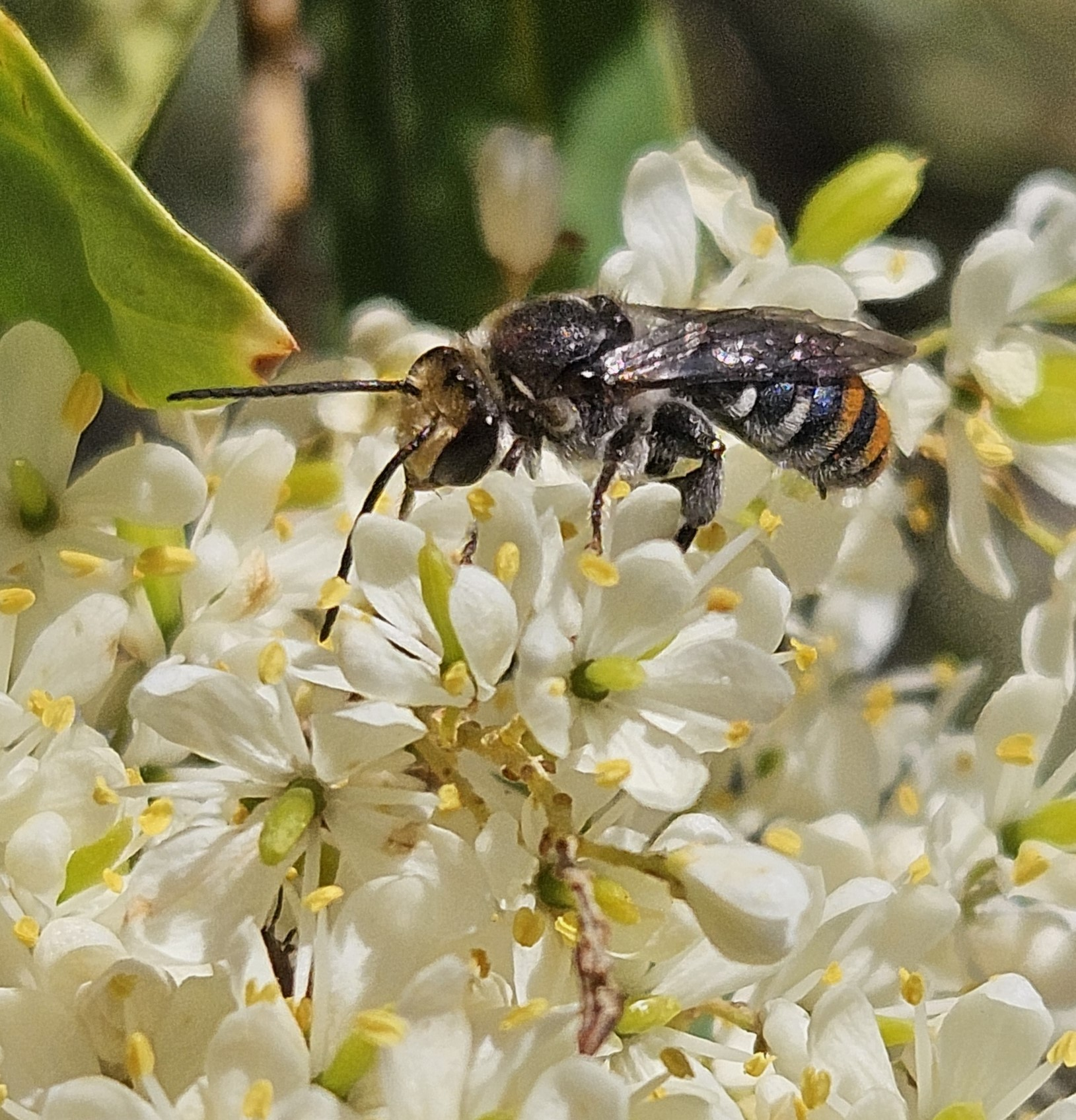

Scientific classification
- Kingdom: Animalia
- Phylum: Arthropoda
- Class: Insecta
- Order: Hymenoptera
- Family: Halictidae
- Genus: Lipotriches
- Species: L. australica

Binomial name
- Lipotriches australica (Smith, 1875)

= Lipotriches australica =

Species of bee

Lipotriches australica, commonly known as the green and gold nomia, is a species of bee in the family Halictidae. It was described by Frederick Smith in 1875, and is widely distributed across mainland Australia. It is approximately the size of a European honeybee, and it is a buzz pollinator. When conditions are optimal, the females can nest in dense aggregations with tens of thousands of nests per hectare. Males are often seen clustered together in roosting aggregations. This was one of four species featured in a set of native bee postage stamps, which were available from Australia Post in 2019.

== Taxonomy ==
This species was described in 1875 by Frederick Smith, who named it Nomia australica. In the 21st century it was moved to the genus Lipotriches by Professor Charles Michener, and it lies within the subgenus Austronomia. It is commonly known as the green and gold nomia in reference to the metallic blue-green shine on the abdomen and bands of golden hair.

== Description ==
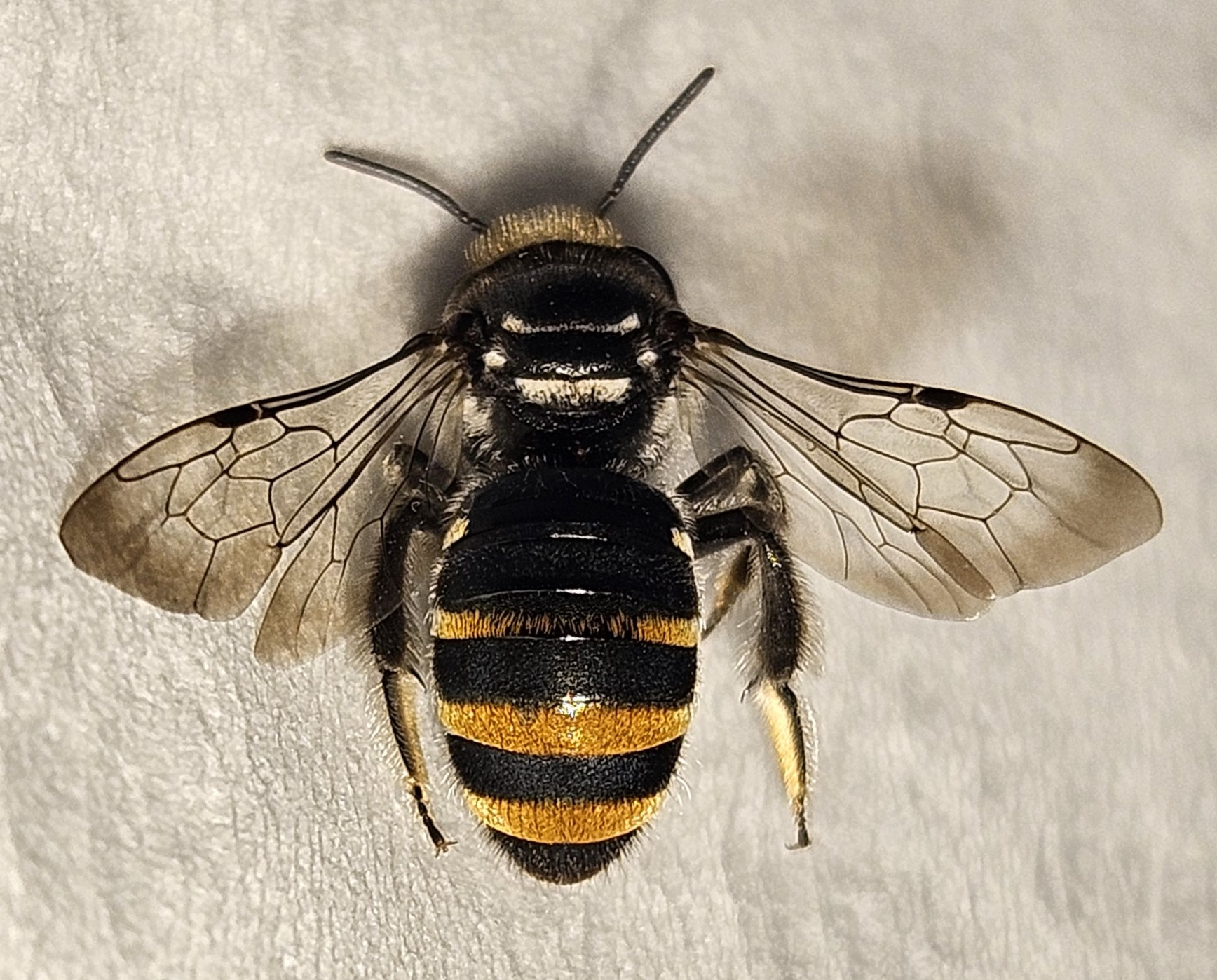
Female Male with modified hind leg visible.

Lipotriches australica is approximately 10mm long, which is around the size of a European honeybee. The head and thorax are black, and there is a patch of short, white hair at the rear of the thorax. The abdomen has broad bands of golden hair, and a metallic blue-green sheen on the first few segments. The colour of the hair in this species can vary with age and location. The wings are semi-transparent, and faintly clouded towards the tips. Males have a narrower abdomen than females. Males also have modified hind legs, with the tibia expanded and angular, and the femur being swollen. This is believed to assist with grasping females during copulation.

== Distribution and habitat ==
L. australica is abundant and widely distributed across mainland Australia, with records from all Australian states and territories except Tasmania.

== Behaviour and ecology ==
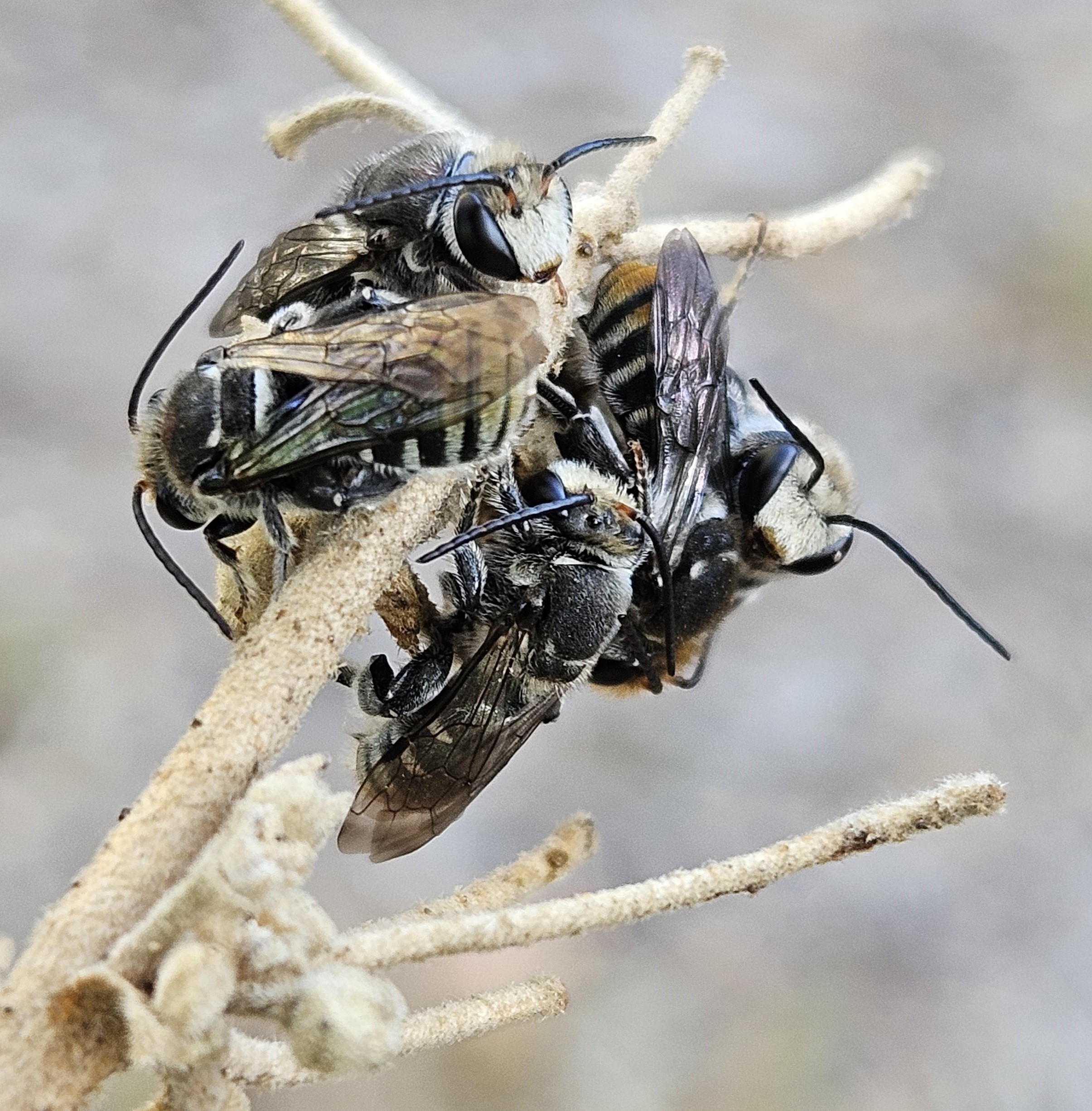
Males in a roosting aggregation

L. australica is a buzz pollinator, and will visit many different flowering species. Males are often seen clustered together in roosting aggregations.

Nests are dug in soil, and consist of a vertical burrow leading to one or more cavities containing clusters of brood cells. Up to three females may share a nest, but each female builds and provisions her own brood cells. Each cell is lined with a waterproof secretion, and contains a single egg along with a nectar and pollen provision. Females have been observed taking turns guarding the nest entrance, retreating to a small chamber just below the entrance when a nestmate wants to enter. The guard blocks the entrance with her head during the day, but with her abdomen at night.

When the adults are active, the entrance to the burrow can be surrounded by a low mound of soil, but during the cooler months of inactivity, the burrow is closed with a soil-plug. When conditions are optimal, the females can nest in dense aggregations with tens of thousands of nests per hectare. A nest site may be used for a few years, with successive generations cleaning debris out of the brood cells to reuse them.

In Victoria, this species is active from September to April, with a peak in February.

== In culture ==
This was one of four species featured in a set of native bee postage stamps, which were available from Australia Post in 2019.
