= Buzz pollination =

Technique used by bees to release pollen

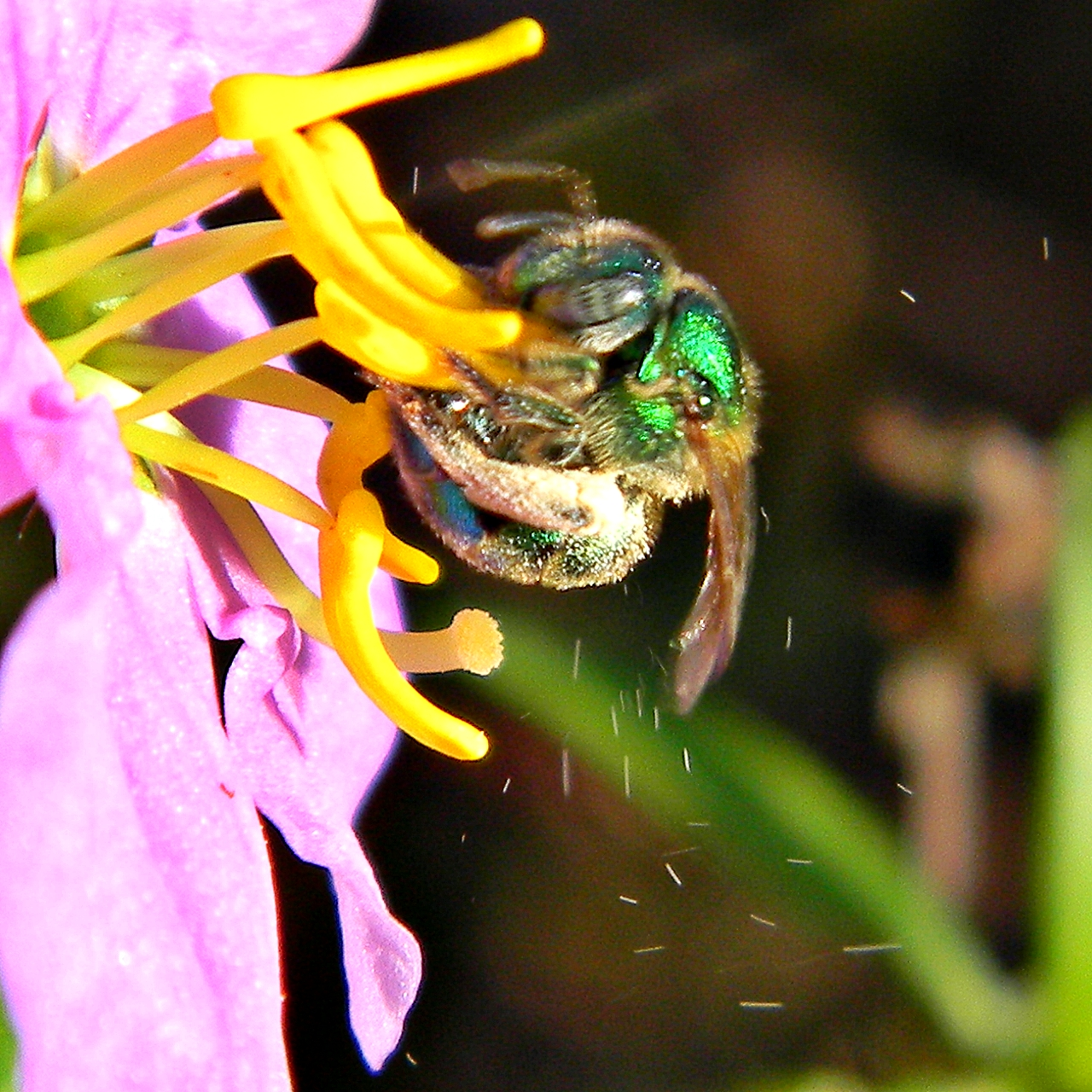
A female Augochloropsis using buzz pollination

Bumble bee buzz-pollinates Solanum dulcamara

Buzz pollination or sonication is a technique used by some bees, such as solitary bees and bumblebees, to release pollen which is more or less firmly held by the anthers. The anthers of buzz-pollinated plant species are typically tubular, with an opening at only one end, and the pollen inside is smooth-grained and firmly attached. With self-fertile plants such as tomatoes, wind may be sufficient to shake loose the pollen through pores in the anther and accomplish pollination. Visits by bees may also shake loose some pollen, but more efficient pollination of those plants is accomplished by a few insect species who specialize in sonication or buzz pollination.

In order to release the pollen, solitary bees are able to grab onto the flower and move their flight muscles rapidly, causing the flower and anthers to vibrate, dislodging pollen. Pollination involving vibrations is called buzz pollination. Honeybees cannot perform buzz pollination. About 9% of the flowers of the world are primarily pollinated using buzz pollination.

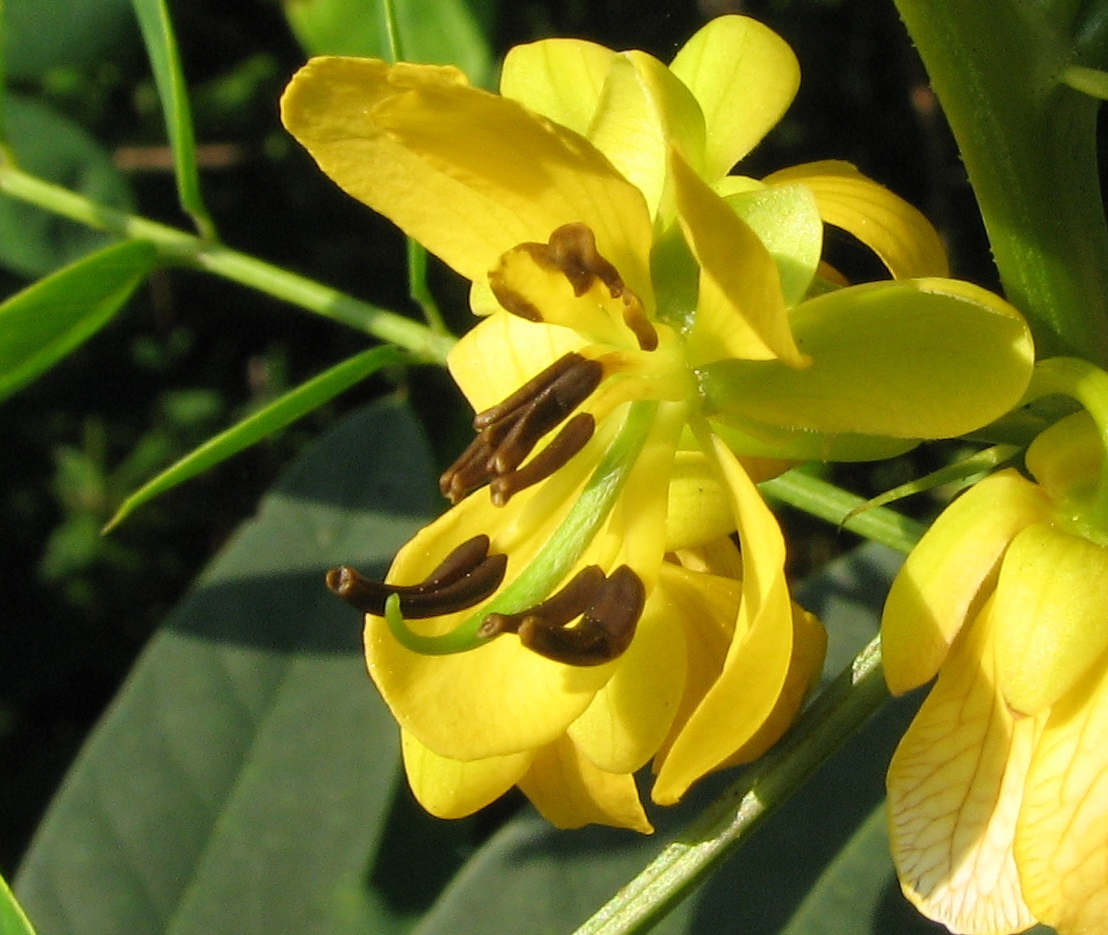
Senna's poricidal anthers.

== Flower morphology ==
Plants that rely on buzz pollination have a unique anther shape compared to other flora. In buzz pollinated plants, this process can only happen if pollinators visit the flowers to extract pollen. Only a few insect species are able to pollinate these plants. The flower morphology of buzz pollinated plants is different from that of other flora that do not use this type of pollination. The anthers are completely sealed except for a small pore at the top or have very small slits that open along the sides. The pores and slits are small enough that insects cannot easily enter the anther, but large enough pollen can exit. Because of this shape, they are often referred to as poricidal anthers. These poricidal anthers are only able to release pollen when vibrated at a specific frequency. The stigmas of these flowers are often located below the anthers. This is could be an evolutionary strategy to prevent self-fertilization, also known as selfing, by creating distance between the stigma.

== Plants pollinated by buzz pollination ==
The following plants are pollinated more efficiently by buzz pollination:

- All species in Primula sect. Dodecatheon (shooting stars)
- Heliamphora
- Many members of the family Solanaceae
  - Most species of the genus Solanum
    - Eggplants
    - Potatoes
    - Tomatoes
    - Buffalo bur
    - Solanum cinereum, an Australian shrub
- Hibbertia
- Dianella (flax lilies)
- Many members of Ericaceae
  - Some members of the genus Rhododendron
  - Some members of the genus Vaccinium
    - Blueberries
    - Cranberries
  - Arctostaphylos – manzanita
- Some Fabaceae
  - Senna

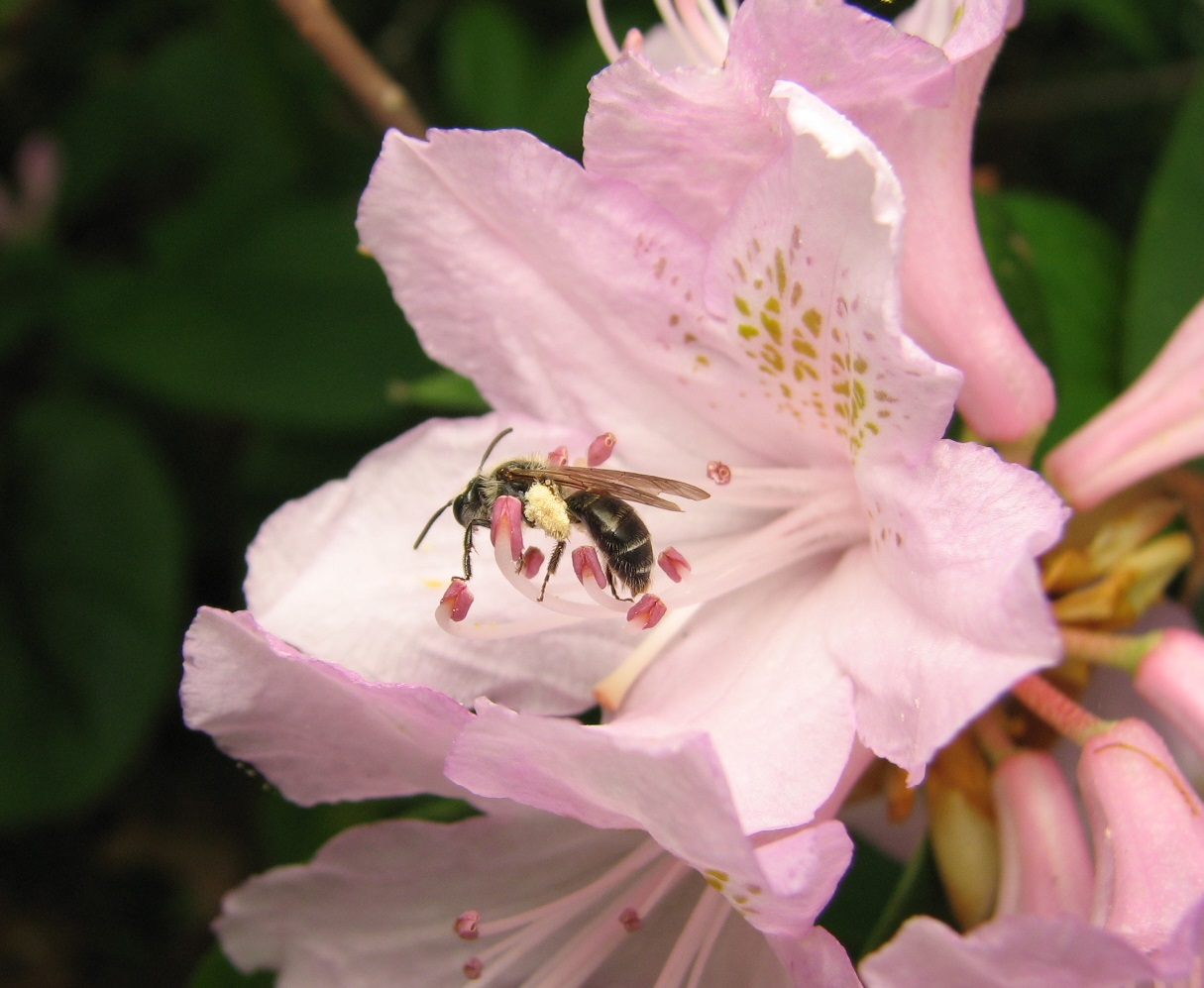
Andrena cornelli performing buzz pollination of Azalea.

== Examples of buzz pollinating bee species ==
- Amegilla sp.
- Bombus terrestris
- Euglossa sp.
- Melipona sp.
- Nomia sp.
- Oxaea sp.
- Protandrena sp.
- Xylocopa frontalis

== Evolutionary origins ==
The earliest evidence of ancestors of plants that use this mode of pollination in the fossil record has been dated to the Cretaceous period. Also, some extant flora such as members of the family Myrtaceae show a spectrum of anther shapes including poricidal anthers and are thought to resemble some morphological aspects of ancestral buzz pollinated flowers. As these plants have evolved complex floral structures, pollinators have coevolved with these plants.

Although pollination results from the bees visiting these flowers, this is not the primary reason they visit plants with poricidal anthers. Pollen contains a substantial amount of protein compared to nectar, the sugary liquid the majority of plants produce as a reward for their animal pollinators. Bees eat pollen as well as make a paste with it to feed their larvae. The pollen paste is then sealed into the nest to create a reserve for the young bees. Bees rely on this resource for food; therefore they are also dependent on flowers that produce substantial amounts of accessible pollen, including flowers with poricidal anthers. Bees from Bombus and Xylocopa are thought to pollinate these flowers because their adaptive behavior allows them to easily extract pollen that is less available to other insects. Since bees have a source of plentiful pollen that they do not have to compete with other insects for, they are more likely to visit these flowers. This then allows the flowers to be more successful reproductively because the plants maximize their pollen dispersal with each bee visit, and less pollen is lost. The relationship between buzz pollinated plants and bees benefits both groups and could be why poricidal anthers have been successful evolutionarily. Pollinator and flower relationships have been observed in Orphium frutescens, a small shrub that has poricidal anthers. Bees visited these plants outside of the University of Cape Town and continued to visit the plants even when all of the pollen had been extracted. Although the bees did not know the O. frutescens would benefit from these multiple visits as the plants continue to produce pollen during the flowering season.

== Economic impacts ==
Scientists can now import pollinators, such as bumblebees, where there might be a shortage of pollinators. In New Zealand, the red clover plant population was restored when bumblebees were imported from Europe to help with the pollination. Maintaining red clover population in New Zealand at the time was critical to the country's crop production rate. However, in North America, the managed honeybee industry experienced decline in the early 2000s due to colony collapse disorder. This has led to higher expenses for farmers from the east to the west coast of the United States and Canada to help pollinate almonds, cucumbers and certain seed plants.

One of the most common plants that are assisted by buzz pollination is the tomato (Solanum lycopersicum). In greenhouses worldwide, up to 50 bumblebee colonies are used per hectare during growing season, bringing in values of approximately €13 million a year for a 40,000 hectare globally. Due to competition between producers and an increase in success rate of rearing, the total costs for the bumblebee colonies have diminished severely. This common practice has led to producers branching out and selling not only bumblebees but other insects who may have mutualistic relationships with plants. The total profit of this industry has been recorded to produce over €111 million a year, with €61 million coming in from bumblebees alone.

== Environmental impacts ==
Some conservation organisations expressed concerns about the potential environmental impacts of introducing bumblebees around the world to aid in pollination. In Australia, as bumblebees are not native, and Australia has a number of widely publicised environmental disasters caused by escaped introduced species ("feral species"), research is under way to adapt the use of the Australian native Amegilla cingulata (blue banded bees) for the same task.

== Alternative means of pollination ==
Greenhouse grown tomatoes are unproductive without aid in pollination. Traditionally, pollination has been done by shaking using electric vibrators (one brand name was "Electric Bee"), however, it has been found to be less expensive in human labor and plant breakage to use bumblebees within the greenhouses. Home growers and amateurs can be seen on YouTube using electric toothbrushes to pollinate their flowers.
