= Pseudopanurgus fraterculus =

Scientific classification
- Kingdom: Animalia
- Phylum: Arthropoda
- Class: Insecta
- Order: Hymenoptera
- Family: Andrenidae
- Tribe: Protandrenini
- Genus: Pseudopanurgus
- Species: P. fraterculus

Binomial name
- Pseudopanurgus fraterculus (Cockerell, 1896)

Species of bee

Pseudopanurgus fraterculus is a species of bee in the family Andrenidae. It is found in Central America and North America.

== Subspecies ==
These two subspecies belong to the species Pseudopanurgus fraterculus:

- Pseudopanurgus fraterculus fraterculus (Cockerell, 1896)
- Pseudopanurgus fraterculus timberlakei Cockerell, 1931
