= Pseudopanurgus compositarum =

Scientific classification
- Domain: Eukaryota
- Kingdom: Animalia
- Phylum: Arthropoda
- Class: Insecta
- Order: Hymenoptera
- Family: Andrenidae
- Tribe: Protandrenini
- Genus: Pseudopanurgus
- Species: P. compositarum

Binomial name
- Pseudopanurgus compositarum (Robertson, 1893)

Species of insect

Pseudopanurgus compositarum is a species of bee in the family Andrenidae. It is found in North America.
