= Protandrena cockerelli =

Scientific classification
- Domain: Eukaryota
- Kingdom: Animalia
- Phylum: Arthropoda
- Class: Insecta
- Order: Hymenoptera
- Family: Andrenidae
- Tribe: Protandrenini
- Genus: Protandrena
- Species: P. cockerelli

Binomial name
- Protandrena cockerelli Dunning, 1897

Species of bee

Protandrena cockerelli is a species of bee in the family Andrenidae. It is found in North America.
