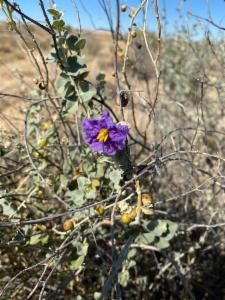
- Shrubs full extent

Scientific classification
- Kingdom: Plantae
- Clade: Tracheophytes
- Clade: Angiosperms
- Clade: Eudicots
- Clade: Asterids
- Order: Solanales
- Family: Solanaceae
- Genus: Solanum
- Species: S. oligacanthum

Binomial name
- Solanum oligacanthum F. Muell.
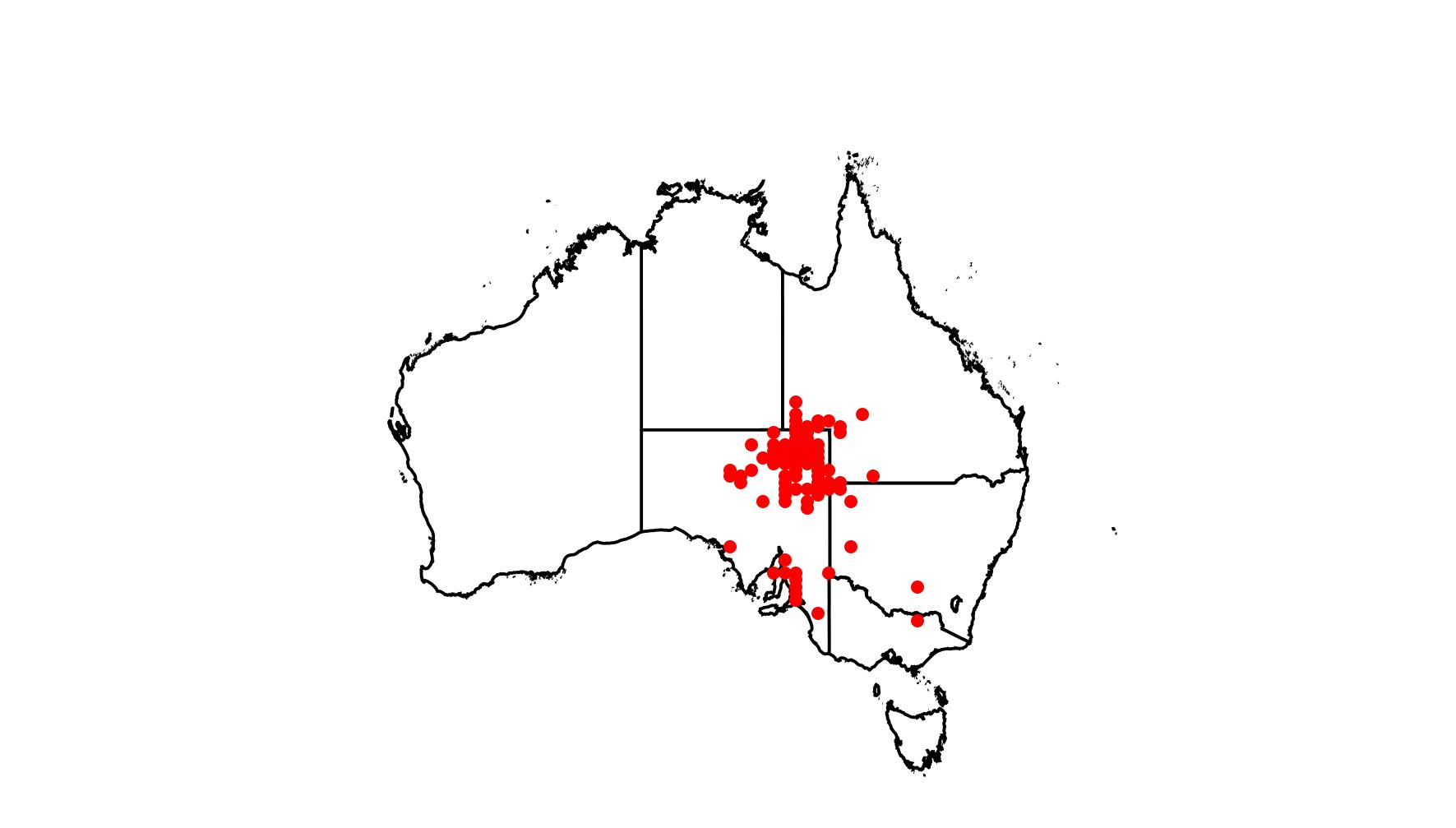
- Distribution within Australia

= Solanum oligacanthum =

Species of plant

Solanum oligacanthum is a species of herbaceous perennial herb or subshrub which is spread throughout central east Australia (South-West Queensland, North-West New South Wales, and North-East South Australia). This species is often found in seasonally flooded creek channels, flats and lagoons, and commonly referred to as desert nightshade.

== Description ==
Solanum oligacanthum is an erect, colonial, herbaceous perennial species. It grows up to 1 m (3 ft 3 in) in height. This species is of pale grey-green colour, resulting from densely pubescent stellate hairs up to 16 mm (0.63 in) long.

Its leaves are broadly ovate, 7–20 mm (0.28–0.79 in) wide and long, with the apex obtuse and rounded, and the base obtuse to cordate.

The corollas is purple and rotate (20–25 mm (0.79–0.98 in) diameter), containing the yellow anthers arranged in the centre forming a cone-like structure.

Its seeds are 4–5 mm (0.16–0.20 in) long, black or dark-brownish in colour.

== Ecology ==
Solanum oligacanthum grows in arid shrub lands within Australia. New growth occurs in spring, and most top growth dies down over winter leaving dead stubble.

This species, like most Solanum, pollinates through a process known as buzz pollination.

It is classified as a weed within some parts of South Australia.

== Distribution and conservation status ==
Desert nightshade is distributed predominately within central eastern Australia, spread between South-West Queensland, North-West New South Wales, and North-East South Australia, with some being found on the Eastern Coast of South Australia as well. There is no conservation status listed for Solanum oligacanthum so it is assumed this species conservation is of low-concern.

== Gallery ==
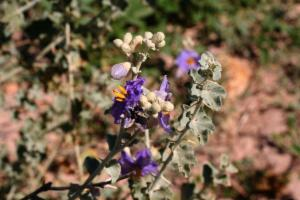
Close up of multiple flowers

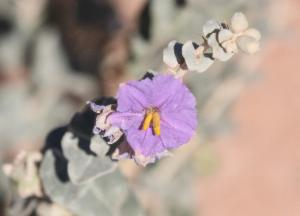
Close up of a single flower, and visible cone-like anther
