= Lipotriches pulchriventris =

Scientific classification
- Domain: Eukaryota
- Kingdom: Animalia
- Phylum: Arthropoda
- Class: Insecta
- Order: Hymenoptera
- Family: Halictidae
- Genus: Lipotriches
- Subgenus: Rhopalomelissa
- Species: L. pulchriventris

Binomial name
- Lipotriches pulchriventris (Cameron, 1897)

Synonyms
- Nomia clavata Smith, 1862; Halictus pulchriventris Cameron, 1897; Nomia dimidiata Vachal, 1897; Nomia pulchriventris (Cameron, 1897); Nomia aureobalteata Cameron, 1902; Nomia halictella var. triangularis Cockerell, 1905; Nomia pseudoceratina Cockerell, 1910; Nomia halictura Cockerell, 1911; Nomia levicauda Cockerell, 1919; Rhopalomelissa xanthogaster Alfken, 1926; Nomia wallacei Cockerell, 1939; Rhopalomelissa (Trichorhopalomelissa) hainanensis Wu, 1985; Rhopalomelissa (Trichorhopalomelissa) zeae Wu, 1985; Lipotriches (Lipotriches) aureobalteata (Cameron, 1902); Lipotriches (Lipotriches) triangularis (Cockerell, 1905); Lipotriches (Lipotriches) xanthogastra (Alfken, 1926); Lipotriches (Lipotriches) hainanensis (Wu, 1985); Lipotriches (Lipotriches) zeae (Wu, 1985)

Species of bee

Lipotriches pulchriventris is a species of bee in the genus Lipotriches, of the family Halictidae. It is widespread in Southeast Asia and variable in appearance, and has been given numerous names since its original description.
