= Lipotriches exagens =

Scientific classification
- Kingdom: Animalia
- Phylum: Arthropoda
- Class: Insecta
- Order: Hymenoptera
- Family: Halictidae
- Genus: Lipotriches
- Species: L. exagens

Binomial name
- Lipotriches exagens (Walker, 1860)

Synonyms
- Andrena exagens Walker, 1860; Nomia exagens (Walker, 1860); Halictus timidus Smith, 1879; Nomia timida (Smith, 1879); Nomia puttalama Strand, 1913

Species of bee

Lipotriches exagens is a species of bee in the genus Lipotriches, of the family Halictidae.
