= Lipotriches bombayensis =

Scientific classification
- Domain: Eukaryota
- Kingdom: Animalia
- Phylum: Arthropoda
- Class: Insecta
- Order: Hymenoptera
- Family: Halictidae
- Genus: Lipotriches
- Subgenus: Rhopalomelissa
- Species: L. bombayensis

Binomial name
- Lipotriches bombayensis (Cameron, 1908)

Synonyms
- Andrena bombayensis; Nomia bombayensis

Species of bee

Lipotriches bombayensis is a species of bee in the genus Lipotriches, of the family Halictidae.
