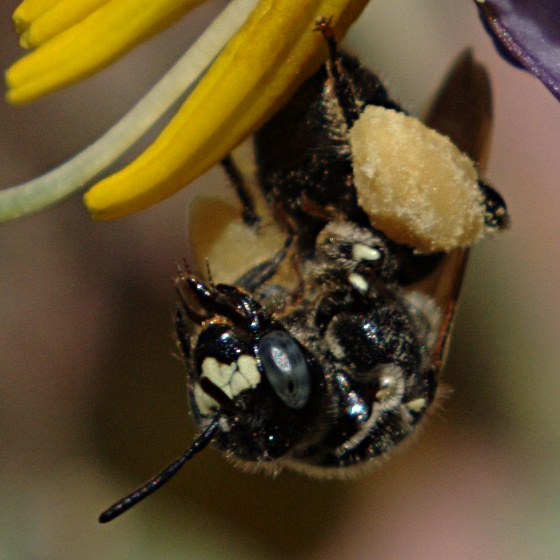
- female Protandrena mexicanorum on Solanum

Scientific classification
- Kingdom: Animalia
- Phylum: Arthropoda
- Class: Insecta
- Order: Hymenoptera
- Family: Andrenidae
- Subfamily: Panurginae
- Tribe: Protandrenini
- Genus: Protandrena; Cockerell, 1896

Subgenera (disputed; see text)
- Andinopanurgus; Austropanurgus; Heterosarus; Metapsaenythia; Parasarus; Protandrena; Pterosarus

= Protandrena =

Genus of bees

Protandrena is a genus of mining bees in the family Andrenidae. Depending upon whose definition of the genus one follows, there are anywhere from 50 to 180 described species in Protandrena; traditional classifications recognize 7 subgenera, some of which are sometimes elevated to genus rank, and other classifications place many of these species in the related genus Pseudopanurgus (e.g.), leaving Protandrena with a much smaller constituency. In the most inclusive definition, they are found from Canada through Argentina. However, there is current disagreement whether the Protandrena in South America belong to different genera, in which case the genus extends only as far south as Panama.

== Ecology ==
They are solitary bees, but some species nest in aggregations. They prefer to nest in sunny areas with sparse vegetation. The underground nests have cells lined with a chemical substance. This "wallpaper" acts as a barrier between fungi and bacteria. The eggs hatch, the larvae develop, and then overwinter as mature larvae with hardened skin. They are primarily active from May to October, but have been noted to be active in April in the region six of the United States. Cuckoo bees in the genus Holcopasites have been found as kleptoparasites in Protandrena nests.

There are specialists and generalists found in the genus Protandrena. One notable specialist is Protandrena abdominalis, a specialist on Monarda punctata (bee balm) that is placed in its own subgenus, Metapsaenythia.

== Morphology ==
Protandrena are typically slender black bees. They frequently have yellow on the face and pronotum. They may have red on the metasoma. They rarely have a green or blue tint. The forewings will have two or three submarginal cells. The photo to the right shows submarginal cells (on Lasioglossum). The three submarginal cells are near the top of the wing.

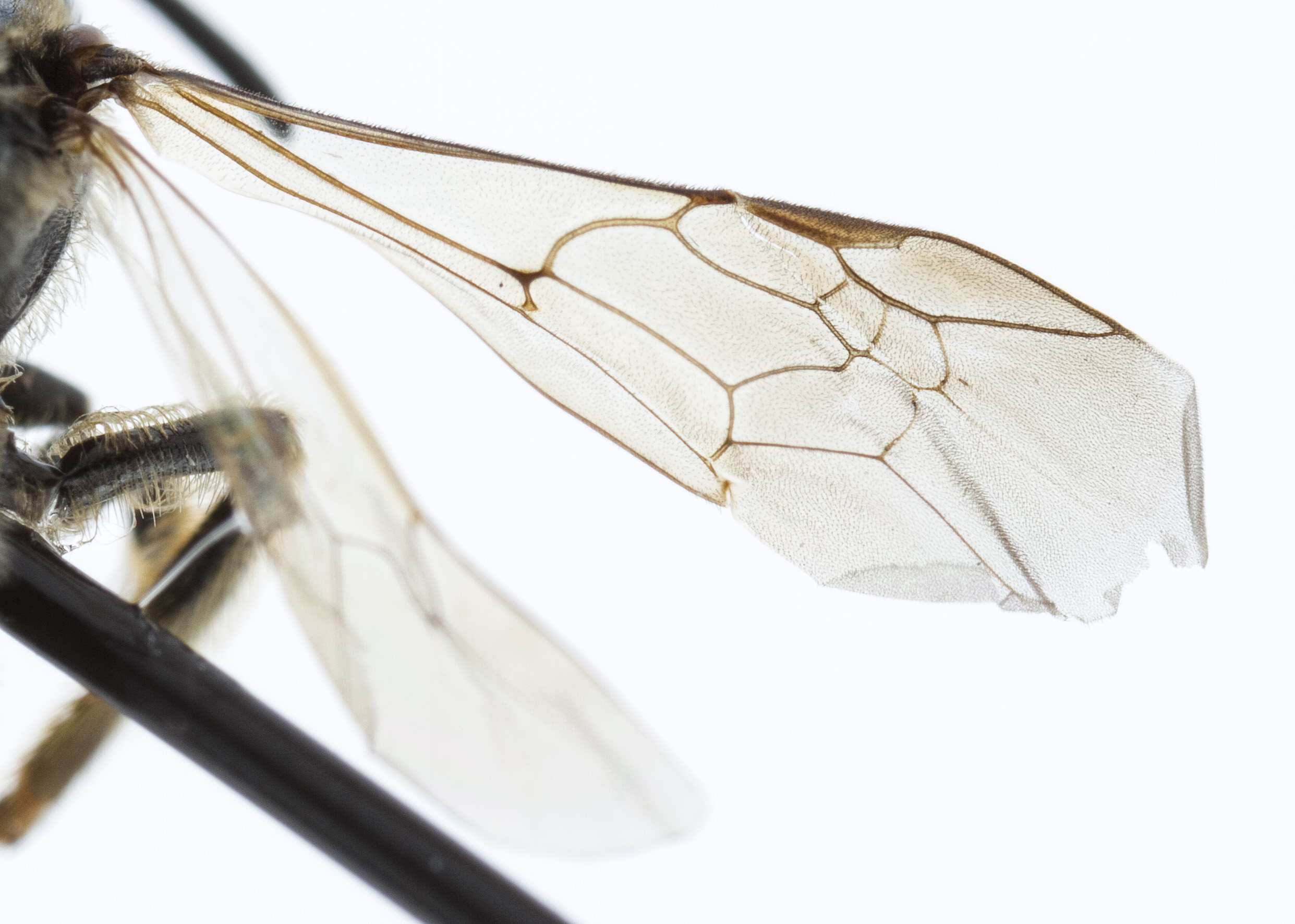
The wing of Lasioglossum (subgenus Dialictus) illustrating submarginal cells

Other Identifying characteristics include

- middle tibial spur on the female that is finely toothed basally and becomes coarser distally; an exception to this is the South American subgenus Austropanurgus, where the spur is finely toothed throughout.
- The male's last abdominal sternum has a pair of large distal lobes that are constricted at the base.
- The gonostyli are more than half as long as the gonocoxites, with the apices articulated or partly fused. The South American subgenus Parasarus is an exception to this, with the gonostyli being less than 1/3 as long as the gonocoxites.

== Etymology ==
Protandrena means "basic Andrena". This is referring to the facial similarities to Andrena

== Selected species ==
- Protandrena abdominalis (Cresson, 1878)^{i c g}
- Protandrena amplipennis Timberlake, 1976^{i c g}
- Protandrena angusticeps Timberlake, 1976^{i c g}
- Protandrena avulsa Ramos & Melo, 2006^{i c g}
- Protandrena bachue Gonzalez & Ruz, 2007^{i c g}
- Protandrena bancrofti Dunning, 1897^{i c g}
- Protandrena bicolor (Timberlake, 1955)^{i c g}
- Protandrena bishoppi Crawford, 1916^{i c g}
- Protandrena blandula Timberlake, 1976^{i c g}
- Protandrena boharti Timberlake, 1976^{i c g}
- Protandrena cockerelli Dunning, 1897^{i c g b}
- Protandrena cognata Timberlake, 1976^{i c g}
- Protandrena duplonotata (Timberlake, 1955)^{i c}
- Protandrena durangoensis Timberlake, 1976^{i c g}
- Protandrena eclepta Timberlake, 1976^{i c g}
- Protandrena euphorbiae (Timberlake, 1955)^{i c}
- Protandrena exigua Timberlake, 1976^{i c g}
- Protandrena fasciata Timberlake, 1976^{i c g}
- Protandrena foveata Timberlake, 1976^{i c g}
- Protandrena guarnensis Gonzalez & Ruz, 2007^{i c g}
- Protandrena heteromorpha (Cockerell, 1896)^{i c g}
- Protandrena hurdi Timberlake, 1976^{i c g}
- Protandrena impressa Timberlake, 1976^{i c g}
- Protandrena irwini Timberlake, 1976^{i c g}
- Protandrena kansensis Timberlake, 1976^{i c g}
- Protandrena lateralis Timberlake, 1976^{i c g}
- Protandrena leucopus Timberlake, 1976^{i c g}
- Protandrena lipovskyi Timberlake, 1976^{i c g}
- Protandrena maculata Timberlake, 1976^{i c g}
- Protandrena marstoni Timberlake, 1976^{i c g}
- Protandrena maurula (Cockerell, 1896)^{i c g}
- Protandrena maximina Gonzalez & Ruz, 2007^{i c g}
- Protandrena metanotalis Timberlake, 1976^{i c g}
- Protandrena mexicanorum (Cockerell, 1896)^{i c g b}
- Protandrena modesta (Smith, 1879)^{i c g}
- Protandrena nudescens Timberlake, 1976^{i c g}
- Protandrena pectidis (Timberlake, 1955)^{i c g}
- Protandrena pernitens Timberlake, 1976^{i c g}
- Protandrena persimilis Timberlake, 1976^{i c g}
- Protandrena polita Timberlake, 1976^{i c g}
- Protandrena protuberata Timberlake, 1976^{i c g}
- Protandrena punctulata Timberlake, 1976^{i c g}
- Protandrena rangeli Gonzalez & Ruz, 2007^{i c g}
- Protandrena scutellata Cockerell, 1916^{i c g}
- Protandrena semilevis Timberlake, 1976^{i c g}
- Protandrena skinneri Timberlake, 1976^{i c g}
- Protandrena sorocula Timberlake, 1976^{i c g}
- Protandrena sphaeralceae Timberlake, 1976^{i c g}
- Protandrena swenki Crawford, 1913^{i c g}
- Protandrena tessellata Timberlake, 1976^{i c g}
- Protandrena texana Timberlake, 1976^{i c g}
- Protandrena tidestromiae Timberlake, 1976^{i c g}
- Protandrena trifoliata (Cockerell, 1896)^{i c g}
- Protandrena trilobata Timberlake, 1976^{i c g}
- Protandrena unimaculata Timberlake, 1976^{i c g}
- Protandrena verbesinae (Timberlake, 1955)^{i c g}
- Protandrena wayruronga Gonzalez & Ruz, 2007^{i c g}
- Protandrena xestops Timberlake, 1976^{i c g}

Data sources: i = ITIS, c = Catalogue of Life, g = GBIF, b = Bugguide.net
