= Lipotriches fulvinerva =

Scientific classification
- Domain: Eukaryota
- Kingdom: Animalia
- Phylum: Arthropoda
- Class: Insecta
- Order: Hymenoptera
- Family: Halictidae
- Genus: Lipotriches
- Subgenus: Lipotriches
- Species: L. fulvinerva

Binomial name
- Lipotriches fulvinerva (Cameron, 1907)

Synonyms
- Nomia silhetica Smith, 1853; Nomia aurifrons Smith, 1875; Nomia fulvinerva Cameron, 1907; Nomia andrenina Cockerell, 1911; Nomia ceylonica Friese, 1913; Lipotriches (Lipotriches) andrenina (Cockerell, 1911); Lipotriches (Lipotriches) ceylonica (Friese, 1913)

Species of bee

Lipotriches fulvinerva is a species of bee in the genus Lipotriches, of the family Halictidae.
