= Lipotriches rustica =

Scientific classification
- Kingdom: Animalia
- Phylum: Arthropoda
- Clade: Pancrustacea
- Class: Insecta
- Order: Hymenoptera
- Family: Halictidae
- Genus: Lipotriches
- Subgenus: Macronomia
- Species: L. rustica

Binomial name
- Lipotriches rustica (Westwood, 1875)

Synonyms
- Nomia rustica; Macronomia rustica

Species of bee

Lipotriches rustica is a species of bee in the genus Lipotriches, of the family Halictidae.
