= Lipotriches torrida =

Scientific classification
- Kingdom: Animalia
- Phylum: Arthropoda
- Class: Insecta
- Order: Hymenoptera
- Family: Halictidae
- Genus: Lipotriches
- Species: L. torrida

Binomial name
- Lipotriches torrida (Smith, 1879)

Synonyms
- Andrena torrida Smith, 1879; Nomia comperta Cockerell, 1912; Lipotriches (Lipotriches) comperta (Cockerell, 1912)

Species of bee

Lipotriches torrida is a species of bee in the genus Lipotriches, of the family Halictidae.
