= Pseudopanurgus atricornis =

Scientific classification
- Domain: Eukaryota
- Kingdom: Animalia
- Phylum: Arthropoda
- Class: Insecta
- Order: Hymenoptera
- Family: Andrenidae
- Genus: Pseudopanurgus
- Species: P. atricornis

Binomial name
- Pseudopanurgus atricornis Grote, 1874

Species of bee

Pseudopanurgus atricornis is a species of bee in the family Andrenidae. It is found in Central America and North America.
