= Lipotriches notiomorpha =

Scientific classification
- Kingdom: Animalia
- Phylum: Arthropoda
- Class: Insecta
- Order: Hymenoptera
- Family: Halictidae
- Genus: Lipotriches
- Subgenus: Austronomia
- Species: L. notiomorpha

Binomial name
- Lipotriches notiomorpha (Hirashima, 1978)

Synonyms
- Nomia notiomorpha; Austronomia notiomorpha

Species of bee

Lipotriches notiomorpha is a species of bee in the genus Lipotriches, of the family Halictidae. It is endemic to Sri Lanka, where it was first found from Anuradhapura district.
