= Lipotriches krombeini =

Scientific classification
- Domain: Eukaryota
- Kingdom: Animalia
- Phylum: Arthropoda
- Class: Insecta
- Order: Hymenoptera
- Family: Halictidae
- Genus: Lipotriches
- Species: L. krombeini

Binomial name
- Lipotriches krombeini Hirashima, 1978

Species of bee

Lipotriches krombeini is a species of bee in the genus Lipotriches, of the family Halictidae.
