= Protandrena bachue =

Scientific classification
- Kingdom: Animalia
- Phylum: Arthropoda
- Clade: Pancrustacea
- Class: Insecta
- Order: Hymenoptera
- Family: Andrenidae
- Genus: Protandrena
- Subgenus: Andinopanurgus
- Species: P. bachue

Binomial name
- Protandrena bachue González & Ruz, 2007

Species of bee

Protandrena bachue is the type species of mining bee in the subgenus Andinopanurgus of genus Protandrena, first described by Victor H. González and Luisa Ruz in 2007.

== Etymology and habitat ==
The genus name is named after the Andes, referring to the Andean distribution of this group of bees. The species epithet is named after the Muisca goddess Bachué. The Muisca people inhabited the area where the species has been found; Cundinamarca and Boyacá.

== Description ==
The body is predominantly dark brown to black with reduced yellow maculations; forewing with two submarginal cells. The females are small to moderate-sized bees (4–12 mm in length). Males are longer than the females and have sparser body pubescence.

== Other species in this subgenus ==
- Protandrena amyae
- Protandrena femoralis
- Protandrena guarnensis
- Protandrena maximina
- Protandrena rangeli
- Protandrena wayruronga
