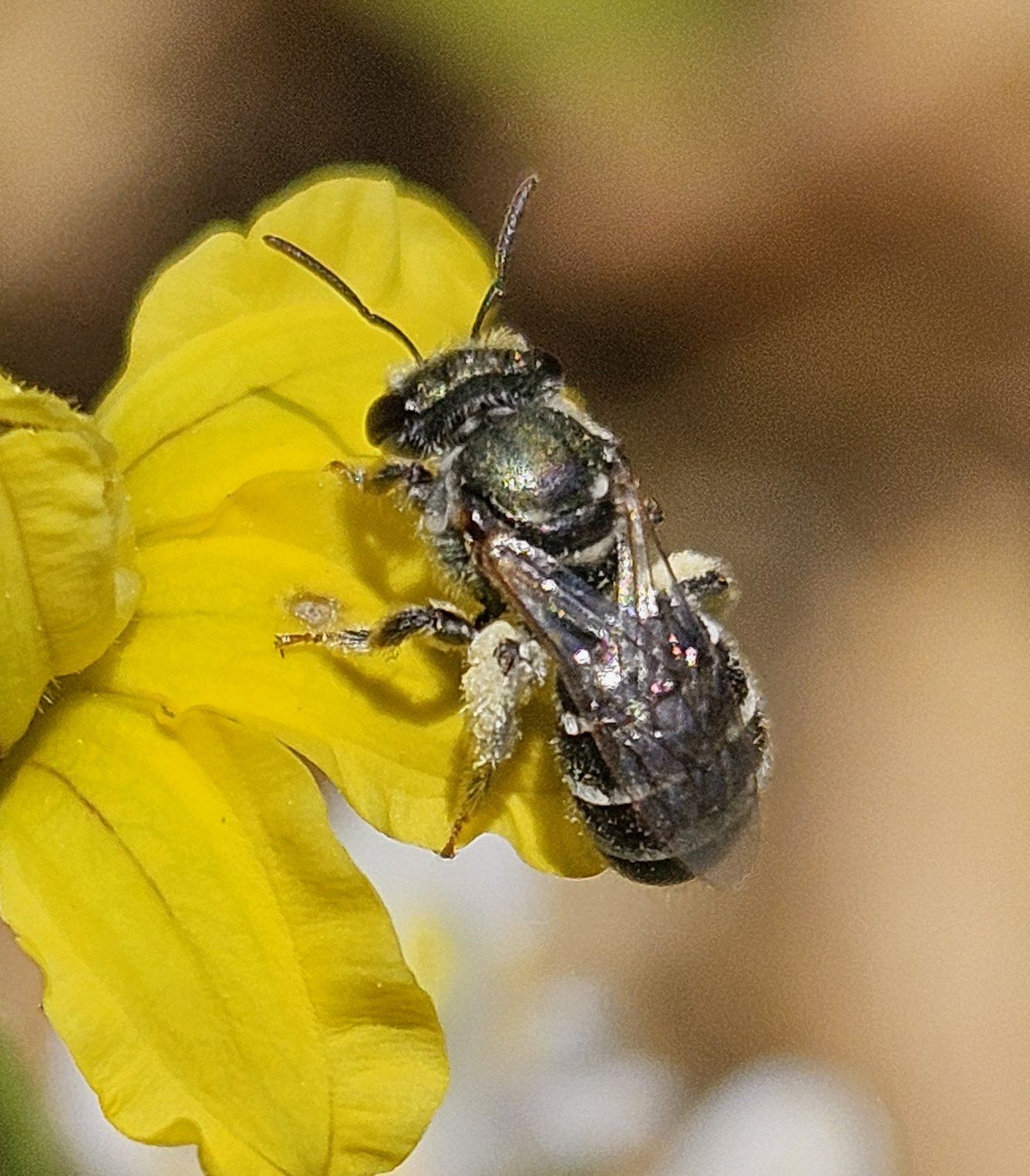
- Female with pollen on hind legs.

Scientific classification
- Kingdom: Animalia
- Phylum: Arthropoda
- Clade: Pancrustacea
- Class: Insecta
- Order: Hymenoptera
- Family: Halictidae
- Genus: Lipotriches
- Species: L. flavoviridis

Binomial name
- Lipotriches flavoviridis (Cockerell, 1905)

= Lipotriches flavoviridis =

Species of bee

Lipotriches flavoviridis is a species of bee in the family Halictidae. It was first described by Theodore Cockerell in 1905. It is found in mainland Australia, as well as Indonesia, Papua New Guinea and Solomon Islands. It ranges in colour from dark metallic green to shiny gold, occasionally with crimson iridescence. They are approximately 7mm long, and the end of the abdomen is red in females. Nesting takes place in underground burrows.

== Taxonomy ==
The male was first described by Theodore Cockerell in 1905, when it was given the name Nomia flavoviridis. The specific name means “yellow-green” in latin, in reference to the yellowish green colour of the head, thorax and much of the abdomen. The type specimen is from Mackay, Queensland.

The female was first described by German entomologist Heinrich Friese in 1912. That type specimen was collected near Sialum, Papua New Guinea, and he named it Nomia aenescens.

Some females collected from the Perth area in Western Australia were named as a new variety by Tarlton Rayment in 1931. He called them Nomia flavoviridis rubra, in reference to the crimson iridescence on the mesothorax.

Subsequent work by American entomologist Charles D. Michener placed the species into the subgenus Austronomia within the genus Lipotriches.

Lipotriches (Austronomia) flavoviridis is considered a species group, as future taxonomic revision is expected to split it into several different species.

== Description ==
This species group ranges in colour from dark metallic green to shiny gold, with a sparse covering of whitish hair. They are approximately 7mm in length. Some specimens have a strong crimson iridescence on the mesothorax.

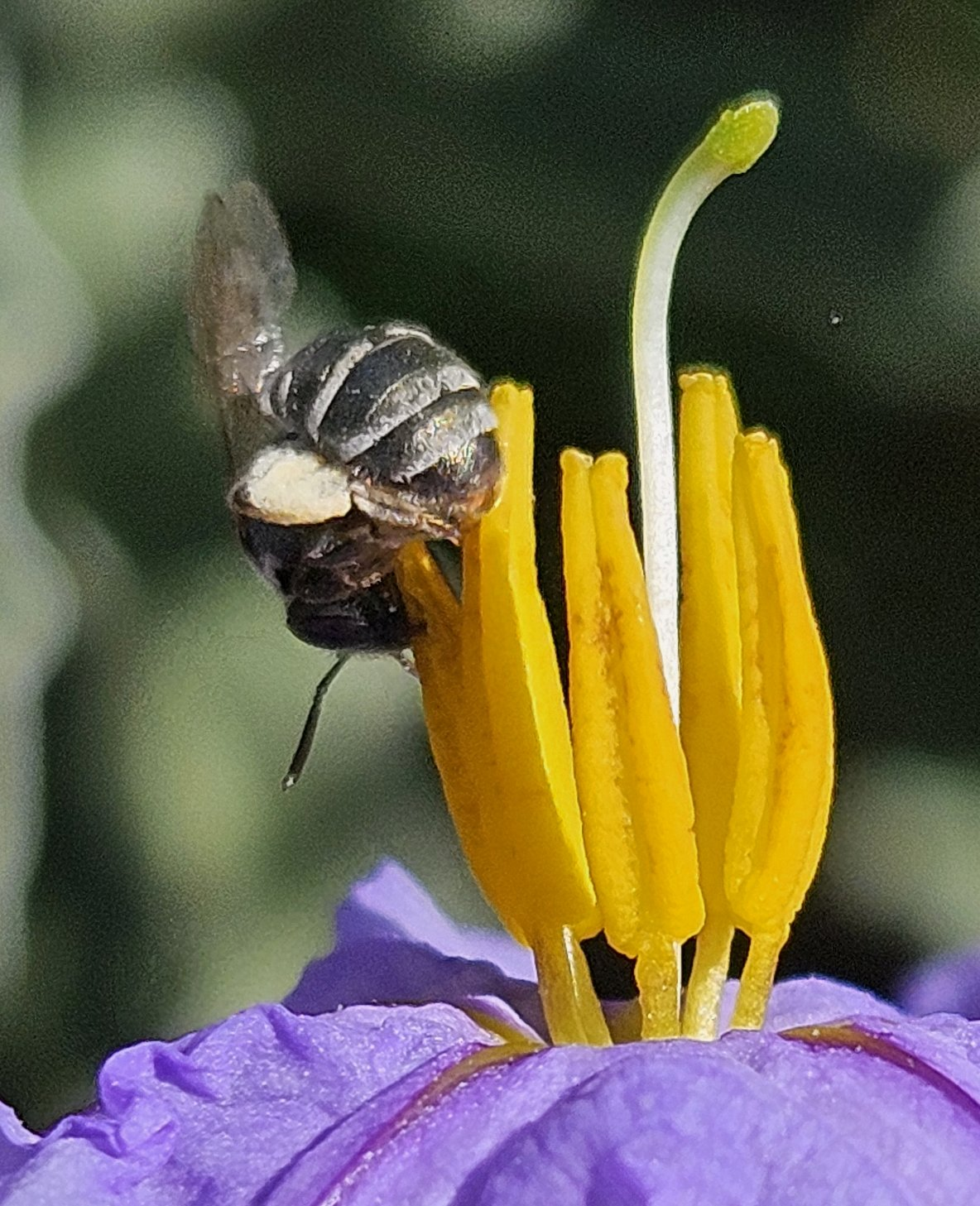
Female with red end of abdomen visible.

The head and thorax are finely and densely punctured. The wings are clear, with brown veins and tegulae. The antennae are black on top and brown beneath, and they are longer in the male. In males, part of the clypeus is pale yellow, whereas in females the clypeus is mostly black.

The legs are covered in white hair, and they have reddish-brown tarsi and white spurs. Males have modified hind legs, with the femora swollen and tibiae broadened. Females have white scopal hairs on the hind legs.

The first abdominal segment has a spot of white hair on each side. The other abdominal segments have a complete band of white hair on the hind margin. In females the end of the abdomen is coloured red.

== Distribution and habitat ==
Lipotriches flavoviridis is found in all Australian states and territories except for Tasmania. It is also found in Indonesia, Papua New Guinea and Solomon Islands.

== Behaviour and ecology ==
This bee visits the flowers of a wide range of plant species. Females collect pollen on the hairs of the hind legs, and nesting takes place in underground burrows. Males can be seen clustering on twigs and stems.
