= Lipotriches edirisinghei =

Scientific classification
- Kingdom: Animalia
- Phylum: Arthropoda
- Class: Insecta
- Order: Hymenoptera
- Family: Halictidae
- Genus: Lipotriches
- Species: L. edirisinghei

Binomial name
- Lipotriches edirisinghei Pauly, 2006

Species of bee

Lipotriches edirisinghei is a species of bee in the genus Lipotriches, of the family Halictidae. It is found in Sri Lanka.
