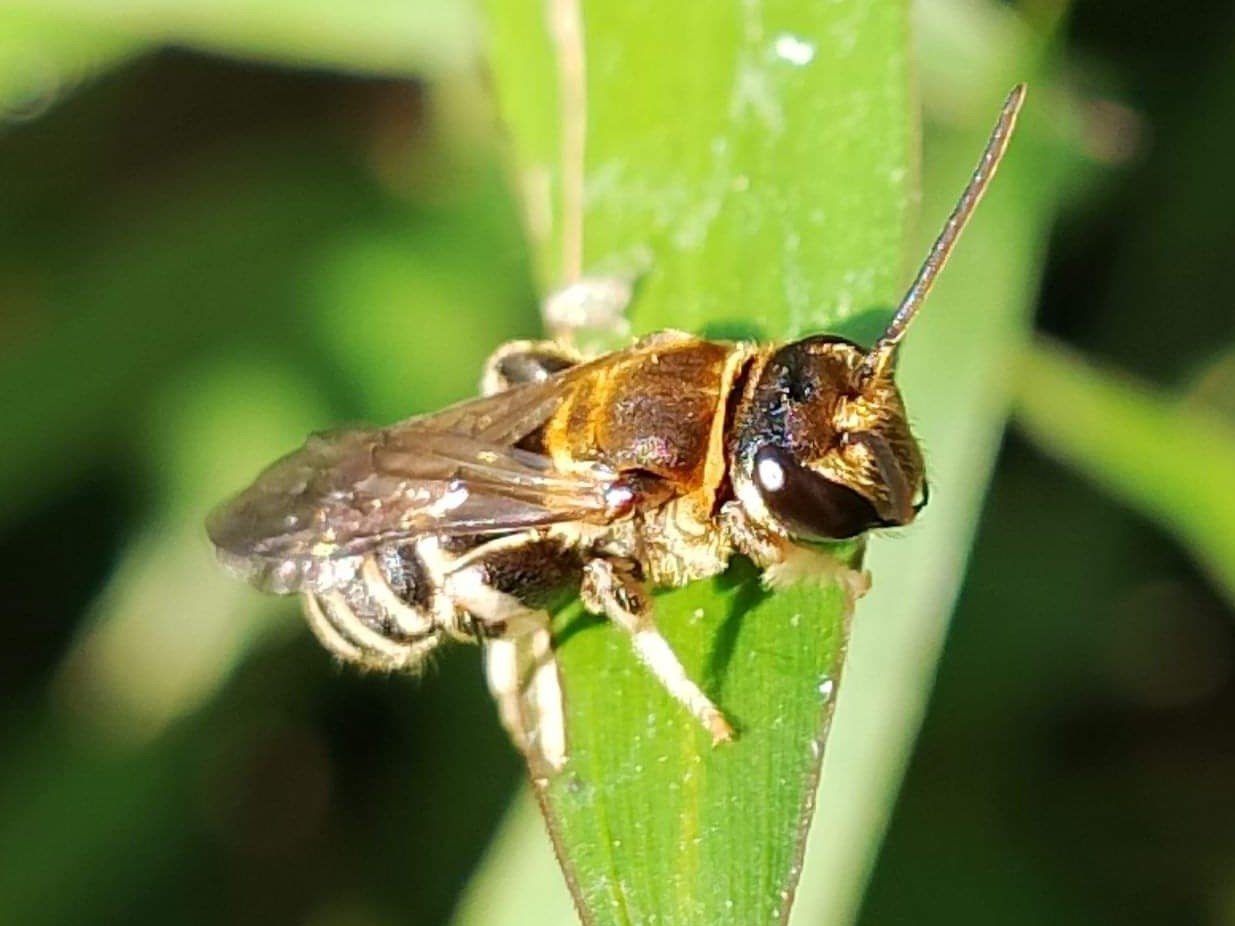

Scientific classification
- Kingdom: Animalia
- Phylum: Arthropoda
- Clade: Pancrustacea
- Class: Insecta
- Order: Hymenoptera
- Family: Halictidae
- Genus: Lipotriches
- Subgenus: Armatriches
- Species: L. fervida

Binomial name
- Lipotriches fervida (Smith, 1875)

Synonyms
- List: Nomia fervida Smith, 1875; Nomia chrysopa Cameron, 1898; Nomia carinicollis Cameron, 1902; Nomia shiva Nurse, 1902; Nomia nursei Cameron, 1907; Nomia abuensis Cameron, 1898; Nomia virgata Cockerell, 1911; Nomia nursei semifortis Cockerell, 1911; Lipotriches (Lipotriches) abuensis (Cameron, 1908)

= Lipotriches fervida =

Species of bee

Lipotriches fervida is a species of bee in the family Halictidae.
