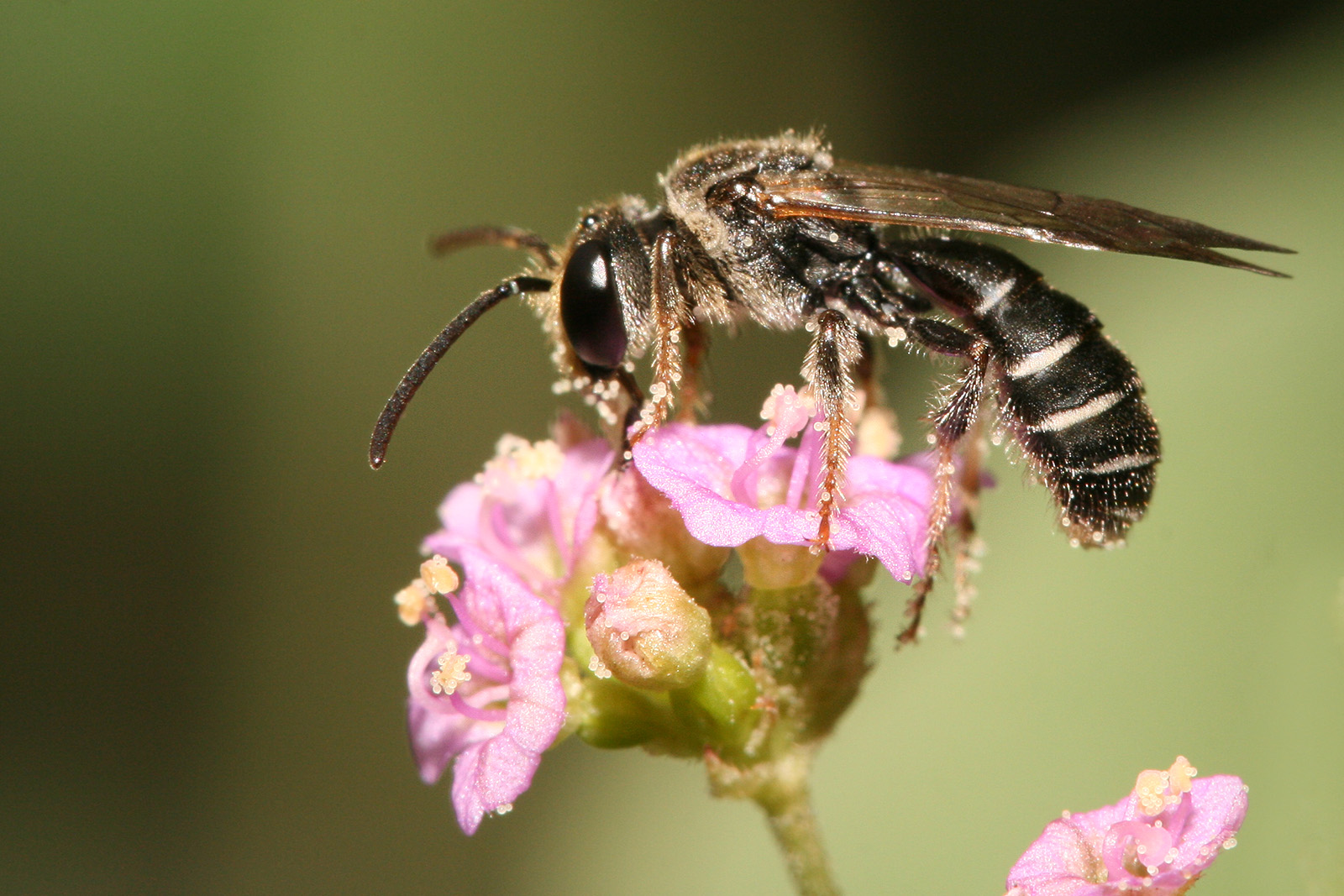
- Lipotriches sp. male

Scientific classification
- Kingdom: Animalia
- Phylum: Arthropoda
- Class: Insecta
- Order: Hymenoptera
- Family: Halictidae
- Subfamily: Nomiinae
- Genus: Lipotriches; Gerstaecker, 1858

Subgenera
- Afronomia Pauly 1990; Austronomia Michener 1965; Clavinomia Warncke 1980; Lipotriches Gerstaecker 1858; Macronomia Cockerell 1917; Maynenomia Pauly 1984; Melanomia Pauly 1990; Nubenomia Pauly 1980; Trinomia Pauly 1980

= Lipotriches =

Genus of bees

Lipotriches is a large genus of sweat bees in the family Halictidae, distributed widely throughout the Eastern Hemisphere though absent from Europe. There are nearly 200 species in 9 subgenera. They commonly have prominent bands of hair on the margins of the metasomal segments.

== Description and biology ==
Members of this genus are important pollinators of plants, especially grasses, in fact 5 species of this genus from South Africa are recorded to gather grass pollen, with four doing so exclusively. They often have more slender bodies relative to other nomiine bees.

== Species ==
- Lipotriches ablusa (Cockerell, 1931)
- Lipotriches acaciae (Cockerell, 1935)
- Lipotriches adelaidella (Cockerell, 1910)
- Lipotriches aenea (Smith, 1875)
- Lipotriches aenescens (Friese, 1912)
- Lipotriches aerata (Smith, 1875)
- Lipotriches alberti (Cockerell, 1942)
- Lipotriches albitarsis (Friese, 1930)
- Lipotriches alboscopacea (Friese, 1917)
- Lipotriches alternata (Cockerell, 1942)
- Lipotriches amatha (Cockerell, 1935)
- Lipotriches analis (Friese, 1924)
- Lipotriches analis (Benoist, 1964)
- Lipotriches andrei (Vachal, 1897)
- Lipotriches antennata (Smith, 1875)
- Lipotriches apicata (Cockerell, 1936)
- Lipotriches argentifrons (Smith, 1862)
- Lipotriches armatipes (Friese, 1930)
- Lipotriches armatula (Dalla Torre, 1896)
- Lipotriches arnoldi (Friese, 1930)
- Lipotriches aurata (Bingham, 1897)
- Lipotriches aureohirta (Cameron, 1898)
- Lipotriches aureotecta (Cockerell, 1931)
- Lipotriches aurifrons (Smith, 1853)
- Lipotriches austella (Hirashima, 1978)
- Lipotriches australica (Smith, 1875)
- Lipotriches azarensis (Cockerell, 1932)
- Lipotriches babindensis (Cockerell, 1930)
- Lipotriches bantarica (Cockerell, 1919)
- Lipotriches basipicta (Wickwar, 1908)
- Lipotriches bechuanella (Cockerell, 1939)
- Lipotriches bequaertiella (Cockerell, 1942)
- Lipotriches betsilei (Saussure, 1890)
- Lipotriches bicarinata (Cameron, 1903)
- Lipotriches bigibba (Saussure, 1890)
- Lipotriches blandula (Vachal, 1903)
- Lipotriches bombayensis (Cameron, 1908)
- Lipotriches brachysoma (Schletterer, 1891)
- Lipotriches brevipennis (Friese, 1915)
- Lipotriches brisbanensis (Cockerell, 1913)
- Lipotriches brooksi (Pauly, 1991)
- Lipotriches burmica (Cockerell, 1920)
- Lipotriches ceratina (Smith, 1857)
- Lipotriches cheesmanae (Michener, 1965)
- Lipotriches chilwensis (Cockerell, 1939)
- Lipotriches cincticauda (Cockerell, 1943)
- Lipotriches cinerascens (Smith, 1875)
- Lipotriches circumnitens (Cockerell, 1946)
- Lipotriches cirrita (Vachal, 1903)
- Lipotriches clavata (Smith, 1853)
- Lipotriches clavicornis (Warncke, 1980)
- Lipotriches clavisetis (Vachal, 1910)
- Lipotriches clypeata (Smith, 1875)
- Lipotriches collaris (Vachal, 1903)
- Lipotriches crassula (Vachal, 1903)
- Lipotriches cribrosa (Spinola, 1843)
- Lipotriches crocodilensis (Pauly, 1990)
- Lipotriches cubitalis (Vachal, 1897)
- Lipotriches cyanella (Cockerell, 1913)
- Lipotriches dentipes (Friese, 1930)
- Lipotriches dentiventris (Smith, 1875)
- Lipotriches derema (Strand, 1914)
- Lipotriches desolata (Cockerell, 1941)
- Lipotriches digitata (Friese, 1909)
- Lipotriches dimissa (Cockerell, 1921)
- Lipotriches doddii (Cockerell, 1905)
- Lipotriches dominarum (Cockerell, 1932)
- Lipotriches echinata (Friese, 1930)
- Lipotriches edirisinghei Pauly, 2006
- Lipotriches elongata (Friese, 1914)
- Lipotriches elongatula (Cockerell, 1915)
- Lipotriches erimae (Friese, 1909)
- Lipotriches esakii (Hirashima, 1961)
- Lipotriches ethioparca (Cockerell, 1935)
- Lipotriches exagens (Walker, 1860)
- Lipotriches excellens (Cockerell, 1929)
- Lipotriches femorata (Friese, 1936)
- Lipotriches ferricauda (Cockerell, 1913)
- Lipotriches fervida (Smith, 1875)
- Lipotriches fimbriata (Vachal, 1897)
- Lipotriches flavitarsis (Friese, 1909)
- Lipotriches flavoviridis (Cockerell, 1905)
- Lipotriches floralis (Smith, 1875)
- Lipotriches fortior (Cockerell, 1929)
- Lipotriches frenchi (Cockerell, 1912)
- Lipotriches friesei (Magretti, 1899)
- Lipotriches fruhstorferi (Pérez, 1905)
- Lipotriches fulvinerva (Cameron, 1907)
- Lipotriches fulvohirta (Smith, 1875)
- Lipotriches fumipennis (Pauly, 2001)
- Lipotriches generosa (Smith, 1875)
- Lipotriches geophila (Cockerell, 1930)
- Lipotriches gilberti (Cockerell, 1905)
- Lipotriches goniognatha (Cockerell, 1919)
- Lipotriches gracilipes (Smith, 1875)
- Lipotriches gratiosa (Friese, 1914)
- Lipotriches grisella (Cockerell, 1913)
- Lipotriches (Lipotriches) guihongi (Zhang et al, 2022)
- Lipotriches guineensis (Strand, 1912)
- Lipotriches guluensis (Cockerell, 1943)
- Lipotriches halictella (Cockerell, 1905)
- Lipotriches hippophila (Cockerell, 1910)
- Lipotriches hirsutissima (Cockerell, 1935)
- Lipotriches hirsutula (Cockerell, 1947)
- Lipotriches hylaeoides (Gerstäcker, 1857)
- Lipotriches hypodonta (Cockerell, 1905)
- Lipotriches inaequalis (Cockerell, 1931)
- Lipotriches inamoena (Benoist, 1950)
- Lipotriches jacobsoni (Friese, 1914)
- Lipotriches johannis (Cockerell, 1946)
- Lipotriches kabindana (Strand, 1920)
- Lipotriches kamerunensis (Friese, 1916)
- Lipotriches kampalana (Cockerell, 1935)
- Lipotriches kangrae (Nurse, 1904)
- Lipotriches kankauana (Strand, 1913)
- Lipotriches kasoutina (Cockerell, 1943)
- Lipotriches katonana (Strand, 1913)
- Lipotriches kondeana (Strand, 1913)
- Lipotriches krombeini (Hirashima, 1978)
- Lipotriches kurandina (Cockerell, 1910)
- Lipotriches lactinea (Vachal, 1903)
- Lipotriches lamellicornis (Friese, 1911)
- Lipotriches langi (Cockerell, 1932)
- Lipotriches latetibialis (Friese, 1924)
- Lipotriches latifacies (Strand, 1911)
- Lipotriches lautula (Cockerell, 1919)
- Lipotriches leucomelanura (Cockerell, 1935)
- Lipotriches ligata (Vachal, 1903)
- Lipotriches lubumbashica (Cockerell, 1943)
- Lipotriches lucidula (Vachal, 1910)
- Lipotriches luridipes (Benoist, 1964)
- Lipotriches maai (Michener, 1965)
- Lipotriches macropus (Friese, 1930)
- Lipotriches magniventris (Friese, 1914)
- Lipotriches makomensis (Strand, 1912)
- Lipotriches meadewaldoi (Brauns, 1912)
- Lipotriches medani (Cockerell, 1942)
- Lipotriches media (Benoist, 1964)
- Lipotriches mediorufa (Cockerell, 1912)
- Lipotriches melanodonta (Cockerell, 1926)
- Lipotriches melanoptera (Cockerell, 1910)
- Lipotriches melanosoma (Benoist, 1964)
- Lipotriches melvilliana (Cockerell, 1929)
- Lipotriches minuta (Benoist, 1964)
- Lipotriches minutula (Friese, 1909)
- Lipotriches miranda (Rayment, 1954)
- Lipotriches modesta (Smith, 1862)
- Lipotriches moerens (Smith, 1875)
- Lipotriches mollis (Smith, 1879)
- Lipotriches montana (Friese, 1930)
- Lipotriches montana (Ebmer, 1978)
- Lipotriches morata (Cockerell, 1920)
- Lipotriches mozambensis (Pauly, 2003)
- Lipotriches muscosa (Cockerell, 1910)
- Lipotriches musgravei (Cockerell, 1929)
- Lipotriches nana (Smith, 1875)
- Lipotriches (Maynenomia) nanensis (Cockerell, 1929)
- Lipotriches natalensis (Cockerell, 1916)
- Lipotriches negligenda (Dalla Torre, 1896)
- Lipotriches nigra (Wu, 1985)
- Lipotriches nitidibasis (Cockerell, 1920)
- Lipotriches notabilis (Schletterer, 1891)
- Lipotriches notiomorpha (Hirashima, 1978)
- Lipotriches nubecula (Smith, 1875)
- Lipotriches nubilosa (Cockerell, 1942)
- Lipotriches nuda (Rayment, 1939)
- Lipotriches oberthuerella (Saussure, 1890)
- Lipotriches obscura (Benoist, 1964)
- Lipotriches odontostoma (Cockerell, 1941)
- Lipotriches opacibasis (Cockerell, 1935)
- Lipotriches orientalis (Friese, 1909)
- Lipotriches pachypoda (Cockerell, 1920)
- Lipotriches palavanica (Cockerell, 1915)
- Lipotriches pallidibasis (Cockerell, 1936)
- Lipotriches pallidicincta (Cockerell, 1932)
- Lipotriches pallidiventer (Cockerell, 1943)
- Lipotriches panganina (Strand, 1911)
- Lipotriches parca (Kohl, 1906)
- Lipotriches patellifera (Westwood, 1875)
- Lipotriches pennata (Friese, 1924)
- Lipotriches perlucida (Cockerell, 1911)
- Lipotriches petterssoni (Pauly, 1991)
- Lipotriches phanerura (Cockerell, 1913)
- Lipotriches phenacura (Cockerell, 1911)
- Lipotriches philippinensis (Cockerell, 1915)
- Lipotriches picardi (Gribodo, 1894)
- Lipotriches pilipes (Smith, 1875)
- Lipotriches platycephala (Cockerell, 1917)
- Lipotriches pristis (Vachal, 1903)
- Lipotriches pseudohalictella (Strand, 1913)
- Lipotriches pulchricornis (Cockerell, 1943)
- Lipotriches pulchriventris (Cameron, 1897)
- Lipotriches purnongensis (Cockerell, 1913)
- Lipotriches quartinae (Gribodo, 1884)
- Lipotriches raialii (Pauly, 2001)
- Lipotriches rainandriamampandryi (Pauly, 2001)
- Lipotriches ranomafanae (Pauly, 2001)
- Lipotriches reginae (Cockerell, 1905)
- Lipotriches regis (Cockerell, 1910)
- Lipotriches reichardia (Strand, 1911)
- Lipotriches rubella (Smith, 1875)
- Lipotriches rufipes (Smith, 1875)
- Lipotriches rufocognita (Cockerell, 1905)
- Lipotriches rugicollis (Friese, 1930)
- Lipotriches rustica (Westwood, 1875)
- Lipotriches ruwenzorica (Cockerell, 1935)
- Lipotriches sanguinolenta (Friese, 1930)
- Lipotriches sansibarica (Strand, 1912)
- Lipotriches satelles (Cockerell, 1912)
- Lipotriches saussurei (Friese, 1902)
- Lipotriches schroederi (Strand, 1914)
- Lipotriches scutellata (Smith, 1875)
- Lipotriches semiaurea (Cockerell, 1905)
- Lipotriches semihirta (Cockerell, 1932)
- Lipotriches semipallida (Cockerell, 1905)
- Lipotriches senegalicola (Strand, 1912)
- Lipotriches setulosa (Benoist, 1962)
- Lipotriches shanganiensis (Cockerell, 1935)
- Lipotriches sicheli (Vachal, 1897)
- Lipotriches sikorai (Pauly, 1991)
- Lipotriches sjoestedti (Friese, 1909)
- Lipotriches smaragdula (Pauly, 1984)
- Lipotriches speciosana (Strand, 1913)
- Lipotriches speculina (Cockerell, 1942)
- Lipotriches sphecodoides (Pauly, 1991)
- Lipotriches spinulifera (Cockerell, 1933)
- Lipotriches stalkeri (Cockerell, 1910)
- Lipotriches stordyi (Cockerell, 1943)
- Lipotriches subarmata (Cockerell, 1943)
- Lipotriches subaustralica (Cockerell, 1910)
- Lipotriches sublucens (Cockerell, 1939)
- Lipotriches submoerens (Cockerell, 1914)
- Lipotriches subnitida (Benoist, 1964)
- Lipotriches swalei (Cockerell, 1939)
- Lipotriches tampoloensis (Pauly, 1991)
- Lipotriches tanganyicensis (Strand, 1913)
- Lipotriches tenuihirta (Cockerell, 1905)
- Lipotriches testacea (Strand, 1913)
- Lipotriches testaceipes (Friese, 1924)
- Lipotriches tetraloniformis (Strand, 1912)
- Lipotriches thor (Cockerell, 1930)
- Lipotriches torrida (Smith, 1879)
- Lipotriches tridentata (Smith, 1875)
- Lipotriches triodonta (Kohl, 1906)
- Lipotriches tristemmae (Pauly, 2001)
- Lipotriches trochanterica (Friese, 1908)
- Lipotriches tuckeri (Friese, 1930)
- Lipotriches tulearensis (Benoist, 1962)
- Lipotriches turneri (Friese, 1924)
- Lipotriches ulongensis (Cockerell, 1929)
- Lipotriches umbiloensis (Cockerell, 1916)
- Lipotriches ustula (Cockerell, 1911)
- Lipotriches vicina (Stadelmann, 1897)
- Lipotriches viciniformis (Cockerell, 1939)
- Lipotriches victoriae (Cockerell, 1910)
- Lipotriches voeltzkowi (Friese, 1907)
- Lipotriches vulpina (Gerstäcker, 1857)
- Lipotriches welwitschi (Cockerell, 1908)
- Lipotriches whitfieldi (Cockerell, 1942)
- Lipotriches willeyi (Cameron, 1905)
- Lipotriches williamsi (Cockerell, 1930)
- Lipotriches yapiensis (Cockerell, 1943)
- Lipotriches yasumatsui (Hirashima, 1961)
- Lipotriches yunnanensis (He & Wu, 1985)
- Lipotriches zuala (Strand, 1911)
