= Pseudopanurgus andrenoides =

Scientific classification
- Kingdom: Animalia
- Phylum: Arthropoda
- Class: Insecta
- Order: Hymenoptera
- Family: Andrenidae
- Genus: Pseudopanurgus
- Species: P. andrenoides

Binomial name
- Pseudopanurgus andrenoides Spinola, 1808

Species of insect

Pseudopanurgus andrenoides is a species of miner bee in the family Andrenidae. It is found in North America.
