= Lipotriches basipicta =

Scientific classification
- Domain: Eukaryota
- Kingdom: Animalia
- Phylum: Arthropoda
- Class: Insecta
- Order: Hymenoptera
- Family: Halictidae
- Genus: Lipotriches
- Subgenus: Lipotriches
- Species: L. basipicta

Binomial name
- Lipotriches basipicta (Wickwar, 1908)

Synonyms
- Nomia comberi; Nomia butteli; Nomia elegantula; Nomia basipicta; Lipotriches comberi; Lipotriches butteli; Lipotriches elegantula

Species of bee

Lipotriches basipicta is a species of bee in the family Halictidae.
