= Lipotriches rubella =

Scientific classification
- Kingdom: Animalia
- Phylum: Arthropoda
- Class: Insecta
- Order: Hymenoptera
- Family: Halictidae
- Genus: Lipotriches
- Species: L. rubella

Binomial name
- Lipotriches rubella (Smith, 1875)

Synonyms
- List: Nomia pulchritarsis; Nomia rubella Smith; Nomia rubella subsp. jonesi Cockerell, 1939; Nomia rubella subsp. matopicola Cockerell, 1939; Nomia rubella subsp. neavei Cockerell, 1939; Rhopalomelissa jonesi (Cockerell); Rhopalomelissa neavei (Cockerell); Rhopalomelissa rubella (Smith)

Species of bee

Lipotriches rubella, or red-tailed small-nomia, is a species of bee in the family Halictidae. It has been found in Chad as well as western, eastern and southern Africa.
