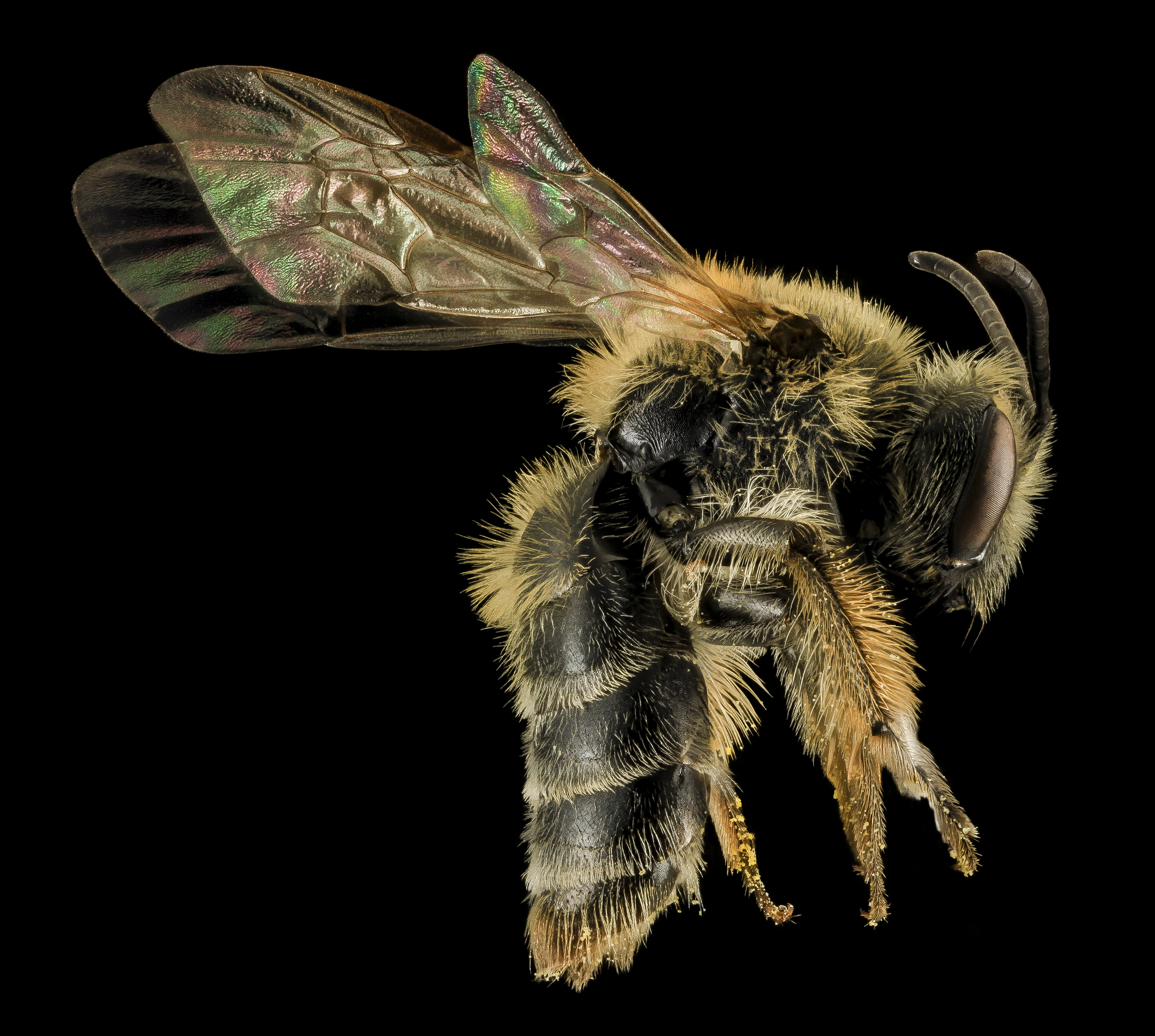

Scientific classification
- Domain: Eukaryota
- Kingdom: Animalia
- Phylum: Arthropoda
- Class: Insecta
- Order: Hymenoptera
- Family: Andrenidae
- Genus: Andrena
- Species: A. cornelli

Binomial name
- Andrena cornelli Viereck, 1907

= Andrena cornelli =

Species of bee

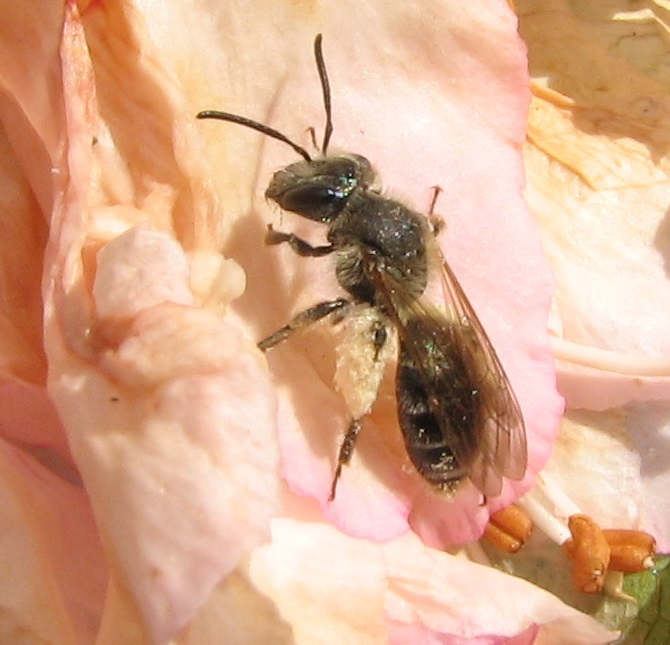
Female on azalea flower

Andrena cornelli, the azalea miner, is a species of mining bee in the family Andrenidae. It is found in North America. The only bee species oligolectic on azalea (Rhododendron spp.) with widely spaced scopa hairs that can carry the type of pollen of these plants.
