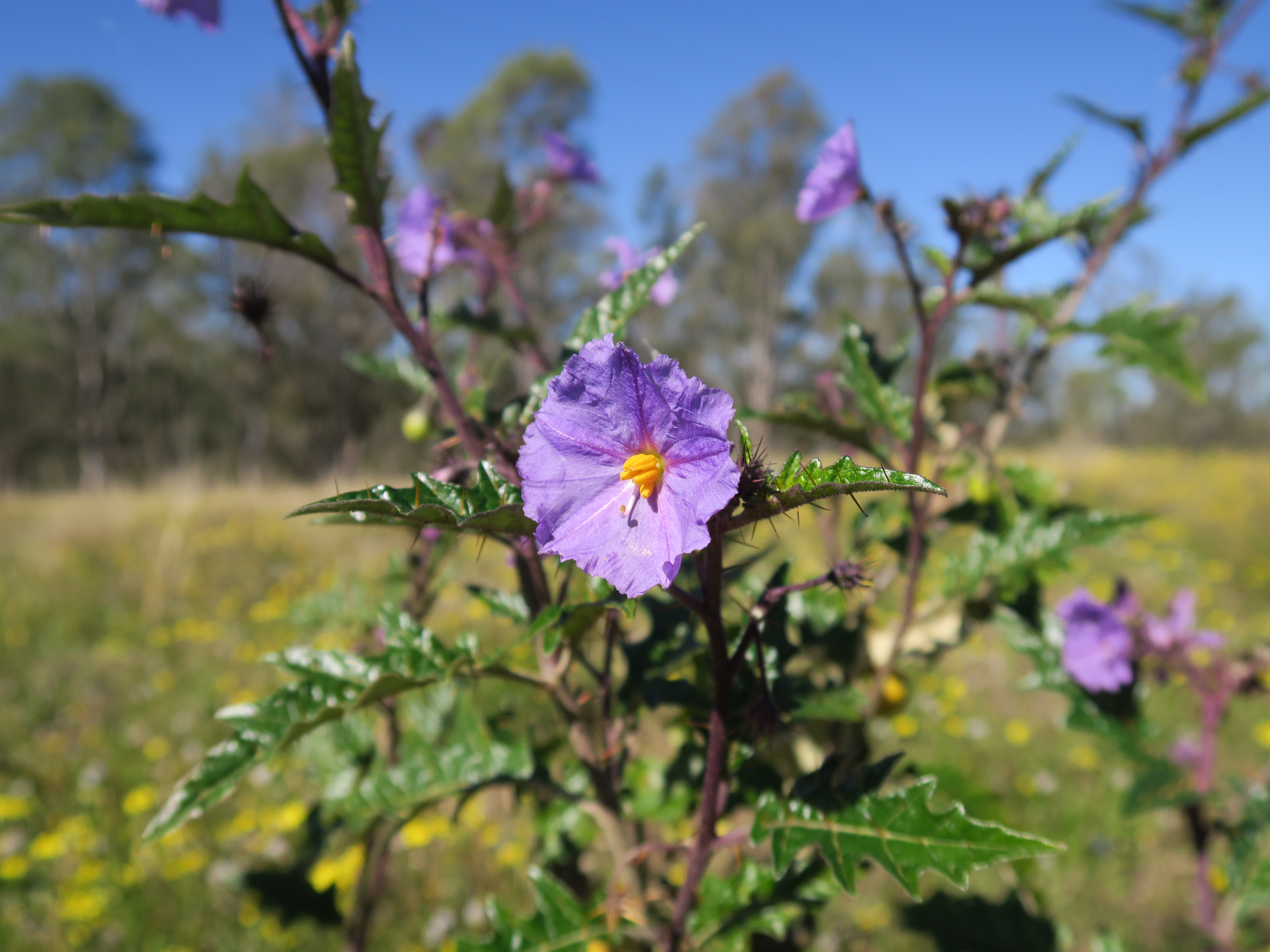

Scientific classification
- Kingdom: Plantae
- Clade: Tracheophytes
- Clade: Angiosperms
- Clade: Eudicots
- Clade: Asterids
- Order: Solanales
- Family: Solanaceae
- Genus: Solanum
- Species: S. cinereum

Binomial name
- Solanum cinereum R.Br.

= Solanum cinereum =

Narrawa burr

Species of flowering plant

Solanum cinereum, commonly known as Narrawa burr, is a species of flowering plant in the family Solanaceae. It has dark green, spiny leaves and purple flowers and grows in open woodland in south eastern Australia.

== Description ==
Solanum cinereum is a small, upright, sparse, sprawling or bushy, perennial shrub to 1 m (3 ft 3 in) high. The leaves are oval to elliptic shaped, 6–10 cm (2.4–3.9 in) long, 3–6 cm (1.2–2.4 in) wide, heavily lobed, shiny, smooth, upper surface dark green, with conspicuous, long, spiny thorns to 15 mm (0.59 in) long, lower surface whitish to light yellow, covered densely with small star-shaped hairs and the petiole 5–15 mm (0.20–0.59 in) long. The flowers are borne singly or in small clusters with four yellow stamens, 20–30 mm (0.79–1.18 in) in diameter, mauve to purple on a peduncle usually 2–10 mm (0.079–0.394 in) long. Flowering occurs mostly from spring to autumn and the fruit is a globose-shaped berry, usually 15–20 mm (0.59–0.79 in) in diameter, pale green with darker streaks and turning brown at maturity.

== Taxonomy and naming ==
Solanum cinereum was first formally described in 1810 by Robert Brown and the description was published in Prodromus florae Novae Hollandiae. The specific epithet (cinereum) means "ash-coloured" referring to the lower surface of the leaves.

== Distribution and habitat ==
Narrawa burr grows in woodland, dry forests and disturbed sites in New South Wales, Victoria, Queensland and the Australian Capital Territory. It is considered a weed in farmland, because it is poisonous to sheep, cattle, and possibly horses.
