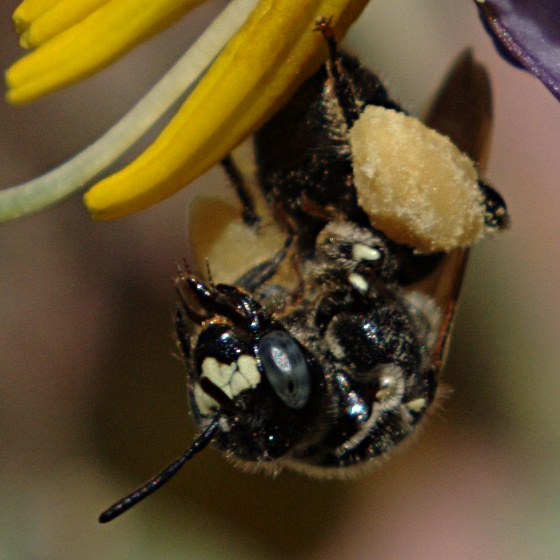
- Protandrena mexicanorum

Scientific classification
- Kingdom: Animalia
- Phylum: Arthropoda
- Clade: Pancrustacea
- Class: Insecta
- Order: Hymenoptera
- Family: Andrenidae
- Subfamily: Panurginae
- Tribe: Protandrenini

= Protandrenini =

Tribe of bees

Protandrenini is a tribe of mining bees in the family Andrenidae. There are about 10 genera and at least 380 described species in Protandrenini.

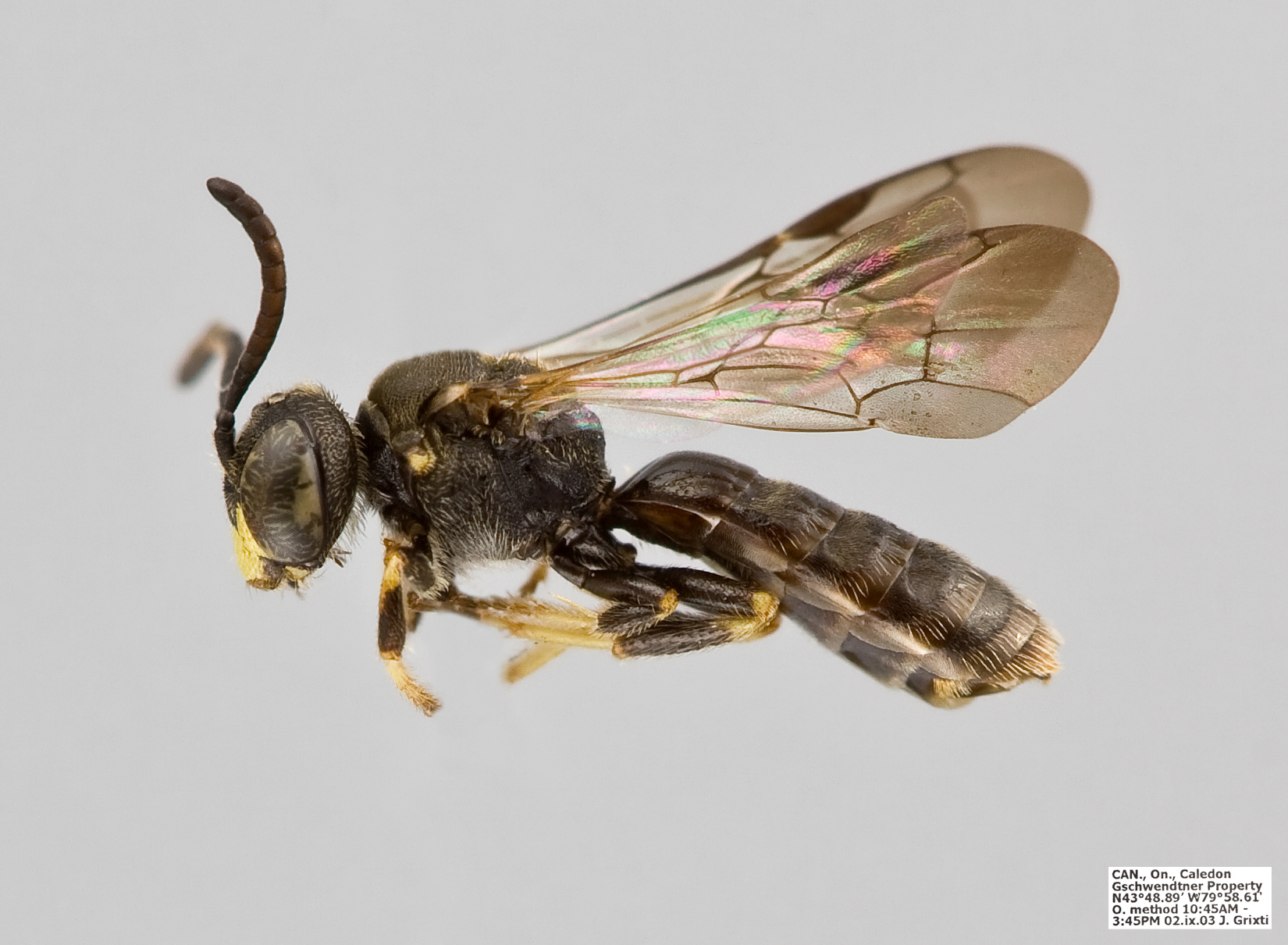
Protandrena (Pterosarus) rudbeckiae

== Genera ==
These 9 genera belong to the tribe Protandrenini (some authors treat subgenera listed under Protandrena as genera):

- Anthrenoides Ducke, 1907
- Chaeturginus Lucas de Oliveira & Moure, 1963
- Liphanthus Reed, 1894
- Neffapis Ruz, 1995
- Parapsaenythia Friese, 1908
- Protandrena Cockerell, 1896
  - Protandrena (Andinopanurgus) Gonzalez & Engel, 2011
  - Protandrena (Anthemurgus) Robertson, 1902
  - Protandrena (Austropanurgus) Toro, 1980
  - Protandrena (Heterosarus)
  - Protandrena (Metapsaenythia)
  - Protandrena (Parasarus)
  - Protandrena (Protandrena) Cockerell, 1896
  - Protandrena (Pseudopanurgus) Cockerell, 1897
  - Protandrena (Pterosarus)
- Psaenythia Gerstäcker, 1868
- Psaenythisca Ramos, 2014
- Rhophitulus Ducke, 1907
