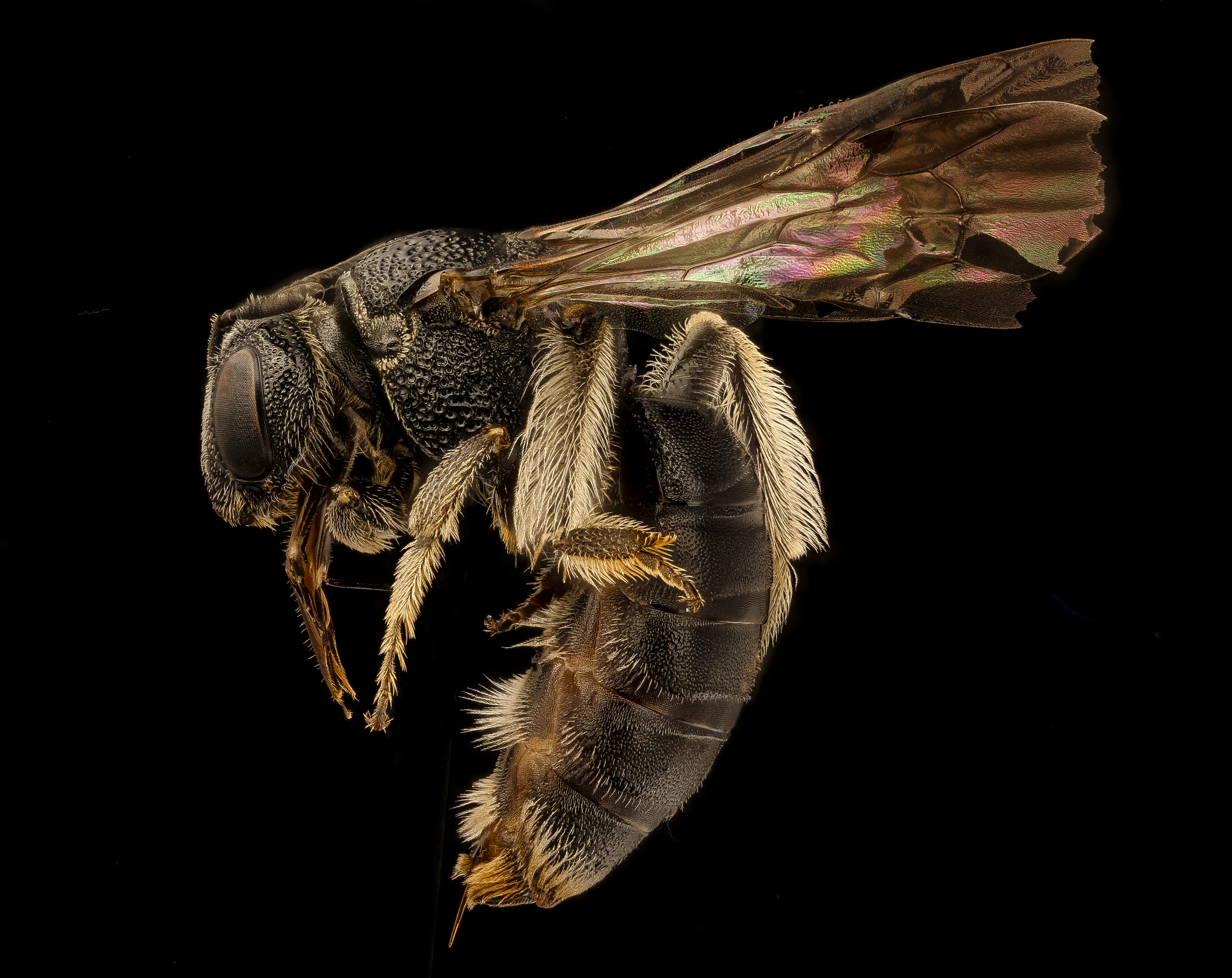
- Pseudopanurgus rugosus, syn. Protandrena (Pseudopanurgus) rugosus

Scientific classification
- Kingdom: Animalia
- Phylum: Arthropoda
- Class: Insecta
- Order: Hymenoptera
- Family: Andrenidae
- Subfamily: Panurginae
- Tribe: Protandrenini
- Genus: Pseudopanurgus; Cockerell, 1897

Diversity
- at least 130 species

= Pseudopanurgus =

Subgenus of insects

Pseudopanurgus is a genus of mining bees in the family Andrenidae. It may also be treated as the subgenus Protandrena (Pseudopanurgus). There are 32 described species in Pseudopanurgus. Pseudopanurgus bees often have 2 submarginal cells in their forewings. Their sizes range from 3 mm to 10 mm.

== See also ==
- List of Pseudopanurgus species
