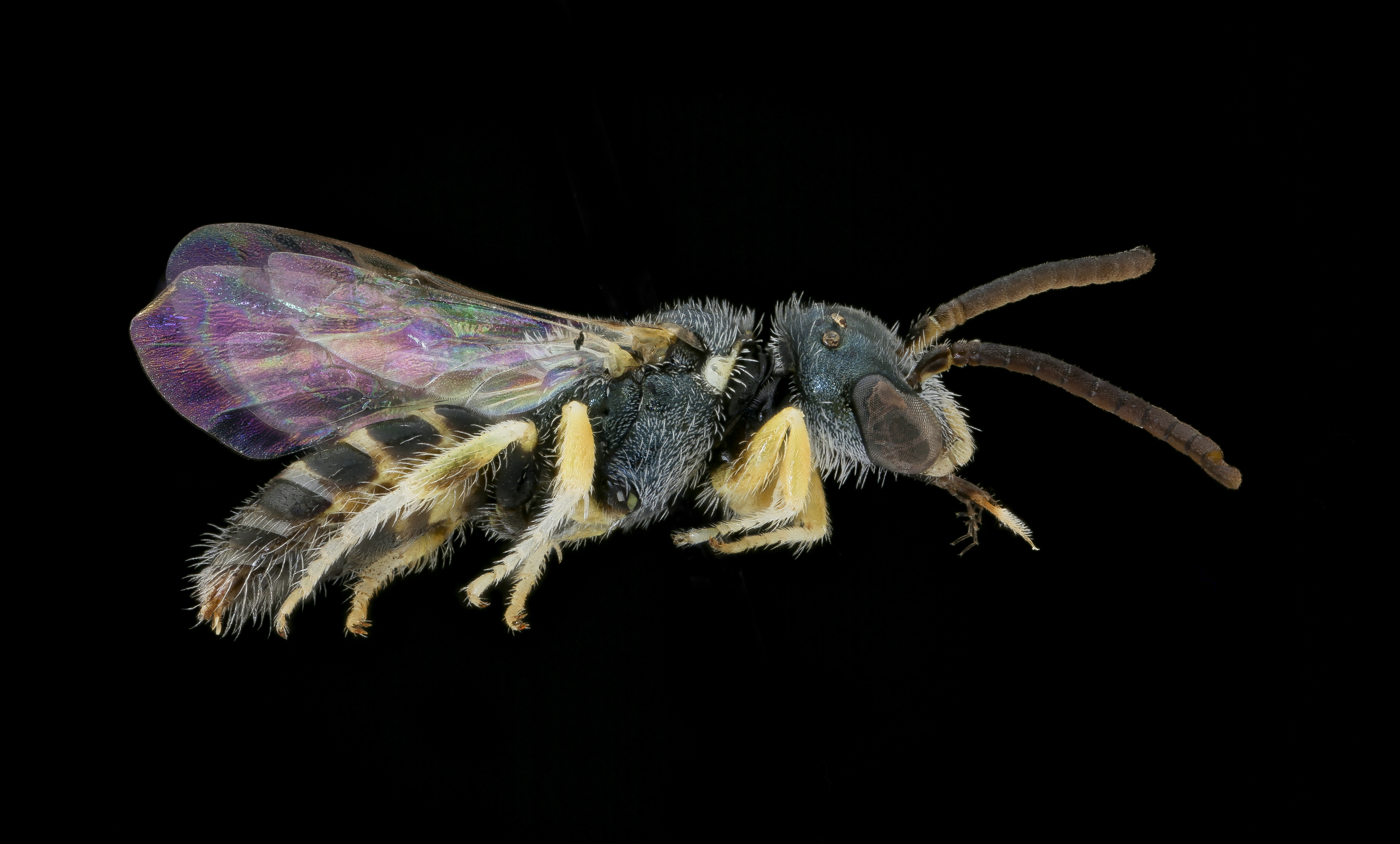
- A male Nomioides minutissimus

Scientific classification
- Kingdom: Animalia
- Phylum: Arthropoda
- Clade: Pancrustacea
- Class: Insecta
- Order: Hymenoptera
- Family: Halictidae
- Subfamily: Nomioidinae
- Genus: Nomioides; Schenck, 1867

= Nomioides =

Genus of bees

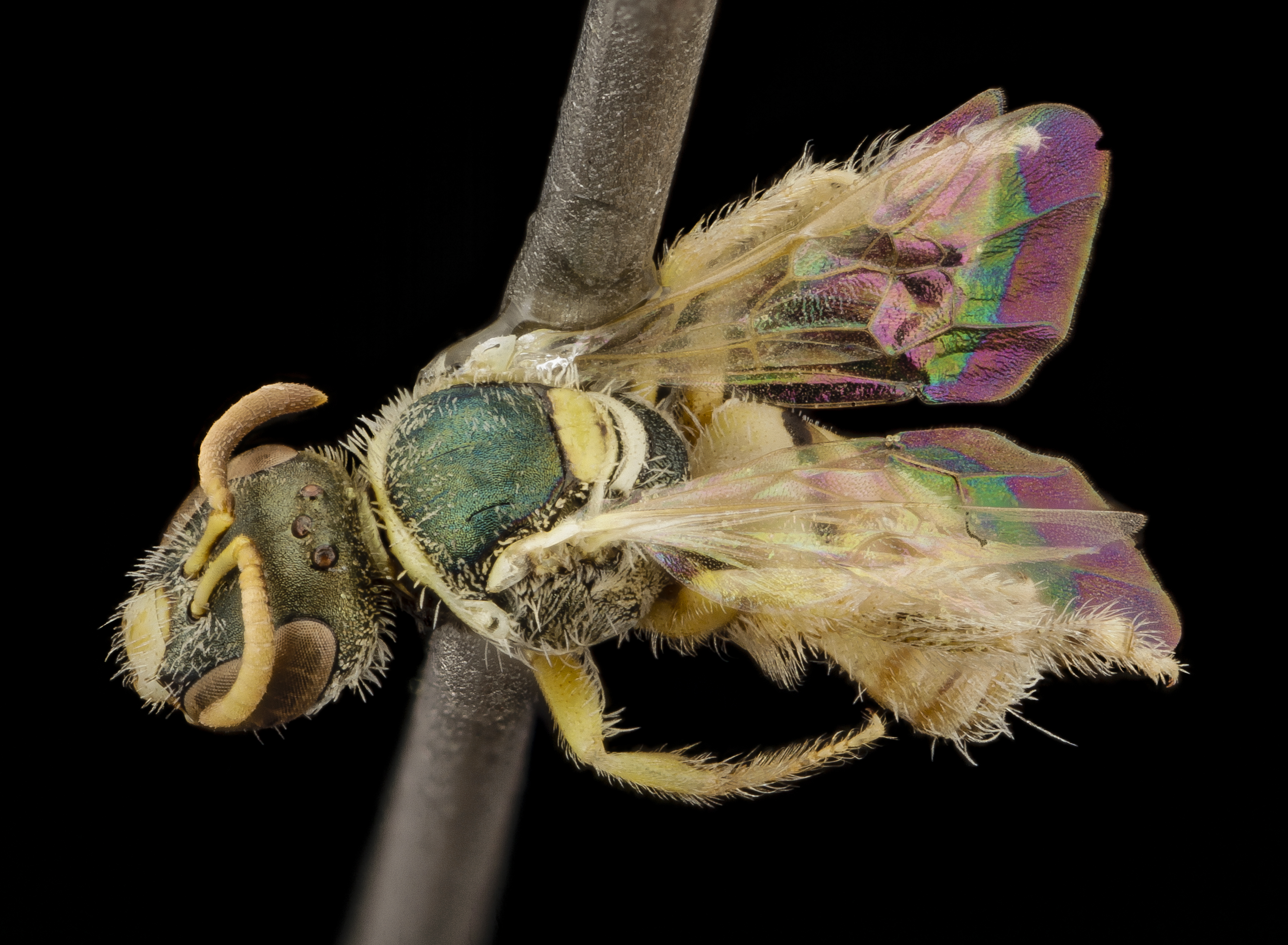
An unidentified Nomioides specimen

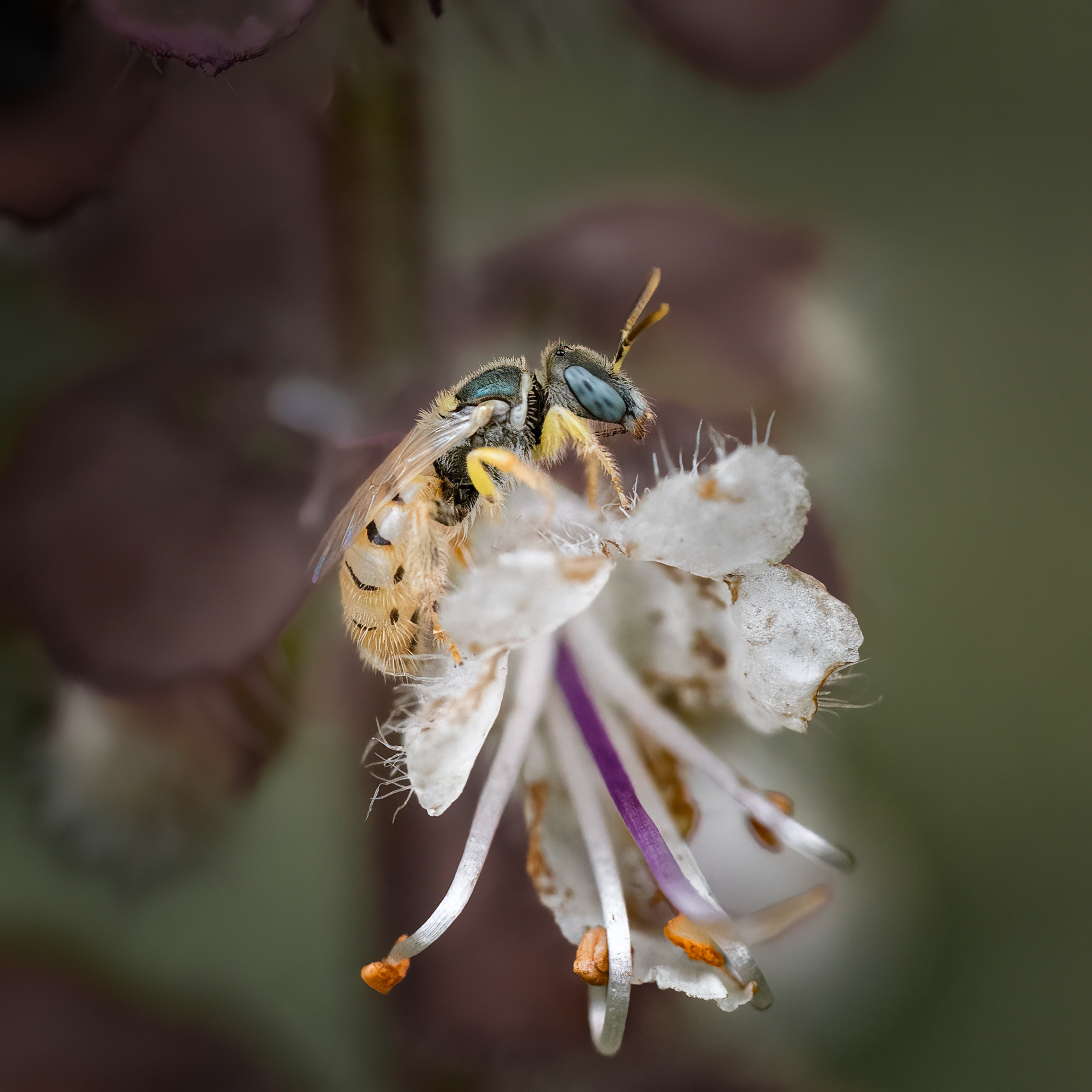
Nomioides minutissimus - female

Nomioides is a genus of bees belonging to the family Halictidae. Bees in this genus are very small and are colored black and yellow.

== Species ==
Species in the genus include:

- Nomioides pulverosus Handlirsch, 1888
- Nomioides facilis (Smith, 1853)
- Nomioides micheneri Pesenko & Pauly, 2005
- Nomioides arabicus Pesenko, 1983
- Nomioides griswoldi Pesenko & Pauly, 2005
- Nomioides nigriceps Blüthgen, 1933
- Nomioides subparviceps Pesenko, 1983
- Nomioides caspicus Blüthgen, 1934
- Nomioides kenyensis Pesenko & Pauly, 2005
- Nomioides pulcherrimus Blüthgen, 1925
- Nomioides elbanus Blüthgen, 1934
- Nomioides maculiventris Cameron, 1905)
- Nomioides similis Pesenko, 1983
- Nomioides galeritus Blüthgen, 1933
- Nomioides subornatus Pesenko, 1983
- Nomioides bluethgeni Pesenko, 1979
- Nomioides iranellus Pesenko, 1983
- Nomioides paulyi Pesenko, 2005
- Nomioides dubius Blüthgen, 1925
- Nomioides longiceps Blüthgen, 1933
- Nomioides schwarzi Pesenko, 1989
- Nomioides fortunatus Blüthgen, 1937
- Nomioides mucoreus Blüthgen, 1933
- Nomioides steinbergi Pesenko, 1983
- Nomioides ino (Nurse, 1904)
- Nomioides patruelis Cockerell, 1919
- Nomioides turanicus Morawitz, 1876
- Nomioides deceptor Saunders, 1908
- Nomioides lahorensis Blüthgen, 1934
- Nomioides feai Vachal, 1894
- Nomioides monticola Pesenko, 1983
- Nomioides squamiger Saunders, 1908
- Nomioides bactriensis Pesenko, 2004
- Nomioides incertus Blüthgen, 1925
- Nomioides parviceps Morawitz, 1876
- Nomioides tobiasi Pesenko, 2004
- Nomioides curvilineatus (Cameron, 1907)
- Nomioides klausi Pesenko, 1983
- Nomioides rotundiceps Handlirsch, 1888
- Nomioides modestus Pesenko, 1977
- Nomioides splendidus Blüthgen, 1925
- Nomioides hybridus Blüthgen, 1934
- Nomioides ornatus Pesenko, 1983
- Nomioides communis Blüthgen, 1934
- Nomioides pusillus Blüthgen, 1925
- Nomioides minutissimus (Rossi, 1790)
- Nomioides socotranus Blüthgen, 1925
- Nomioides atrekensis Pesenko, 2004
- Nomioides gussakovskiji Blüthgen, 1933
- Nomioides tadzhicus Pesenko, 1983
- Nomioides chalybeatus Blüthgen, 1934
- Nomioides variegatus (Olivier)
- Nomioides spec Handlirsch, 1888
