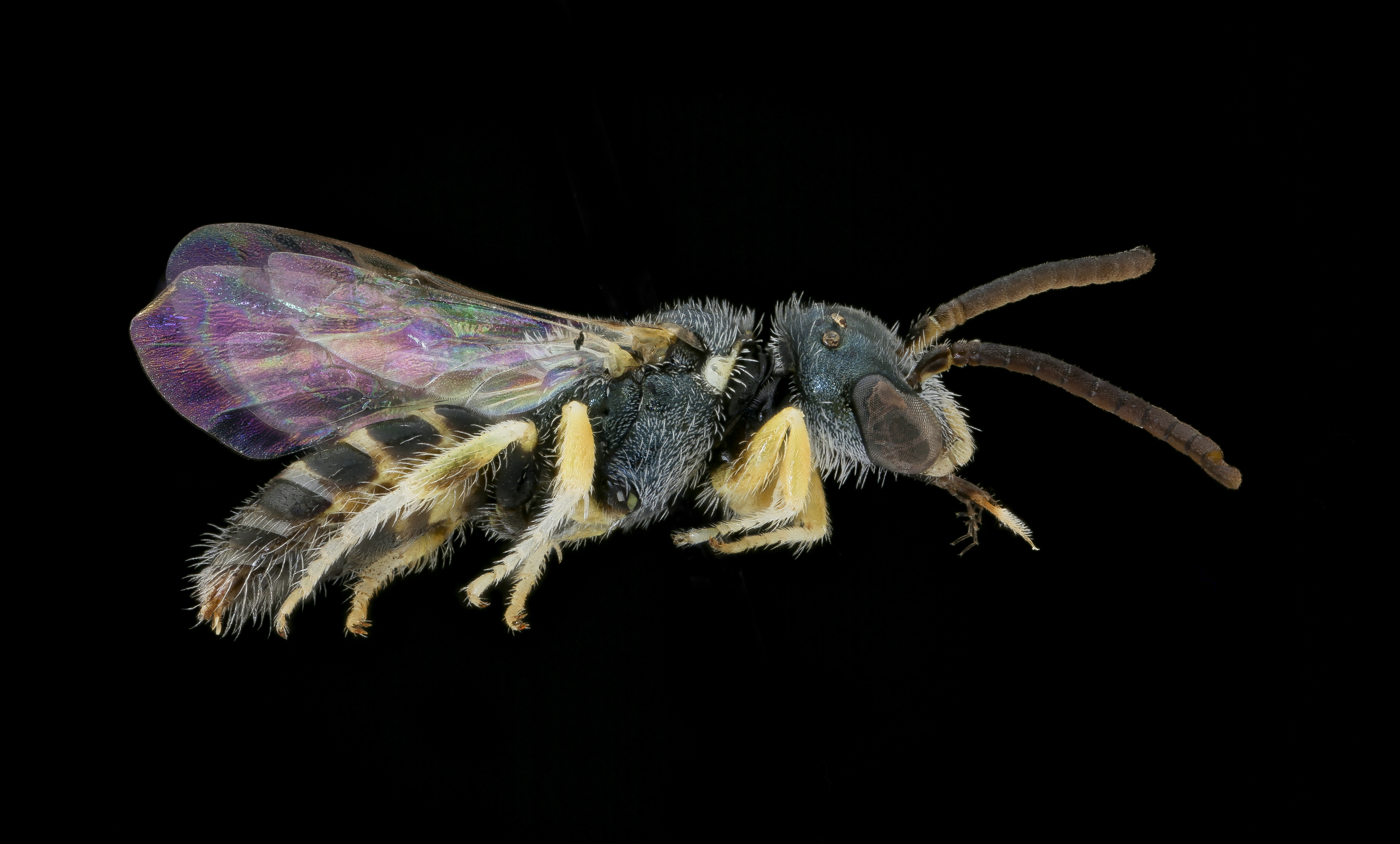
- Male specimen
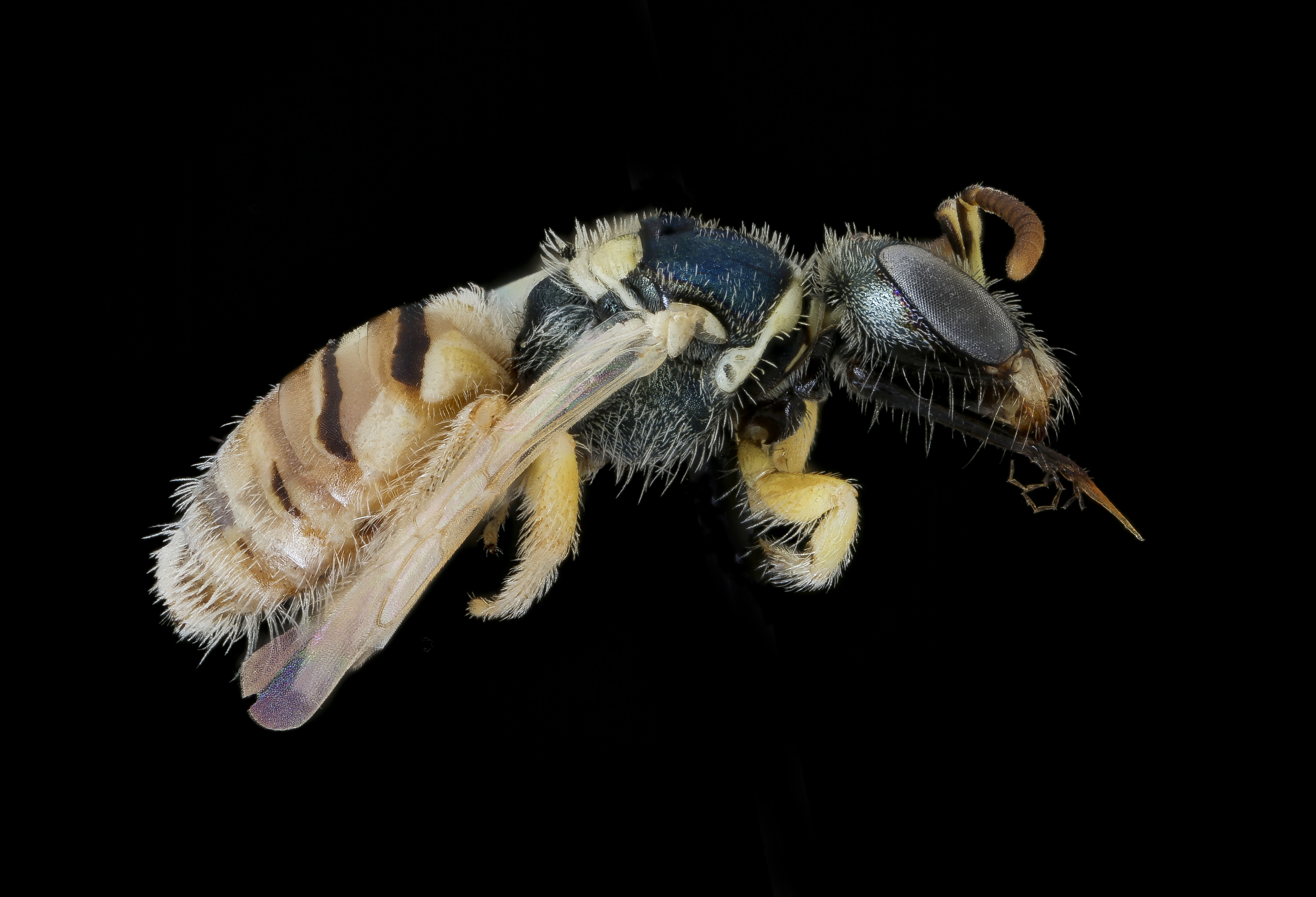
- Female specimen

Scientific classification
- Domain: Eukaryota
- Kingdom: Animalia
- Phylum: Arthropoda
- Class: Insecta
- Order: Hymenoptera
- Family: Halictidae
- Genus: Nomioides
- Species: N. minutissimus

Binomial name
- Nomioides minutissimus (Rossi, 1970)

= Nomioides minutissimus =

Species of bee

Nomioides minutissimus is a species of sweat bee in the family Halictidae. It is found throughout Europe, North Africa and South Asia. As of 2023, it is the only species of Nomioides found in Poland, and is one of the smallest bees in the country.

The species is about 3.5–4.5 mm long, and prefers to live in sandy soil with patches of uncovered sand and flowering plants. It is a polylectic or generalist pollinator, and some of the plants it has been known to visit include Conyza canadensis, Centaurea diffusa, Potentilla argentea, Erigeron annuus, Jasione montana, and various Thymus species, among others. The subspecies N. m. maurus, native to North Africa, has been observed to visit Herniaria fontanesi, Frankenia laevis, and Senecio and Campanula species.

Each bee digs its own nest, which has a circular opening about 2 mm in diameter. Each nest proceeds vertically down for about 13–22 cm until it reaches a lower blind passage. Starting past around 5 cm down, around 6–10 side passages branch off, traveling 1–8 cm laterally while sometimes sloping downwards. Tunnels from the side passages lead directly to the brood cells, which are around 5 mm in their longest diameter.

== Gallery ==
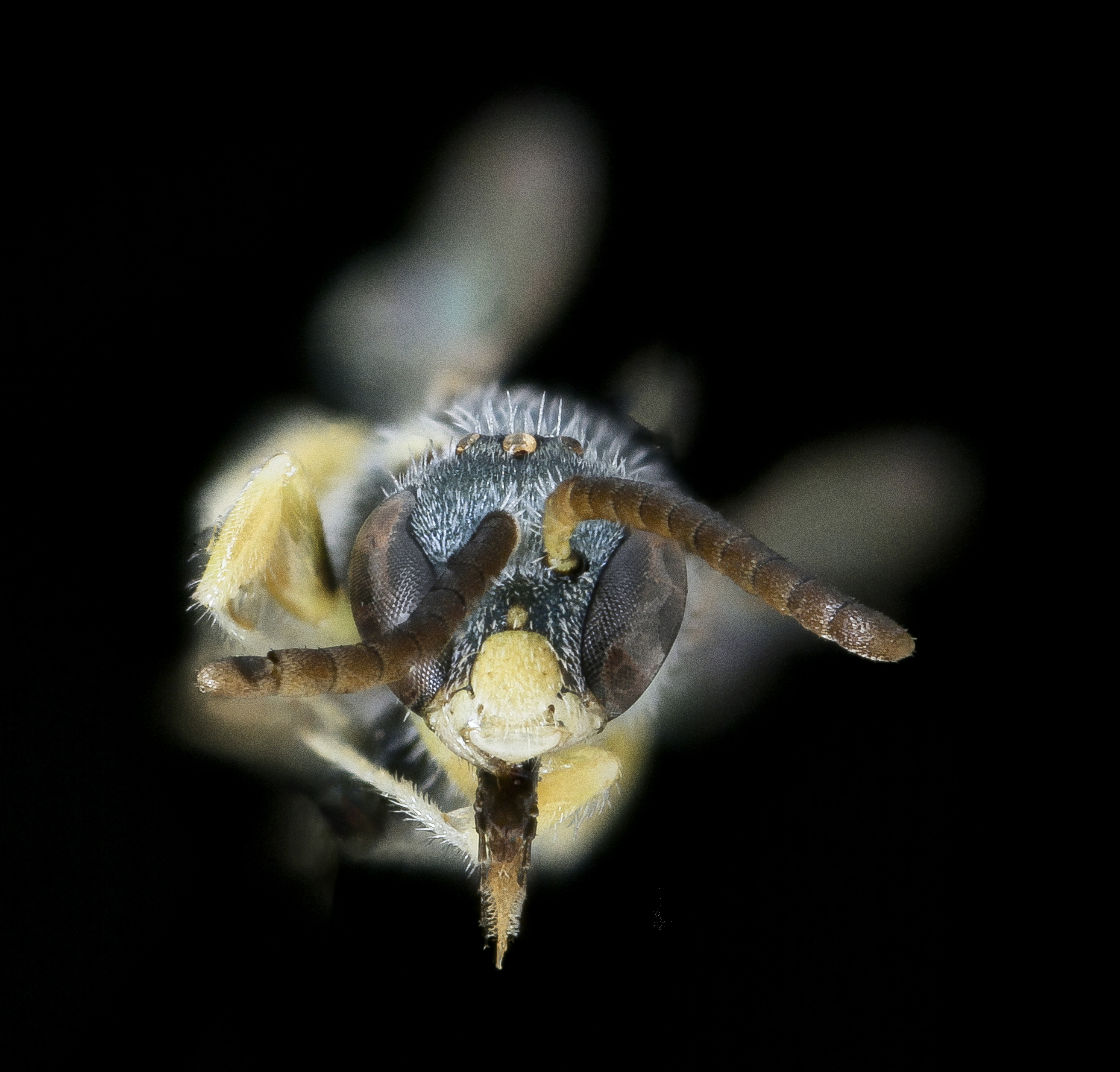
Male front view

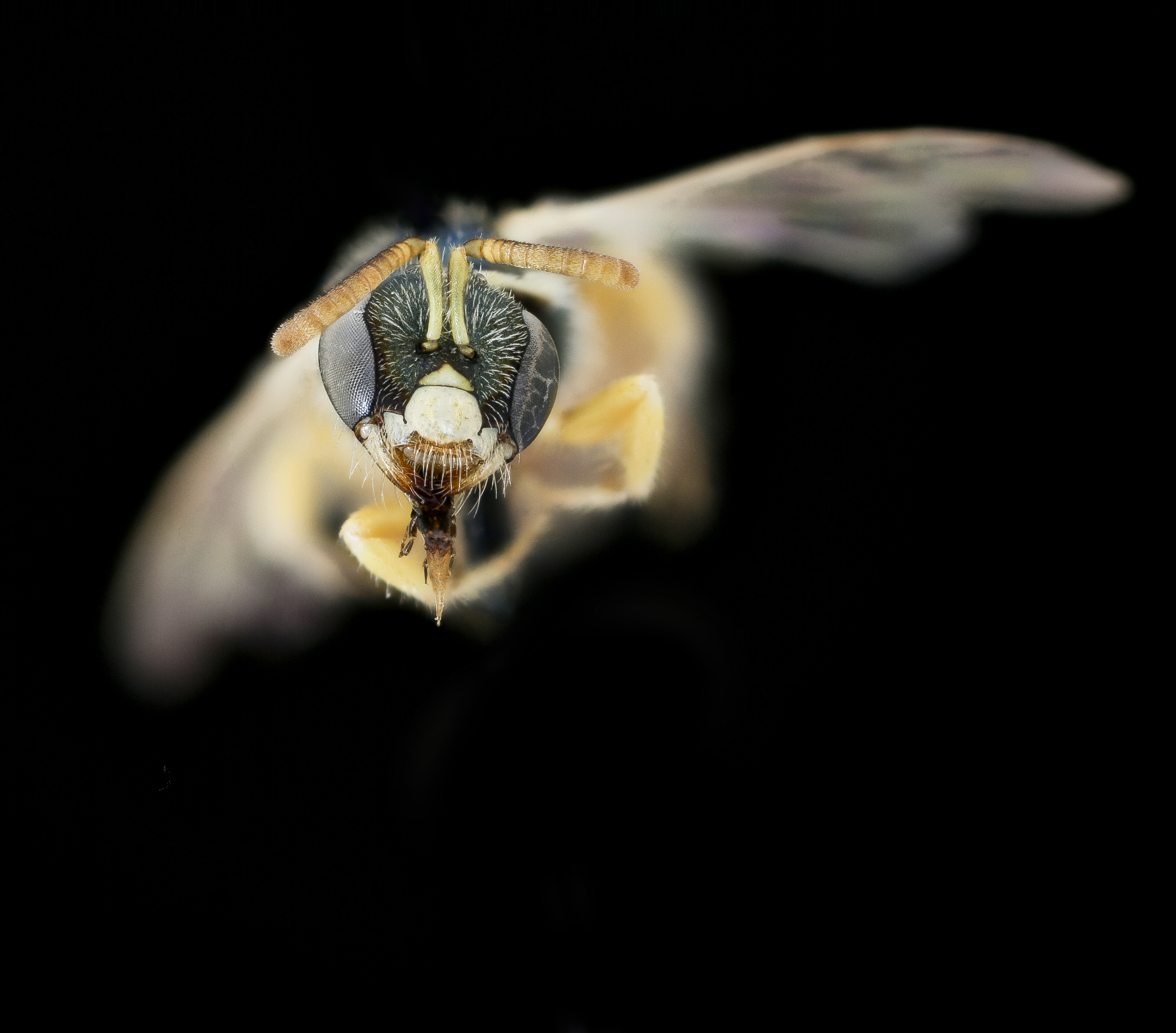
Female front view

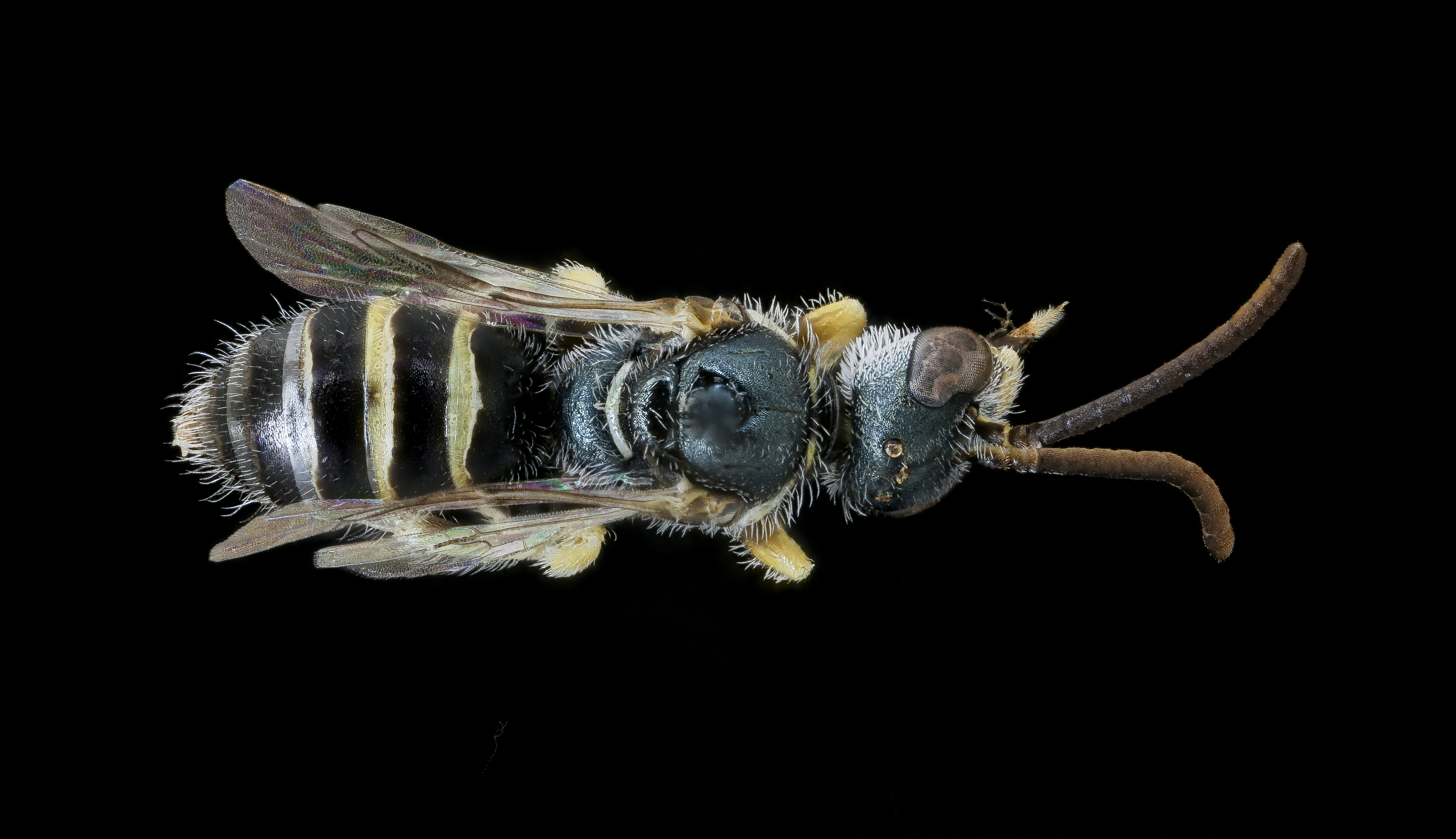
Male top view

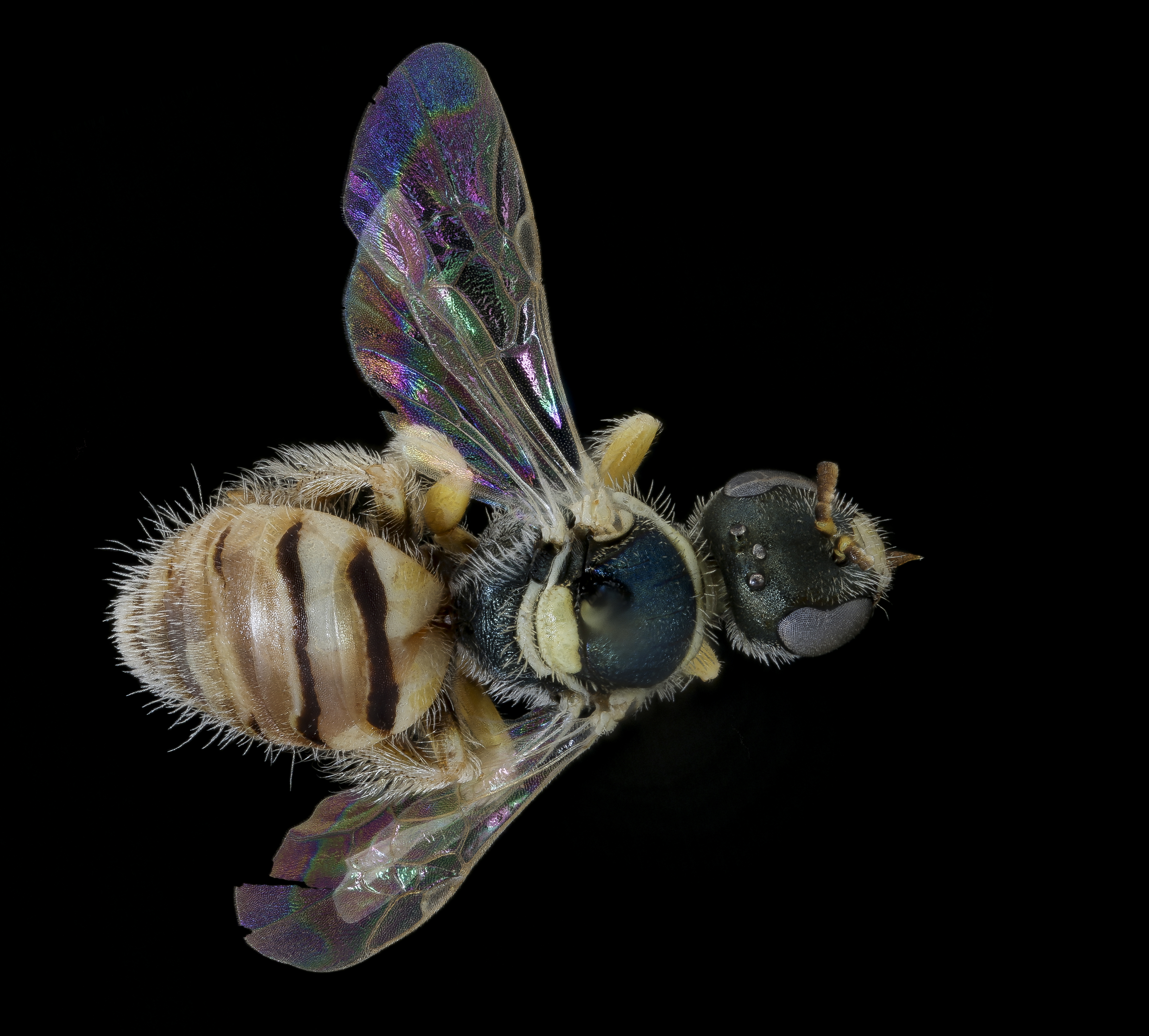
Female top view
