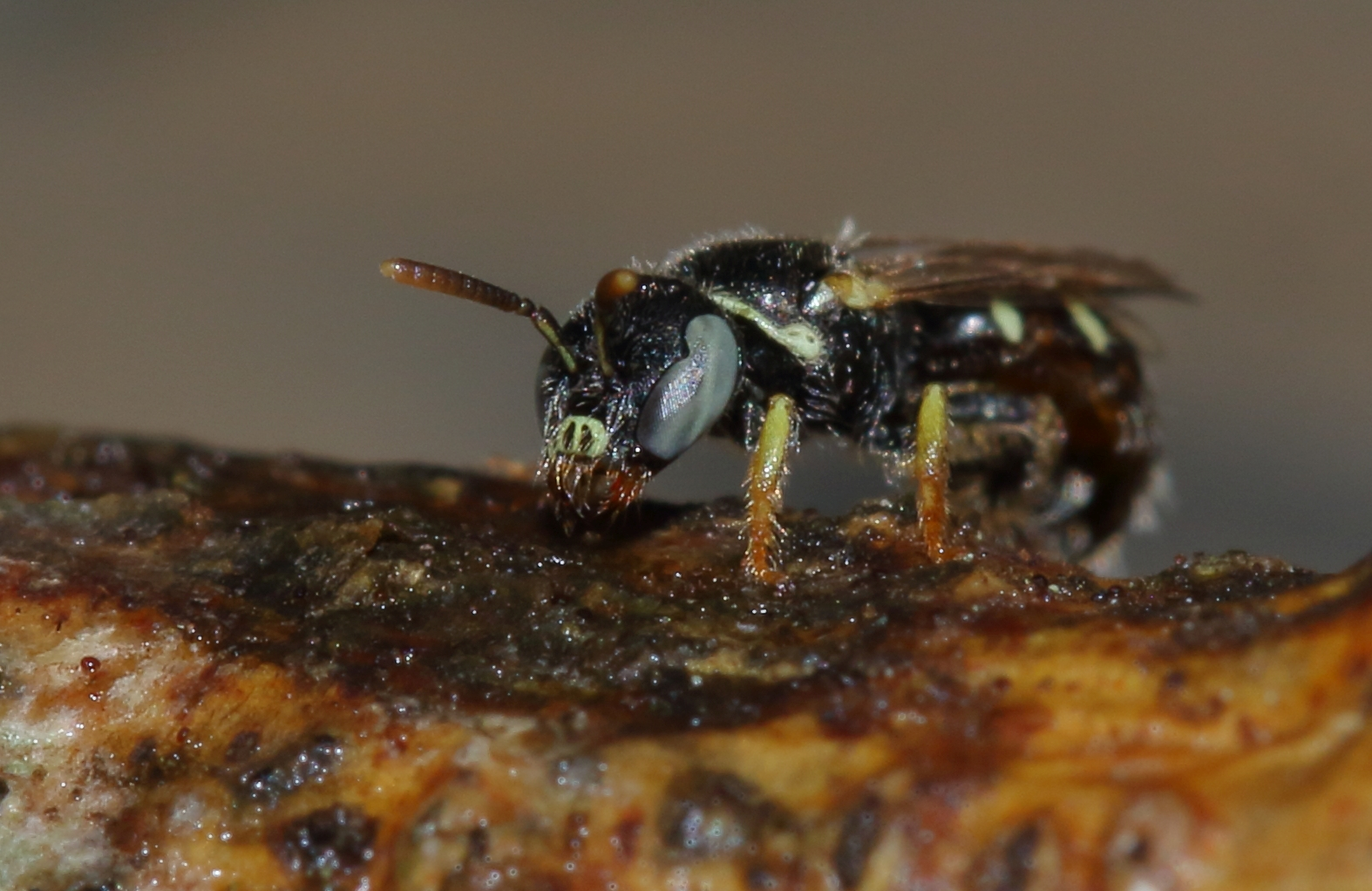
- Female Cellariella somalica

Scientific classification
- Kingdom: Animalia
- Phylum: Arthropoda
- Class: Insecta
- Order: Hymenoptera
- Family: Halictidae
- Subfamily: Nomioidinae
- Genus: Cellariella; Strand, 1926

= Cellariella =

Genus of insects

Cellariella is a genus of bees belonging to the family Halictidae. It has an Afrotropical distribution.

Species:

- Cellariella fulviventris
- Cellariella inexpectata
- Cellariella kalaharica
- Cellariella schwarzi
- Cellariella somalica
