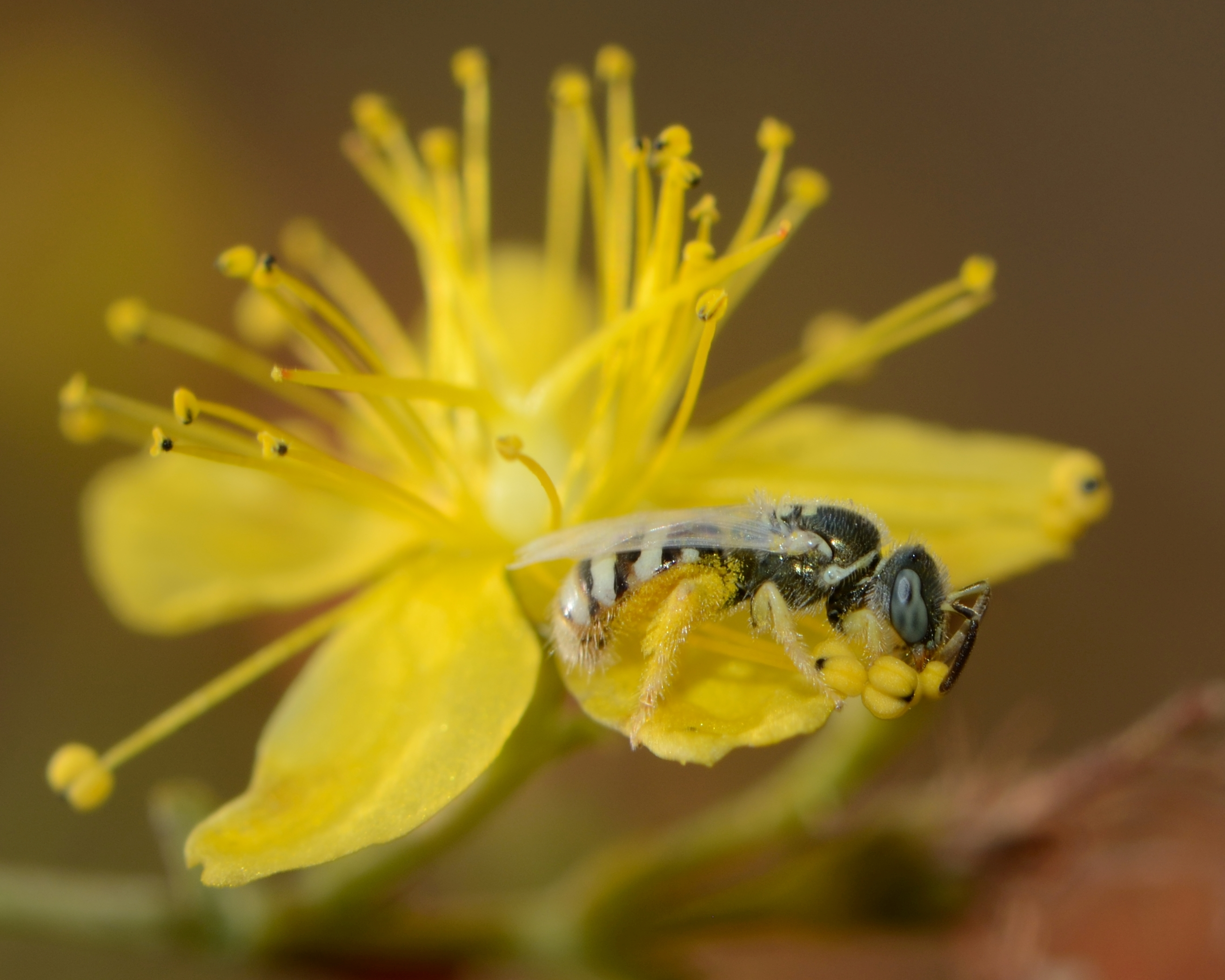
- Ceylalictus variegatus

Scientific classification
- Domain: Eukaryota
- Kingdom: Animalia
- Phylum: Arthropoda
- Class: Insecta
- Order: Hymenoptera
- Family: Halictidae
- Subfamily: Nomioidinae

= Nomioidinae =

Subfamily of bees

Nomioidinae is a subfamily of sweat bees in the family Halictidae that includes three genera and more than 80 species. They are small (most are less than 5 mm long) and many have metallic blue or green colours and/or prominent pale markings on their bodies. Most species are found in arid and semi-arid regions of Africa, Central Asia, and Southern Asia; one species (Ceylalictus perditellus) is found in Australia.

Each species collects pollen from a range of unrelated plants (polylectic). They typically nest in the ground, favoring sandy or rocky soils, and often form small to large nesting aggregations. Nomioidines are probably solitary or subsocial rather than eusocial. In Europe, they are generally univoltine with flight seasons in mid-summer, whereas in Africa and Central Asia they may produce two or more generations per year (bi- or polyvoltine).

The subfamily includes three genera:

- Cellariella, which is endemic to the Afrotropics;
- Ceylalictus, in Africa, Europe, Asia, and Australia; and
- Nomioides, in Africa, Europe, and Asia.
