= Nomioides pulverosus =

Scientific classification
- Domain: Eukaryota
- Kingdom: Animalia
- Phylum: Arthropoda
- Class: Insecta
- Order: Hymenoptera
- Family: Halictidae
- Genus: Nomioides
- Species: N. pulverosus

Binomial name
- Nomioides pulverosus Handlirsch, 1888

Species of bee

Nomioides pulverosus is a species of sweat bee in the family Halictidae. Its distribution includes South Kazakhstan, Turkmeninistan, Uzbekistan, Tajikistan, and Mongolia.
