= List of Lasioglossum species =

This is a list of species in the genus Lasioglossum.

== Lasioglossum species ==
=== A ===
- Lasioglossum abanci (Crawford, 1932)
- Lasioglossum aberrans (Crawford, 1903)
- Lasioglossum abietum (Michener, 1936)
- Lasioglossum ablenum (Blüthgen, 1934)
- Lasioglossum abrophilum Walker, 1995
- Lasioglossum absimile (Sandhouse, 1924)
- Lasioglossum absurdiceps (Timberlake, 1962)
- Lasioglossum abundum (Sandhouse, 1924)
- Lasioglossum aburiellum (Cockerell, 1946)
- Lasioglossum aburiense (Cockerell, 1945)
- Lasioglossum acaciae (Cockerell, 1939)
- Lasioglossum academicum (Sandhouse, 1924)
- Lasioglossum acanthostomum (Cockerell, 1942)
- Lasioglossum acanthum Ebmer, 1983
- Lasioglossum acarophilum McGinley, 1986
- Lasioglossum accentum (Sandhouse, 1924)
- Lasioglossum acephaloides (Blüthgen, 1931)
- Lasioglossum acephalum (Blüthgen, 1923)
- Lasioglossum acherontion Ebmer, 1978
- Lasioglossum achilleae (Mitchell, 1960)
- Lasioglossum achrostum (Michener, 1979)
- Lasioglossum actinosum (Sandhouse, 1924)
- Lasioglossum actuarium (Sandhouse, 1924)
- Lasioglossum acuiferum (Cockerell, 1935)
- Lasioglossum acuminatum McGinley, 1986
- Lasioglossum adabaschum (Blüthgen, 1931)
- Lasioglossum adaliae (Blüthgen, 1923)
- Lasioglossum adelaidae (Cockerell, 1905)
- Lasioglossum adiazetum (Walker, 1997)
- Lasioglossum admirandum (Sandhouse, 1924)
- Lasioglossum adonidiae (Cockerell, 1919)
- Lasioglossum adriani Genaro, 2001
- Lasioglossum adustum Walker, 1995
- Lasioglossum advertum (Mitchell, 1960)
- Lasioglossum aegyptiellum (Strand, 1909)
- Lasioglossum aeneiventre (Friese, 1917)
- Lasioglossum aeneum (Friese, 1917)
- Lasioglossum aequatum (Vachal, 1904)
- Lasioglossum aeratum (Kirby, 1802)
- Lasioglossum aethiopicum (Cameron, 1905)
- Lasioglossum aethiops (Blüthgen, 1935)
- Lasioglossum affine (Smith, 1853)
- Lasioglossum agelastum Fan & Ebmer, 1992
- Lasioglossum aglyphum (Pérez, 1895)
- Lasioglossum akroundicum (Blüthgen, 1937)
- Lasioglossum alacarinatum Walker, 1995
- Lasioglossum alachuense (Mitchell, 1960)
- Lasioglossum alaicum Pesenko, 1986
- Lasioglossum alanum (Blüthgen, 1929)
- Lasioglossum albescens (Smith, 1853)
- Lasioglossum albipenne (Robertson, 1890)
- Lasioglossum albipes (Fabricius, 1781)
- Lasioglossum albitarsatum (Ashmead, 1896)
- Lasioglossum albitarse (Cresson, 1872)
- Lasioglossum albitarsoides (Blüthgen, 1931)
- Lasioglossum albobarbatum (Cockerell, 1937)
- Lasioglossum albocinctum (Lucas, 1849)
- Lasioglossum albohirtum (Crawford, 1907)
- Lasioglossum albopilosum Walker, 1995
- Lasioglossum albostictum (Cockerell, 1946)
- Lasioglossum albovirens (Pérez, 1895)
- Lasioglossum albuquerquense (Michener, 1937)
- Lasioglossum alectore (Warncke, 1984)
- Lasioglossum alenicum (Strand, 1912)
- Lasioglossum alexanderi (McGinley, 1999)
- Lasioglossum alexandrinum Ebmer, 1995
- Lasioglossum algirum (Blüthgen, 1923)
- Lasioglossum alievi Pesenko, 1986
- Lasioglossum alinense (Cockerell, 1924)
- Lasioglossum aliud (Sandhouse, 1924)
- Lasioglossum allodalum Ebmer & Sakagami, 1985
- Lasioglossum allonotum (Cockerell, 1936)
- Lasioglossum alluaudi (Vachal, 1903)
- Lasioglossum alphenum (Cameron, 1897)
- Lasioglossum alpigenum (Dalla Torre, 1877)
- Lasioglossum alpinum Walker, 1995
- Lasioglossum alternatum (Mitchell, 1960)
- Lasioglossum altichum (Smith, 1853)
- Lasioglossum altissimum (Pauly, 1986)
- Lasioglossum amamiense Ebmer & Sakagami, 1994
- Lasioglossum amboquestrum Walker, 1995
- Lasioglossum ameliae (Cockerell, 1937)
- Lasioglossum ameshoferi Landaverde-González, 2023
- Lasioglossum amicum (Cockerell, 1897)
- Lasioglossum amitinum (Vachal, 1895)
- Lasioglossum amnestum Moure & Hurd, 1987
- Lasioglossum amplexum Walker, 1995
- Lasioglossum amurense (Vachal, 1902)
- Lasioglossum andrewsi (W. F. Kirby, 1900)
- Lasioglossum anellum (Vachal, 1905)
- Lasioglossum anforticornum Walker, 1995
- Lasioglossum angaricum (Cockerell, 1937)
- Lasioglossum angelicum Gardener & Gibbs 2023
- Lasioglossum anguliceps (Morawitz, 1893)
- Lasioglossum anguligulare (Blüthgen, 1929)
- Lasioglossum angusticaudus (Cockerell, 1939)
- Lasioglossum angusticeps (Perkins, 1895)
- Lasioglossum angustipes Ebmer, 1972
- Lasioglossum angustissimum (Cockerell, 1946)
- Lasioglossum angustius (Cockerell, 1897)
- Lasioglossum angustulum (Cockerell, 1937)
- Lasioglossum anhybodinum (Cockerell, 1930)
- Lasioglossum anhypops McGinley, 1986
- Lasioglossum ankaratrensis (Benoist, 1962)
- Lasioglossum annexum (Cockerell, 1922)
- Lasioglossum annulipes (Morawitz, 1876)
- Lasioglossum anomalipenne (Cockerell, 1943)
- Lasioglossum anomalum (Robertson, 1892)
- Lasioglossum anthrax Ebmer, 1995
- Lasioglossum antiochense (McGinley, 2003)
- Lasioglossum apertum (Sandhouse, 1924)
- Lasioglossum apocyni (Mitchell, 1960)
- Lasioglossum apopkense (Robertson, 1892)
- Lasioglossum apostoli Ebmer, 1970
- Lasioglossum appositum (Rayment, 1939)
- Lasioglossum apricarium (Warncke, 1982)
- Lasioglossum aprilinum (Morawitz, 1876)
- Lasioglossum apristum (Vachal, 1903)
- Lasioglossum aquilae (Cockerell, 1898)
- Lasioglossum aquilonium Walker, 1995
- Lasioglossum arabs (Pérez, 1907)
- Lasioglossum aratum (Vachal, 1904)
- Lasioglossum araxanum (Blüthgen, 1923)
- Lasioglossum arcanum (Sandhouse, 1924)
- Lasioglossum arciferum (Cockerell, 1914)
- Lasioglossum arctifrons (Saunders, 1903)
- Lasioglossum arctoum (Vachal, 1904)
- Lasioglossum arctous (Vachal, 1904)
- Lasioglossum arenicola (Friese, 1916)
- Lasioglossum areolatum (Friese, 1909)
- Lasioglossum argaeum (Blüthgen, 1931)
- Lasioglossum argemonis (Cockerell, 1897)
- Lasioglossum argopilatum Walker, 1995
- Lasioglossum argutum McGinley, 1986
- Lasioglossum ariadne Ebmer, 1981
- Lasioglossum aricense (Schrottky, 1910)
- Lasioglossum arizonense (Crawford, 1907)
- Lasioglossum articulare (Pérez, 1895)
- Lasioglossum aruwimiense (Strand, 1911)
- Lasioglossum asaphes McGinley, 1986
- Lasioglossum asellum (Pérez, 1895)
- Lasioglossum ashabadiense (Blüthgen, 1923)
- Lasioglossum aspasia (Smith, 1879)
- Lasioglossum asperithorax (Cockerell, 1910)
- Lasioglossum aspilurum (Cockerell, 1925)
- Lasioglossum aspratulum Walker, 1995
- Lasioglossum asteria Ebmer, 1978
- Lasioglossum asteris (Mitchell, 1960)
- Lasioglossum astutum (Sandhouse, 1924)
- Lasioglossum atasum (Blüthgen, 1928)
- Lasioglossum athabascense (Sandhouse, 1933)
- Lasioglossum athrix Walker, 1995
- Lasioglossum atlanticum (Mitchell, 1960)
- Lasioglossum atopophlebum (Cockerell, 1937)
- Lasioglossum atopterum (Cockerell, 1937)
- Lasioglossum atrazureum (Moure & Hurd, 1987)
- Lasioglossum atricrum (Vachal, 1903)
- Lasioglossum atripygum (Kirby, 1890)
- Lasioglossum atriventre (Crawford, 1906)
- Lasioglossum atroglaucum (Strand, 1913)
- Lasioglossum atronitens (Cockerell, 1914)
- Lasioglossum atrorufescens (Cockerell, 1914)
- Lasioglossum atrum (Walker, 1986)
- Lasioglossum atschinense (Blüthgen, 1931)
- Lasioglossum atwoodi Gibbs, 2010
- Lasioglossum audasi (Cockerell, 1945)
- Lasioglossum aulacophorum (Strand, 1913)
- Lasioglossum aurantiacum (Cockerell, 1916)
- Lasioglossum auratum (Ashmead, 1900)
- Lasioglossum aureimontanum Ebmer, 1970
- Lasioglossum aureolum (Pérez, 1903)
- Lasioglossum aureopilatum Walker, 1995
- Lasioglossum aureotarse (Friese, 1921)
- Lasioglossum aureoviride Landaverde-González & Husemann, 2023
- Lasioglossum aurigrum (Krombein, 1950)
- Lasioglossum aurora (Smith, 1879)
- Lasioglossum australe (Vachal, 1903)
- Lasioglossum autranellum (Vachal, 1904)
- Lasioglossum avalonense (Cockerell, 1938)

=== B ===
- Lasioglossum babakanense (Friese, 1914)
- Lasioglossum baigakumense (Blüthgen, 1923)
- Lasioglossum bajaense McGinley, 1986
- Lasioglossum bakeri Pauly, 2001
- Lasioglossum balboae (Cockerell, 1928)
- Lasioglossum balearicus Pérez, 1903
- Lasioglossum baleicum (Cockerell, 1937)
- Lasioglossum banahaone (Cockerell, 1914)
- Lasioglossum barbatum (Vachal, 1903)
- Lasioglossum barbertonicum (Cockerell, 1946)
- Lasioglossum bardum (Cresson, 1872)
- Lasioglossum barretti (Cockerell, 1929)
- Lasioglossum baruense (Friese, 1918)
- Lasioglossum basilanum (Blüthgen, 1928)
- Lasioglossum basilautum (Cockerell, 1910)
- Lasioglossum basilicum (Sandhouse, 1924)
- Lasioglossum bassanum (Warncke, 1982)
- Lasioglossum bataviae (Blüthgen, 1926)
- Lasioglossum baudini (Cockerell, 1915)
- Lasioglossum bavaricum (Blüthgen, 1930)
- Lasioglossum behri (Cockerell, 1910)
- Lasioglossum beirense (Cockerell, 1937)
- Lasioglossum belliatum Pesenko, 1986
- Lasioglossum bellulum (Vachal, 1910)
- Lasioglossum benignum Pesenko, 1986
- Lasioglossum bernardinense (Michener, 1936)
- Lasioglossum beskei (Vachal, 1904)
- Lasioglossum betomarium (Blüthgen, 1925)
- Lasioglossum bhutanicum Ebmer, 1998
- Lasioglossum bianone (Cockerell, 1945)
- Lasioglossum bibrochum Walker, 1995
- Lasioglossum bicallosum (Morawitz, 1874)
- Lasioglossum biceps Walker, 1995
- Lasioglossum biciliatum (Friese, 1917)
- Lasioglossum bicingulatum (Smith, 1853)
- Lasioglossum bicolor Walker, 1995
- Lasioglossum bidentatulum Walker, 1999
- Lasioglossum bidentatum (Cameron, 1898)
- Lasioglossum bimaculatum (Dours, 1872)
- Lasioglossum birkmanni (Crawford, 1906)
- Lasioglossum bischoffi (Blüthgen, 1931)
- Lasioglossum biseptum (Vachal, 1904)
- Lasioglossum bivarum (Vachal, 1904)
- Lasioglossum blackburni (Cockerell, 1910)
- Lasioglossum blakistoni Sakagami & Munakata, 1990
- Lasioglossum blandulum (Cockerell, 1929)
- Lasioglossum blighi (Cockerell, 1915)
- Lasioglossum bluethgeni Ebmer, 1971
- Lasioglossum boreale Svensson, Ebmer & Sakagami, 1977
- Lasioglossum botanicorum (Cockerell, 1943)
- Lasioglossum bouyssoui (Vachal, 1903)
- Lasioglossum bowkeri (Cockerell, 1920)
- Lasioglossum brachycephalum (Cockerell, 1925)
- Lasioglossum brachyplectum (Moure, 1956)
- Lasioglossum bradleyi (Mitchell, 1960)
- Lasioglossum brassicae (Mitchell, 1960)
- Lasioglossum brazieri (Cockerell, 1916)
- Lasioglossum bredoi (Cockerell, 1939)
- Lasioglossum breedi Michener, 1979
- Lasioglossum bremerense (Rayment, 1931)
- Lasioglossum brevibasis (Cockerell, 1938)
- Lasioglossum brevicorne (Schenck, 1870)
- Lasioglossum brevicornutum (Walker, 1986)
- Lasioglossum breviventre (Schenck, 1853)
- Lasioglossum brevizona (Benoist, 1962)
- Lasioglossum bribiense (Cockerell, 1916)
- Lasioglossum bribiensiforme (Cockerell, 1930)
- Lasioglossum brisbanense (Cockerell, 1918)
- Lasioglossum briseis Ebmer, 2005
- Lasioglossum brochum Walker, 1995
- Lasioglossum bruesi (Cockerell, 1912)
- Lasioglossum bruneri (Crawford, 1902)
- Lasioglossum bruneriellum (Cockerell, 1918)
- Lasioglossum brunneiventre (Crawford, 1907)
- Lasioglossum brunnesetum Walker, 1995
- Lasioglossum bryotrichum (Cockerell, 1912)
- Lasioglossum bubrachium Walker, 1995
- Lasioglossum buccale (Pérez, 1903)
- Lasioglossum buccinum (Vachal, 1895)
- Lasioglossum bucculum Walker, 1995
- Lasioglossum bullatum Walker, 1995
- Lasioglossum burmanicum (Blüthgen, 1926)
- Lasioglossum burmense (Blüthgen, 1926)
- Lasioglossum burnupi (Cockerell, 1920)
- Lasioglossum buruense (Blüthgen, 1926)
- Lasioglossum busckiellum (Cockerell, 1915)
- Lasioglossum butleri (Rayment, 1935)

=== C ===
- Lasioglossum cabrilli (Cockerell, 1937)
- Lasioglossum caducum (Sandhouse, 1924)
- Lasioglossum caeruleiceps (Friese, 1914)
- Lasioglossum caesium Walker, 1995
- Lasioglossum calcarium Ebmer, 2002
- Lasioglossum calceatum (Scopoli, 1763)
- Lasioglossum californiae (Ellis, 1924)
- Lasioglossum caliginosum Murao, Ebmer & Tadauchi, 2006
- Lasioglossum callaspis (Cockerell, 1915)
- Lasioglossum callidum (Sandhouse, 1924)
- Lasioglossum callizonium (Pérez, 1896)
- Lasioglossum callomelittinum (Cockerell, 1910)
- Lasioglossum callophrys Ebmer, 2002
- Lasioglossum callorhinum (Cockerell, 1937)
- Lasioglossum calophyllae (Rayment, 1935)
- Lasioglossum caloundrense (Cockerell, 1914)
- Lasioglossum calviniellum (Cockerell, 1940)
- Lasioglossum cambagei (Cockerell, 1910)
- Lasioglossum cameronellum (Cockerell, 1911)
- Lasioglossum camphorellum (Cockerell, 1940)
- Lasioglossum candicicinctum (Cockerell, 1945)
- Lasioglossum candidiferum (Cockerell, 1946)
- Lasioglossum capicola (Cameron, 1905)
- Lasioglossum capitale (Pérez, 1903)
- Lasioglossum capnopum (Vachal, 1903)
- Lasioglossum carbonarium (Smith, 1853)
- Lasioglossum cardaleae Walker, 1995
- Lasioglossum cardiurum (Cockerell, 1945)
- Lasioglossum carinatum (Cameron, 1903)
- Lasioglossum carinifrons (Cameron, 1904)
- Lasioglossum cariocum (Schrottky, 1910)
- Lasioglossum carneiventre (Dours, 1872)
- Lasioglossum carpobrotum Walker, 1995
- Lasioglossum caspicum (Morawitz, 1874)
- Lasioglossum cassiaefloris (Cockerell, 1914)
- Lasioglossum cassioides Ebmer, 2002
- Lasioglossum castilianum (Blüthgen, 1931)
- Lasioglossum castor Walker, 1995
- Lasioglossum catileps (Blüthgen, 1926)
- Lasioglossum cattellae (Ellis, 1913)
- Lasioglossum cavernifrons (Blüthgen, 1926)
- Lasioglossum cavillosum (Vachal, 1895)
- Lasioglossum ceanothi (Mitchell, 1960)
- Lasioglossum centesimum (Blüthgen, 1924)
- Lasioglossum cephalinotum (Cockerell, 1946)
- Lasioglossum cephalochilum Michener, 1965
- Lasioglossum cephalotes (Dalla Torre, 1896)
- Lasioglossum cerambyx Ebmer, 1980
- Lasioglossum cercothrix McGinley, 1986
- Lasioglossum cervicale (Cockerell, 1915)
- Lasioglossum cessulum (Cockerell, 1940)
- Lasioglossum cetti (Warncke, 1982)
- Lasioglossum chalcochiton (Vachal, 1911)
- Lasioglossum chalcodes (Brullé, 1840)
- Lasioglossum chalybaeum (Friese, 1917)
- Lasioglossum channelense McGinley, 1986
- Lasioglossum chanyomae (Blüthgen, 1931)
- Lasioglossum chapmani (Cockerell, 1910)
- Lasioglossum charisterion Ebmer, 2002
- Lasioglossum chinense (Dalla Torre, 1896)
- Lasioglossum chiromense (Cockerell, 1945)
- Lasioglossum chiwense (Blüthgen, 1931)
- Lasioglossum chloridicum Ebmer, 1974
- Lasioglossum chloronotulum (Cockerell, 1940)
- Lasioglossum chloronotum (Cockerell, 1937)
- Lasioglossum chlorophaenum Ebmer, 2008
- Lasioglossum chloropus (Morawitz, 1894)
- Lasioglossum chryseis (Smith, 1879)
- Lasioglossum chrysonotum (Ellis, 1914)
- Lasioglossum ciliatum Ebmer, 1998
- Lasioglossum cilicium Ebmer, 1972
- Lasioglossum cinclum (Warncke, 1984)
- Lasioglossum cinctipes (Provancher, 1888)
- Lasioglossum cinctulum (Cockerell, 1945)
- Lasioglossum cinereum (Friese, 1917)
- Lasioglossum cingulatum (Morawitz, 1876)
- Lasioglossum circe Ebmer, 1982
- Lasioglossum circinatum (Vachal, 1904)
- Lasioglossum circularum Fan & Ebmer, 1992
- Lasioglossum cire (Cameron, 1897)
- Lasioglossum cirriferum (Cockerell, 1910)
- Lasioglossum ciscapum (Blüthgen, 1931)
- Lasioglossum citerius (Vachal, 1904)
- Lasioglossum claricinctum (Cockerell, 1937)
- Lasioglossum clarigaster (Cockerell, 1918)
- Lasioglossum claripenne (Cockerell, 1946)
- Lasioglossum clarissimum (Ellis, 1914)
- Lasioglossum clarum (Nurse, 1902)
- Lasioglossum claudia Ebmer, 2002
- Lasioglossum clavigerellum (Cockerell, 1945)
- Lasioglossum clavipes (Dours, 1872)
- Lasioglossum clelandi (Cockerell, 1910)
- Lasioglossum clematisellum (Cockerell, 1904)
- Lasioglossum clivicola (Cockerell, 1937)
- Lasioglossum clypeare (Schenck, 1853)
- Lasioglossum clypeatum Walker, 1995
- Lasioglossum clypeiferellum (Strand, 1909)
- Lasioglossum clypeinitens Ebmer, 2002
- Lasioglossum coactum (Cresson, 1872)
- Lasioglossum cockerellellus (Blüthgen, 1931)
- Lasioglossum cocos (Pauly & Munzinger, 2003)
- Lasioglossum coeruleodorsatum (Strand, 1911)
- Lasioglossum coeruleum (Robertson, 1893)
- Lasioglossum cognatum (Smith, 1853)
- Lasioglossum colatum (Vachal, 1904)
- Lasioglossum collegum (Cameron, 1905)
- Lasioglossum collopiense (Pérez, 1903)
- Lasioglossum colonicum (Rayment, 1953)
- Lasioglossum coloratipes (Cockerell, 1946)
- Lasioglossum comagenense (Knerer & Atwood, 1964)
- Lasioglossum comorense Pauly, 2001
- Lasioglossum compressum (Blüthgen, 1926)
- Lasioglossum comulum Michener, 1951
- Lasioglossum concessum (Cockerell, 1946)
- Lasioglossum conciliatum (Cockerell, 1946)
- Lasioglossum congoense (Friese, 1921)
- Lasioglossum connexum (Cresson, 1872)
- Lasioglossum conspicuum (Smith, 1879)
- Lasioglossum constrictulum (Cockerell, 1945)
- Lasioglossum contaminatum (Cockerell, 1910)
- Lasioglossum contracticaudus (Cockerell, 1937)
- Lasioglossum convexiusculum (Schenck, 1853)
- Lasioglossum convexum (Smith, 1879)
- Lasioglossum cooleyi (Crawford, 1906)
- Lasioglossum copleyense Walker, 1995
- Lasioglossum cordleyi (Crawford, 1906)
- Lasioglossum coreopsis (Robertson, 1902)
- Lasioglossum coriaceum (Smith, 1853)
- Lasioglossum corsicanum (Blüthgen, 1931)
- Lasioglossum corvinum (Morawitz, 1876)
- Lasioglossum costale (Vachal, 1904)
- Lasioglossum costaricense (Crawford, 1906)
- Lasioglossum costulatum (Kriechbaumer, 1873)
- Lasioglossum crassepunctatum (Blüthgen, 1923)
- Lasioglossum crassicaudus (Cockerell, 1946)
- Lasioglossum crassiceps (Ellis, 1914)
- Lasioglossum crassivene (Cockerell, 1939)
- Lasioglossum creberrimum (Smith, 1853)
- Lasioglossum creightoni (Cockerell, 1908)
- Lasioglossum crepusculum Ebmer, 2008
- Lasioglossum cressonii (Robertson, 1890)
- Lasioglossum creusum (Schrottky, 1910)
- Lasioglossum cribrum Ebmer, 2008
- Lasioglossum cristula (Pérez, 1896)
- Lasioglossum croceipes (Morawitz, 1876)
- Lasioglossum crocinum (Vachal, 1903)
- Lasioglossum crocoturum (Vachal, 1904)
- Lasioglossum ctenander (Michener, 1965)
- Lasioglossum cubitale (Vachal, 1904)
- Lasioglossum cucullatum (Warncke, 1984)
- Lasioglossum cuniculum (Vachal, 1895)
- Lasioglossum cupreicolle (Friese, 1917)
- Lasioglossum cupromicans (Pérez, 1903)
- Lasioglossum curtulum (Vachal, 1904)
- Lasioglossum cyaneodiscum (Cockerell, 1946)
- Lasioglossum cyaneonotum (Crawford, 1907)
- Lasioglossum cyanescens (Cockerell, 1919)
- Lasioglossum cyaneum (Ashmead, 1900)
- Lasioglossum cyanorugosum Engel, Hinojosa-Díaz & Yáñez-Ordóñez, 2007
- Lasioglossum cyanurum (Cockerell, 1936)
- Lasioglossum cyclurum (Cockerell, 1915)

=== D ===
- Lasioglossum daggetti (Cockerell, 1916)
- Lasioglossum daglariense (Warncke, 1984)
- Lasioglossum damascenum (Pérez, 1910)
- Lasioglossum dampieri (Cockerell, 1905)
- Lasioglossum danforthi (McGinley, 2003)
- Lasioglossum danicorum (Cockerell, 1909)
- Lasioglossum danuvium (Blüthgen, 1944)
- Lasioglossum daphne Ebmer, 1978
- Lasioglossum darwiniellum (Cockerell, 1932)
- Lasioglossum dasiphorae (Cockerell, 1901)
- Lasioglossum dasygaster (Vachal, 1895)
- Lasioglossum dathei Ebmer, 2008
- Lasioglossum davide (Cockerell, 1910)
- Lasioglossum debile (Morawitz, 1893)
- Lasioglossum debilinerve (Cockerell, 1911)
- Lasioglossum debilior (Pérez, 1910)
- Lasioglossum deceptor (Ellis, 1914)
- Lasioglossum deceptum (Smith, 1853)
- Lasioglossum declivis (Pauly, 1980)
- Lasioglossum decolor (Pérez, 1895)
- Lasioglossum delectatum (Mitchell, 1960)
- Lasioglossum deliense (Strand, 1910)
- Lasioglossum delobeli Pauly & Munzinger, 2003
- Lasioglossum demicapillum Walker, 1995
- Lasioglossum denislucum (Strand, 1909)
- Lasioglossum denselineatum (Cockerell, 1945)
- Lasioglossum denticeps Michener, 1954
- Lasioglossum denticolle (Morawitz, 1891)
- Lasioglossum dernaense (Blüthgen, 1925)
- Lasioglossum desertum (Smith, 1879)
- Lasioglossum diatretum (Vachal, 1904)
- Lasioglossum dichrous (Blüthgen, 1924)
- Lasioglossum didomenon Ebmer, 1980
- Lasioglossum diloloense (Cockerell, 1937)
- Lasioglossum diluculum Ebmer, 2008
- Lasioglossum diminutellum (Cockerell, 1937)
- Lasioglossum dimorphum (Rayment, 1954)
- Lasioglossum dinazade Ebmer, 2000
- Lasioglossum disabanci (Knerer & Atwood, 1966)
- Lasioglossum disclusum (Cockerell, 1914)
- Lasioglossum discretulum (Cockerell, 1940)
- Lasioglossum discum (Smith, 1853)
- Lasioglossum discursum (Cameron, 1897)
- Lasioglossum disparile (Cresson, 1872)
- Lasioglossum dispositellum (Cockerell, 1934)
- Lasioglossum dissimulator (Cockerell, 1914)
- Lasioglossum divergenoides (Mitchell, 1960)
- Lasioglossum divergens (Lovell, 1905)
- Lasioglossum diversopunctatum (Ellis, 1914)
- Lasioglossum diversum (Smith, 1879)
- Lasioglossum doddi (Cockerell, 1914)
- Lasioglossum dolichocephalum (Blüthgen, 1923)
- Lasioglossum dorchini (Pauly, 2020)
- Lasioglossum dolus Ebmer, 1974
- Lasioglossum dotatum (Cockerell, 1912)
- Lasioglossum drakensbergense (Cockerell, 1946)
- Lasioglossum dreisbachi (Mitchell, 1960)
- Lasioglossum dubitatum (Mitchell, 1960)
- Lasioglossum duckei (Alfken, 1909)
- Lasioglossum duplex (Dalla Torre, 1896)
- Lasioglossum duponti (Vachal, 1903)
- Lasioglossum durbanense (Cockerell, 1940)
- Lasioglossum dusmeti (Blüthgen, 1924)
- Lasioglossum dybowskii (Radoszkowski, 1876)
- Lasioglossum dynastes (Bingham, 1898)

=== E ===
- Lasioglossum ebeneum Walker, 1995
- Lasioglossum ebmerianum Sakagami & Tadauchi, 1995
- Lasioglossum ecanidum Pauly, 1980
- Lasioglossum edentulatum Walker, 1995
- Lasioglossum edessae Ebmer, 1974
- Lasioglossum eduardi (Blüthgen, 1931)
- Lasioglossum egregium (Vachal, 1904)
- Lasioglossum eickwortellum (Engel, 2001)
- Lasioglossum eickworti McGinley, 1986
- Lasioglossum eidmanni (Blüthgen, 1926)
- Lasioglossum elaiochromon Ebmer, 2002
- Lasioglossum elbanum (Blüthgen, 1934)
- Lasioglossum elegans (Lepeletier, 1841)
- Lasioglossum eleutherense (Engel, 2001)
- Lasioglossum ellipticeps (Blüthgen, 1923)
- Lasioglossum emirnense (Benoist, 1955)
- Lasioglossum engeli Genaro, 2001
- Lasioglossum enslini Ebmer, 1972
- Lasioglossum entebbianum (Cockerell, 1945)
- Lasioglossum eomontanum Ebmer, 2006
- Lasioglossum eophilium (Ellis, 1914)
- Lasioglossum eos Ebmer, 1978
- Lasioglossum epichlorum (Cockerell, 1937)
- Lasioglossum epicinctum (Strand, 1914)
- Lasioglossum epiense (Cockerell, 1916)
- Lasioglossum epiphron Ebmer, 1982
- Lasioglossum epipygiale (Blüthgen, 1924)
- Lasioglossum equestre (Morawitz, 1876)
- Lasioglossum equinum Ebmer, 1978
- Lasioglossum eremaean Walker, 1995
- Lasioglossum eremophilum Walker, 1995
- Lasioglossum eriphyle Ebmer, 1996
- Lasioglossum ernesti Pauly, 2001
- Lasioglossum erraticum (Blüthgen, 1931)
- Lasioglossum erythrurum (Cockerell, 1914)
- Lasioglossum eschaton Ebmer, 1995
- Lasioglossum etheridgei (Cockerell, 1916)
- Lasioglossum euboeense (Strand, 1909)
- Lasioglossum eurasicum Ebmer, 1972
- Lasioglossum eurhodopum (Cockerell, 1914)
- Lasioglossum europense (Benoist, 1950)
- Lasioglossum euryale Ebmer, 1982
- Lasioglossum eurycephalum Walker, 1995
- Lasioglossum eurydikae Ebmer, 1974
- Lasioglossum euxanthopus Pesenko, 1986
- Lasioglossum euxinicum Ebmer, 1972
- Lasioglossum evanidum (Vachal, 1903)
- Lasioglossum evestigatum (Sandhouse, 1924)
- Lasioglossum ewarti (Cockerell, 1910)
- Lasioglossum exactum (Cockerell, 1937)
- Lasioglossum excisum Ebmer, 1998
- Lasioglossum excultum (Cockerell, 1913)
- Lasioglossum exiguiforme (Ellis, 1914)
- Lasioglossum exiguum (Smith, 1879)
- Lasioglossum exiliceps (Vachal, 1903)
- Lasioglossum exlautum (Cockerell, 1905)
- Lasioglossum exleyae (Walker, 1986)
- Lasioglossum exoneuroides (Rayment, 1953)
- Lasioglossum exophthalmum (Walker, 1986)
- Lasioglossum expansifrons (Cockerell, 1914)
- Lasioglossum expulsum (Cockerell, 1916)
- Lasioglossum exterum (Cockerell, 1911)
- Lasioglossum extraordinarium (Kohl, 1908)
- Lasioglossum exulans Ebmer, 1978

=== F ===
- Lasioglossum fahringeri (Friese, 1921)
- Lasioglossum falcatum Walker, 1995
- Lasioglossum fallax (Morawitz, 1874)
- Lasioglossum familiare (Erichson, 1842)
- Lasioglossum fasciatum Walker, 1995
- Lasioglossum fasciger (Strand, 1909)
- Lasioglossum fattigi (Mitchell, 1960)
- Lasioglossum faustum Ebmer, 1978
- Lasioglossum feai (Vachal, 1895)
- Lasioglossum fedorense (Crawford, 1906)
- Lasioglossum fedtschenkoi (Blüthgen, 1938)
- Lasioglossum femorale (Saunders, 1908)
- Lasioglossum fernandezis Engel, 2000
- Lasioglossum ferrerii (Baker, 1906)
- Lasioglossum figueresi Wcislo, 1990
- Lasioglossum fijiense (Perkins & Cheesman, 1928)
- Lasioglossum filiferreum (Pauly, 1986)
- Lasioglossum filipes Ebmer, 1972
- Lasioglossum fimbriatellum (Vachal, 1895)
- Lasioglossum flammeum (Pauly, 1986)
- Lasioglossum flaveriae (Mitchell, 1960)
- Lasioglossum flavipes (Moure, 1950)
- Lasioglossum flavipes (Pauly, 1986)
- Lasioglossum flavohirtum Ebmer, 2002
- Lasioglossum flavolineatum (Cockerell, 1937)
- Lasioglossum flavopunctatum (Friese, 1924)
- Lasioglossum flavoscapus Ebmer, 2008
- Lasioglossum flindersi (Cockerell, 1905)
- Lasioglossum florale (Smith, 1853)
- Lasioglossum floridanum Robertson, 1892
- Lasioglossum forbesii (Robertson, 1890)
- Lasioglossum formosae (Strand, 1910)
- Lasioglossum forrestae (Walker, 1986)
- Lasioglossum forresti (Cockerell, 1906)
- Lasioglossum foveolatum (Robertson, 1902)
- Lasioglossum foxii (Robertson, 1895)
- Lasioglossum frankenia Walker, 1995
- Lasioglossum franki (Friese, 1924)
- Lasioglossum fratellum (Pérez, 1903)
- Lasioglossum fraternum (Smith, 1860)
- Lasioglossum frenchellum Michener, 1965
- Lasioglossum frenchi (Cockerell, 1904)
- Lasioglossum frigidum Sakagami & Ebmer, 1996
- Lasioglossum froggatti (Cockerell, 1905)
- Lasioglossum froggatti (Cockerell, 1911)
- Lasioglossum froggatti Walker, 1995
- Lasioglossum fruhstorferi (Blüthgen, 1926)
- Lasioglossum fulgens (Nurse, 1902)
- Lasioglossum fulgonitens Ebmer, 1982
- Lasioglossum fultoni (Cockerell, 1914)
- Lasioglossum fulvicorne (Kirby, 1802)
- Lasioglossum fulvitarse (Morawitz, 1876)
- Lasioglossum fulviventre (Friese, 1924)
- Lasioglossum fulvofasciae Michener, 1965
- Lasioglossum fulvopacum Ebmer, 1983
- Lasioglossum fumidicaudus (Cockerell, 1914)
- Lasioglossum funebre (Cameron, 1897)
- Lasioglossum fuscipenne (Smith, 1853)
- Lasioglossum fynbosense (Pauly, Timmermann & Kuhlmann, 2008)

=== G ===
- Lasioglossum gastrophilinum (Cockerell, 1939)
- Lasioglossum gattaca Danforth & Wcislo, 1999
- Lasioglossum gemmatum (Smith, 1853)
- Lasioglossum gendettense (Cockerell, 1937)
- Lasioglossum gentianae (Rayment, 1951)
- Lasioglossum genuinum (Sandhouse, 1924)
- Lasioglossum georgicum (Cockerell, 1937)
- Lasioglossum getasanum (Blüthgen, 1926)
- Lasioglossum geteinum (Cockerell, 1945)
- Lasioglossum gibber (Vachal, 1892)
- Lasioglossum gibbosum (Friese, 1924)
- Lasioglossum giffardi (Michener, 1937)
- Lasioglossum giffardiellum (Cockerell, 1945)
- Lasioglossum gilanum (Blüthgen, 1931)
- Lasioglossum gilesi (Cockerell, 1905)
- Lasioglossum glabriusculum (Morawitz, 1872)
- Lasioglossum glabriventre (Crawford, 1907)
- Lasioglossum glaciegenitum Ebmer, 1972
- Lasioglossum glandon Ebmer, 2002
- Lasioglossum globosum (Smith, 1853)
- Lasioglossum godmanae Michener, 1969
- Lasioglossum goilalaense (Pauly, 1986)
- Lasioglossum goluratum (Blüthgen, 1926)
- Lasioglossum goniurum (Cockerell, 1937)
- Lasioglossum gorgasi (Cockerell, 1928)
- Lasioglossum gorge Ebmer, 1982
- Lasioglossum gorkiense (Blüthgen, 1931)
- Lasioglossum gorokaense (Pauly, 1986)
- Lasioglossum gossypiellum (Cockerell, 1945)
- Lasioglossum gotham Gibbs, 2011
- Lasioglossum graaffi (Cockerell, 1941)
- Lasioglossum grande (Meyer, 1920)
- Lasioglossum grandiceps (Friese, 1925)
- Lasioglossum granosum (Vachal, 1904)
- Lasioglossum greavesi (Rayment, 1930)
- Lasioglossum gressitti (Pauly, 1986)
- Lasioglossum grinnelli (Cockerell, 1916)
- Lasioglossum griseipenne (Cockerell, 1929)
- Lasioglossum grisellinum (Blüthgen, 1931)
- Lasioglossum griseocinctum (Cockerell, 1945)
- Lasioglossum griseolum (Morawitz, 1872)
- Lasioglossum grossopedalum (Walker, 1986)
- Lasioglossum grumiculum Walker, 1995
- Lasioglossum guaruvae (Moure, 1987)
- Lasioglossum guianense (Cockerell, 1936)
- Lasioglossum guineabium (Strand, 1912)
- Lasioglossum gulare (Vachal, 1904)
- Lasioglossum gunbowerense (Rayment, 1939)
- Lasioglossum gundlachii (Baker, 1906)
- Lasioglossum gunungense (Blüthgen, 1931)
- Lasioglossum gussakovskii (Blüthgen, 1929)
- Lasioglossum gynochilum Michener, 1965

=== H ===
- Lasioglossum hadrandrum (Michener, 1979)
- Lasioglossum halictoides (Smith, 1858)
- Lasioglossum halictoides (Fox, 1893)
- Lasioglossum halophitum (Graenicher, 1927)
- Lasioglossum hamatum Walker, 1995
- Lasioglossum hammondi (Cockerell, 1938)
- Lasioglossum hancocki (Cockerell, 1945)
- Lasioglossum hapsidum Walker, 1995
- Lasioglossum harmandi (Vachal, 1903)
- Lasioglossum harputicum Ebmer, 1972
- Lasioglossum hartii (Robertson, 1892)
- Lasioglossum hartmanni Danforth & Wcislo, 1999
- Lasioglossum havanense (Baker, 1906)
- Lasioglossum hazarani (Warncke, 1982)
- Lasioglossum hecate Ebmer, 1986
- Lasioglossum helichrysi (Cockerell, 1914)
- Lasioglossum helios Ebmer, 1985
- Lasioglossum hemichalceum (Cockerell, 1923)
- Lasioglossum hemicyaneum (Benoist, 1944)
- Lasioglossum hemileucospilum (Cockerell, 1937)
- Lasioglossum hemimelas (Cockerell, 1901)
- Lasioglossum herbstiellum (Friese, 1917)
- Lasioglossum heterognathum (Mitchell, 1960)
- Lasioglossum heterorhinum (Cockerell, 1930)
- Lasioglossum hethiticum Ebmer, 1970
- Lasioglossum hewetti (Cockerell, 1913)
- Lasioglossum hiemale (Cockerell, 1926)
- Lasioglossum highlandicum (Mitchell, 1960)
- Lasioglossum hilactum (Smith, 1853)
- Lasioglossum hilare Ebmer, 1972
- Lasioglossum hiltacum (Smith, 1853)
- Lasioglossum himalayense (Bingham, 1898)
- Lasioglossum hirashimae Ebmer & Sakagami, 1977
- Lasioglossum hirashimai (Michener, 1980)
- Lasioglossum hirsutifrons (Cockerell, 1946)
- Lasioglossum hirtiventre (Cockerell, 1922)
- Lasioglossum hirtulinum (Cockerell, 1939)
- Lasioglossum hispanicum (Blüthgen, 1931)
- Lasioglossum hoedillum (Vachal, 1903)
- Lasioglossum hofferi Pesenko, 1986
- Lasioglossum hoffmanni (Strand, 1915)
- Lasioglossum holochlorum (Cockerell, 1914)
- Lasioglossum holomelanurum (Cockerell, 1937)
- Lasioglossum holostictum (Cockerell, 1940)
- Lasioglossum houstoni (Walker, 1986)
- Lasioglossum hualitchu (Holmberg, 1886)
- Lasioglossum huanghe Ebmer, 2002
- Lasioglossum hudsoniellum (Cockerell, 1919)
- Lasioglossum humboldtense (Michener, 1936)
- Lasioglossum humei (Cockerell, 1905)
- Lasioglossum hummeli (Blüthgen, 1934)
- Lasioglossum hunteri (Cockerell, 1932)
- Lasioglossum huttoni (Cameron, 1900)
- Lasioglossum hyalinipenne (Morawitz, 1876)
- Lasioglossum hyalinum (Crawford, 1907)
- Lasioglossum hybodinum (Cockerell, 1912)
- Lasioglossum hydrocephalum (Blüthgen, 1926)
- Lasioglossum hypochlorinum (Cockerell, 1940)
- Lasioglossum hypochlorum (Ellis, 1914)
- Lasioglossum hypoleucum (Cockerell, 1937)
- Lasioglossum hypsiston Ebmer, 1980
- Lasioglossum hyrkanium Ebmer, 1978

=== I ===
- Lasioglossum ibadanicum (Cockerell, 1945)
- Lasioglossum ibericum Ebmer, 1975
- Lasioglossum ilicum (Blüthgen, 1924)
- Lasioglossum illinoense (Robertson, 1892)
- Lasioglossum imbecillum Ebmer, 1974
- Lasioglossum imbrex Gibbs, 2010
- Lasioglossum imitans (Cockerell, 1914)
- Lasioglossum imitator Michener, 1965
- Lasioglossum imitatum (Smith, 1853)
- Lasioglossum immaculatum Walker, 1995
- Lasioglossum immunitum (Vachal, 1895)
- Lasioglossum impavidum (Sandhouse, 1924)
- Lasioglossum impunctatum Walker, 1999
- Lasioglossum impurum (Cresson, 1872)
- Lasioglossum imuganense (Cockerell, 1919)
- Lasioglossum incompletum (Crawford, 1907)
- Lasioglossum inconditum (Cockerell, 1916)
- Lasioglossum indistinctum (Crawford, 1906)
- Lasioglossum infimum (Erichson, 1842)
- Lasioglossum inflatum Walker, 1995
- Lasioglossum ingogoense (Cockerell, 1940)
- Lasioglossum inoum (Cameron, 1904)
- Lasioglossum insculptum (Cockerell, 1918)
- Lasioglossum insigne (Meyer, 1920)
- Lasioglossum insolitum (Sandhouse, 1924)
- Lasioglossum instabilis (Cockerell, 1914)
- Lasioglossum insulsum (Sandhouse, 1924)
- Lasioglossum intermedium (Schenck, 1870)
- Lasioglossum interruptum (Panzer, 1798)
- Lasioglossum interstitinerve (Cameron, 1905)
- Lasioglossum intrepidum (Mitchell, 1960)
- Lasioglossum iranicum Ebmer, 1975
- Lasioglossum iridipenne (Smith, 1863)
- Lasioglossum israelense Ebmer, 1974
- Lasioglossum ituraeum Ebmer, 1972
- Lasioglossum iwatai Sakagami, 1968

=== J-K ===
- Lasioglossum jacobsoni (Friese, 1914)
- Lasioglossum jamaicae (Ellis, 1914)
- Lasioglossum jameseae (Cockerell, 1933)
- Lasioglossum japonicum (Dalla Torre, 1896)
- Lasioglossum jessicum (Cockerell, 1939)
- Lasioglossum jubatum (Vachal, 1904)
- Lasioglossum jultschinicum Ebmer, 1972
- Lasioglossum junaluskense (Mitchell, 1960)
- Lasioglossum kabetiellum (Cockerell, 1945)
- Lasioglossum kafubuense (Cockerell, 1937)
- Lasioglossum kampalense (Cockerell, 1945)
- Lasioglossum kandiense (Cockerell, 1913)
- Lasioglossum kangeani (Pauly, 1980)
- Lasioglossum kankauchare (Strand, 1914)
- Lasioglossum kansuense (Blüthgen, 1934)
- Lasioglossum kappadokium Ebmer, 1974
- Lasioglossum kasparyani Pesenko, 1986
- Lasioglossum kasuloi (Cockerell, 1937)
- Lasioglossum katyae McGinley, 1986
- Lasioglossum kiautschouense (Strand, 1910)
- Lasioglossum kinabaluense Michener, 1986
- Lasioglossum kincaidii (Cockerell, 1898)
- Lasioglossum kingi (Cockerell, 1945)
- Lasioglossum kintonense (Blüthgen, 1926)
- Lasioglossum kirgisicum Ebmer, 1972
- Lasioglossum klipiellum (Cockerell, 1946)
- Lasioglossum klooficum (Cockerell, 1946)
- Lasioglossum korbi (Blüthgen, 1929)
- Lasioglossum koreanum Ebmer, 1978
- Lasioglossum kotschyi (Ebmer, 1981)
- Lasioglossum kowitense (Cockerell, 1937)
- Lasioglossum kozlovi (Friese, 1914)
- Lasioglossum krausi (Warncke, 1982)
- Lasioglossum kraussi Michener, 1954
- Lasioglossum krishna (Nurse, 1902)
- Lasioglossum kryopetrosum Ebmer, 2002
- Lasioglossum kulense (Strand, 1909)
- Lasioglossum kumejimense (Matsumura & Uchida, 1926)
- Lasioglossum kunzei (Cockerell, 1898)
- Lasioglossum kurandense (Cockerell, 1914)
- Lasioglossum kuroshio Sakagami & Takahashi, 1993
- Lasioglossum kussariense (Blüthgen, 1925)

=== L ===
- Lasioglossum lactescens (Cockerell, 1937)
- Lasioglossum lacthium (Smith, 1853)
- Lasioglossum lactineum (Sandhouse, 1924)
- Lasioglossum laeve (Kirby, 1802)
- Lasioglossum laeviderme (Cockerell, 1911)
- Lasioglossum laevidorsum (Blüthgen, 1923)
- Lasioglossum laevigatum (Kirby, 1802)
- Lasioglossum laevinode (Morawitz, 1876)
- Lasioglossum laevissimum (Smith, 1853)
- Lasioglossum laevoides Ebmer, 2005
- Lasioglossum lambatum Fan & Ebmer, 1992
- Lasioglossum lamborni (Cockerell, 1945)
- Lasioglossum lamellosum Walker, 1995
- Lasioglossum lampronotum McGinley, 1986
- Lasioglossum lanarium (Smith, 1853)
- Lasioglossum laratellum (Blüthgen, 1926)
- Lasioglossum laraticum (Blüthgen, 1926)
- Lasioglossum lasereanum (Benoist, 1964)
- Lasioglossum laterale (Brullé, 1832)
- Lasioglossum laterocinctum (Cockerell, 1945)
- Lasioglossum latesellatum (Cockerell, 1937)
- Lasioglossum latibalteatum (Meade-Waldo, 1916)
- Lasioglossum laticeps (Schenck, 1870)
- Lasioglossum latichilum Walker, 1995
- Lasioglossum latifrontellum (Cockerell, 1945)
- Lasioglossum latilabrum Murao & Tadauchi, 2006
- Lasioglossum latior (Cockerell, 1939)
- Lasioglossum latissimum (Cockerell, 1915)
- Lasioglossum latitarse (Friese, 1909)
- Lasioglossum lativalve (Warncke, 1984)
- Lasioglossum lativentre (Schenck, 1853)
- Lasioglossum latro (Perkins & Cheesman, 1928)
- Lasioglossum latum (Sandhouse, 1924)
- Lasioglossum layardi (Cockerell, 1920)
- Lasioglossum lazulis (Ellis, 1913)
- Lasioglossum lebedevi Ebmer, 1972
- Lasioglossum lectum (Mitchell, 1960)
- Lasioglossum leichardti (Cockerell, 1906)
- Lasioglossum leiosoma (Strand, 1914)
- Lasioglossum lepidii (Graenicher, 1927)
- Lasioglossum leptocephalum (Blüthgen, 1923)
- Lasioglossum leptorhynchum (Blüthgen, 1931)
- Lasioglossum leptospermi (Cockerell, 1916)
- Lasioglossum lesseppsi (Cockerell, 1928)
- Lasioglossum leucocomum (Lovell, 1908)
- Lasioglossum leucomontanum (Ebmer, 1981)
- Lasioglossum leucophenax (Cockerell, 1939)
- Lasioglossum leucopus (Kirby, 1802)
- Lasioglossum leucopymatum (Dalla Torre, 1896)
- Lasioglossum leucorhinum (Cockerell, 1926)
- Lasioglossum leucozonium (Schrank, 1781)
- Lasioglossum leviense (Mitchell, 1960)
- Lasioglossum leviventre (Pérez, 1905)
- Lasioglossum libericum (Cockerell, 1945)
- Lasioglossum lichatinum (Cockerell, 1922)
- Lasioglossum lichatum (Smith, 1853)
- Lasioglossum lieftincki (Michener, 1980)
- Lasioglossum liguanense (Sandhouse, 1924)
- Lasioglossum limbelloides (Blüthgen, 1931)
- Lasioglossum limbellum (Morawitz, 1876)
- Lasioglossum linctum (Vachal, 1904)
- Lasioglossum lineare (Schenck, 1870)
- Lasioglossum lineatulum (Crawford, 1906)
- Lasioglossum lineatum Walker, 1995
- Lasioglossum lionotum (Sandhouse, 1923)
- Lasioglossum lippani (Cameron, 1905)
- Lasioglossum lisa Ebmer, 1998
- Lasioglossum lissonotum (Noskiewicz, 1926)
- Lasioglossum lithuscum (Smith, 1853)
- Lasioglossum litovillum Walker, 1995
- Lasioglossum littleri (Cockerell, 1914)
- Lasioglossum littorale (Blüthgen, 1924)
- Lasioglossum loetum (Brullé, 1840)
- Lasioglossum longicorne (Crawford, 1907)
- Lasioglossum longifacies Sakagami & Tadauchi, 1995
- Lasioglossum longifrons (Baker, 1906)
- Lasioglossum longirostre (Morawitz, 1876)
- Lasioglossum longmani (Cockerell, 1922)
- Lasioglossum lorentzi (Friese, 1911)
- Lasioglossum loweri (Cockerell, 1905)
- Lasioglossum lucidibase (Cockerell, 1943)
- Lasioglossum lucidulum (Schenck, 1861)
- Lasioglossum luctuosum Ebmer, 2002
- Lasioglossum lukulense (Cockerell, 1945)
- Lasioglossum luridipes (Vachal, 1892)
- Lasioglossum lusorium (Cresson, 1872)
- Lasioglossum lustrans (Cockerell, 1897)
- Lasioglossum lustricolle (Moure & Hurd, 1987)
- Lasioglossum luteipes (Friese, 1909)
- Lasioglossum luteoaeneum (Friese, 1924)

=== M ===
- Lasioglossum mabangense (Cockerell, 1946)
- Lasioglossum macilentum (Benoist, 1944)
- Lasioglossum mackiae (Cockerell, 1929)
- Lasioglossum macoupinense (Robertson, 1895)
- Lasioglossum macrops (Cockerell, 1916)
- Lasioglossum macrurops (Cockerell, 1937)
- Lasioglossum macrurum (Cockerell, 1931)
- Lasioglossum mactum (Sandhouse, 1924)
- Lasioglossum maculipes (Morawitz, 1876)
- Lasioglossum magdalena (Baker, 1906)
- Lasioglossum mahense (Cameron, 1908)
- Lasioglossum maidli (Blüthgen, 1925)
- Lasioglossum maitlandi (Cockerell, 1910)
- Lasioglossum majus (Nylander, 1852)
- Lasioglossum malachurum (Kirby, 1802)
- Lasioglossum malgiense (Pauly, 1986)
- Lasioglossum malinum (Sandhouse, 1924)
- Lasioglossum mandibulare (Morawitz, 1866)
- Lasioglossum manitouellum (Cockerell, 1908)
- Lasioglossum margelanicum Ebmer, 1972
- Lasioglossum marginatum (Brullé, 1832)
- Lasioglossum marginellum (Schenck, 1853)
- Lasioglossum marinense (Michener, 1936)
- Lasioglossum marinum (Crawford, 1904)
- Lasioglossum mariuticum (Blüthgen, 1934)
- Lasioglossum marshalli (Cockerell, 1937)
- Lasioglossum masaiense (Cockerell, 1945)
- Lasioglossum masculum (Pérez, 1895)
- Lasioglossum massuricum (Blüthgen, 1926)
- Lasioglossum mataroa Donovan, 2007
- Lasioglossum matianense (Blüthgen, 1926)
- Lasioglossum matopiense (Cockerell, 1940)
- Lasioglossum matoporum (Cockerell, 1934)
- Lasioglossum maunga Donovan, 2007
- Lasioglossum maurusium (Blüthgen, 1935)
- Lasioglossum mazicum (Cockerell, 1946)
- Lasioglossum mediocre (Benoist, 1962)
- Lasioglossum mediopolitum (Cockerell, 1914)
- Lasioglossum mediterraneum (Blüthgen, 1926)
- Lasioglossum megagnathum (Walker, 1997)
- Lasioglossum megastictum (Cockerell, 1937)
- Lasioglossum megastigmum (Cockerell, 1926)
- Lasioglossum melachloron Ebmer, 1983
- Lasioglossum melan Ebmer, 1980
- Lasioglossum melancholicum Ebmer, 2002
- Lasioglossum melanops Ebmer, 1985
- Lasioglossum melanopterum (Cockerell, 1914)
- Lasioglossum melanopus (Dalla Torre, 1896)
- Lasioglossum melanurum (Cockerell, 1919)
- Lasioglossum melbournense (Cockerell, 1904)
- Lasioglossum melli Ebmer, 1996
- Lasioglossum mellipes (Crawford, 1907)
- Lasioglossum mendocinense (Michener, 1936)
- Lasioglossum meneliki (Friese, 1915)
- Lasioglossum mergense (Blüthgen, 1924)
- Lasioglossum meritum (Sandhouse, 1924)
- Lasioglossum merosum (Sandhouse, 1924)
- Lasioglossum meruense (Friese, 1909)
- Lasioglossum mesembryanthemi (Cockerell, 1926)
- Lasioglossum mesillense (Cockerell, 1898)
- Lasioglossum mesopolitum (Cockerell, 1937)
- Lasioglossum mesosclerum (Pérez, 1903)
- Lasioglossum mesostenoideum Walker, 1995
- Lasioglossum mesoviride Ebmer, 1974
- Lasioglossum messoropse Ebmer, 2002
- Lasioglossum mestrei (Baker, 1906)
- Lasioglossum metallicum Walker, 1995
- Lasioglossum metis Ebmer, 2002
- Lasioglossum micante Michener, 1993
- Lasioglossum michaelinum (Cockerell, 1946)
- Lasioglossum michaelseni (Friese, 1916)
- Lasioglossum micheneri (Moure, 1956)
- Lasioglossum micheneri (Pauly, 1986)
- Lasioglossum michiganense (Mitchell, 1960)
- Lasioglossum microdontum (Cockerell, 1912)
- Lasioglossum microlepoides (Ellis, 1914)
- Lasioglossum microsellatum (Cockerell, 1945)
- Lasioglossum miguelense (Cockerell, 1937)
- Lasioglossum milneri (Cockerell, 1941)
- Lasioglossum milpa Landaverde-González, 2023
- Lasioglossum miniatulum (Mitchell, 1960)
- Lasioglossum minutissimum (Kirby, 1802)
- Lasioglossum minutuloides Ebmer, 1978
- Lasioglossum minutulum (Schenck, 1853)
- Lasioglossum minutum (Fabricius, 1798)
- Lasioglossum minutum (Pauly, 1986)
- Lasioglossum mirandum (Cockerell, 1914)
- Lasioglossum mirifrons (Cockerell, 1939)
- Lasioglossum miyabei Murao, Ebmer & Tadauchi, 2006
- Lasioglossum miyanoi Tadauchi, 1994
- Lasioglossum moderatum (Benoist, 1962)
- Lasioglossum modestum (Benoist, 1944)
- Lasioglossum moearae (Pauly, 1980)
- Lasioglossum molle (Sandhouse, 1924)
- Lasioglossum monodontum (Cockerell, 1941)
- Lasioglossum monsleone (Cockerell, 1946)
- Lasioglossum monstrificum (Morawitz, 1891)
- Lasioglossum montanum (Friese, 1909)
- Lasioglossum montifringillum (Warncke, 1984)
- Lasioglossum montivolans Ebmer, 1970
- Lasioglossum moreense (Cockerell, 1930)
- Lasioglossum morio (Fabricius, 1793)
- Lasioglossum morobeense (Pauly, 1986)
- Lasioglossum moros Ebmer, 2002
- Lasioglossum morrilli (Cockerell, 1919)
- Lasioglossum mose Ebmer, 1974
- Lasioglossum mosselinum (Cockerell, 1945)
- Lasioglossum mu Walker, 1995
- Lasioglossum muganinum (Blüthgen, 1931)
- Lasioglossum muiri (Cockerell, 1946)
- Lasioglossum multicavum (Walker, 1986)
- Lasioglossum mulungense (Cockerell, 1937)
- Lasioglossum mundulum (Cockerell, 1916)
- Lasioglossum murrayi (Cockerell, 1905)
- Lasioglossum musculoides Ebmer, 1974
- Lasioglossum musgravei (Cockerell, 1929)
- Lasioglossum musicum (Cockerell, 1913)
- Lasioglossum mutilum (Vachal, 1903)
- Lasioglossum mystaphium Ebmer, 2002
- Lasioglossum mystron Hinojosa-Díaz, 2003

=== N ===
- Lasioglossum nabardicum (Blüthgen, 1931)
- Lasioglossum nairobicum (Cockerell, 1945)
- Lasioglossum nairobiense (Cockerell, 1945)
- Lasioglossum naitoi Ebmer & Maeta, 1994
- Lasioglossum namaense (Friese, 1909)
- Lasioglossum nanotegula Landaverde-González & Husemann, 2023
- Lasioglossum nanum (Smith, 1879)
- Lasioglossum natalicum (Cockerell, 1943)
- Lasioglossum natense (Cockerell, 1935)
- Lasioglossum nathanae Pauly, 2001
- Lasioglossum nefrens Walker, 1995
- Lasioglossum nelumbonis (Robertson, 1890)
- Lasioglossum nemorale Ebmer, 2006
- Lasioglossum neurophlaurum (Moure, 1956)
- Lasioglossum nevadense (Crawford, 1907)
- Lasioglossum nialense (Cockerell, 1945)
- Lasioglossum nicias Ebmer, 1997
- Lasioglossum nicolli (Cockerell, 1912)
- Lasioglossum nigrescens (Crawford, 1907)
- Lasioglossum nigricalle (Vachal, 1904)
- Lasioglossum nigriceps (Morawitz, 1880)
- Lasioglossum nigridens (Vachal, 1904)
- Lasioglossum nigrilabre (Morawitz, 1876)
- Lasioglossum nigrimente (Cockerell, 1937)
- Lasioglossum nigripes (Lepeletier, 1841)
- Lasioglossum nigritellum (Cockerell, 1937)
- Lasioglossum nigritinum (Cockerell, 1937)
- Lasioglossum nigritulinum (Cockerell, 1945)
- Lasioglossum nigroaeneum (Friese, 1917)
- Lasioglossum nigropolitum (Cockerell, 1929)
- Lasioglossum nigroviride (Graenicher, 1911)
- Lasioglossum nigrum (Viereck, 1903)
- Lasioglossum nipponense (Hirashima, 1953)
- Lasioglossum nipponicola Sakagami & Tadauchi, 1995
- Lasioglossum nitens Walker, 1995
- Lasioglossum nitidibase (Cockerell, 1941)
- Lasioglossum nitididorsatum (Benoist, 1950)
- Lasioglossum nitidiusculum (Kirby, 1802)
- Lasioglossum nitidulum (Fabricius, 1804)
- Lasioglossum niveatum (Meyer, 1920)
- Lasioglossum niveifrons (Cockerell, 1914)
- Lasioglossum niveocinctum (Blüthgen, 1923)
- Lasioglossum niveorufum (Friese, 1924)
- Lasioglossum niveostictum (Cockerell, 1937)
- Lasioglossum noachinum (Cockerell, 1914)
- Lasioglossum noctivaga Linsley & MacSwain, 1962
- Lasioglossum nodicorne (Morawitz, 1889)
- Lasioglossum nomion Ebmer, 1998
- Lasioglossum normale (Baker, 1906)
- Lasioglossum norvali (Cockerell, 1939)
- Lasioglossum notescens (Cockerell, 1930)
- Lasioglossum novascotiae (Mitchell, 1960)
- Lasioglossum nudatum (Benoist, 1962)
- Lasioglossum nudulum (Vachal, 1903)
- Lasioglossum nummatum (Krombein, 1950)
- Lasioglossum nupricola Sakagami, 1988
- Lasioglossum nursei (Blüthgen, 1926)
- Lasioglossum nusaense (Cockerell, 1919)
- Lasioglossum nyasense (Cockerell, 1945)
- Lasioglossum nyctere (Vachal, 1904)
- Lasioglossum nymphaearum (Robertson, 1895)
- Lasioglossum nymphale (Smith, 1853)

=== O ===
- Lasioglossum oaxacacola Engel, Hinojosa-Díaz & Yáñez-Ordóñez, 2007
- Lasioglossum obliteratum (Cockerell, 1937)
- Lasioglossum oblitum (Smith, 1879)
- Lasioglossum oblongum (Lovell, 1905)
- Lasioglossum obnubilum (Sandhouse, 1924)
- Lasioglossum obscuratum (Morawitz, 1876)
- Lasioglossum obscurior (Friese, 1925)
- Lasioglossum obscuripes (Friese, 1917)
- Lasioglossum obscurissimum Michener, 1965
- Lasioglossum obscurum (Robertson, 1892)
- Lasioglossum occidens (Smith, 1873)
- Lasioglossum occidentale (Crawford, 1902)
- Lasioglossum occiduum Walker, 1999
- Lasioglossum occultum (Vachal, 1904)
- Lasioglossum oceanicum
- Lasioglossum ocellare (Michener, 1980)
- Lasioglossum ochreohirtum (Blüthgen, 1934)
- Lasioglossum ochrochilum Walker, 1995
- Lasioglossum ochroma Walker, 1995
- Lasioglossum odyneroides (Rayment, 1939)
- Lasioglossum oenotherae (Stevens, 1920)
- Lasioglossum ohei Hirashima & Sakagami, 1966
- Lasioglossum okinawa Ebmer & Maeta, 1999
- Lasioglossum oleosum (Cockerell, 1898)
- Lasioglossum olgae (Rayment, 1935)
- Lasioglossum olivaceum (Morawitz, 1889)
- Lasioglossum olympiae (Cockerell, 1898)
- Lasioglossum omnipunctatum Ebmer, 2004
- Lasioglossum onocephalum Ebmer, 1996
- Lasioglossum opacicolle (Cockerell, 1914)
- Lasioglossum opacolampron Ebmer, 1997
- Lasioglossum opaconitens (Blüthgen, 1931)
- Lasioglossum opacum (Pérez, 1895)
- Lasioglossum opacum (Moure, 1940)
- Lasioglossum opisthochlorum (Cockerell, 1919)
- Lasioglossum oppositum (Smith, 1875)
- Lasioglossum oraniense (Blüthgen, 1930)
- Lasioglossum orbatum (Smith, 1853)
- Lasioglossum orbitatum Mitchell, 1960
- Lasioglossum orbitulum Ebmer, 1997
- Lasioglossum ordubadense (Friese, 1916)
- Lasioglossum orihuelicum (Blüthgen, 1924)
- Lasioglossum orion Ebmer, 1974
- Lasioglossum ornduffi (Hurd, 1970)
- Lasioglossum orpheopse (Blüthgen, 1931)
- Lasioglossum orpheum (Nurse, 1904)
- Lasioglossum orphnaeum McGinley, 1986
- Lasioglossum orthocarpi (Michener, 1936)
- Lasioglossum osiris Ebmer, 1986
- Lasioglossum osmioides (Ducke, 1902)
- Lasioglossum otsegoense (Mitchell, 1960)
- Lasioglossum ounuense (Cheesman & Perkins, 1939)
- Lasioglossum ovaliceps (Cockerell, 1898)

=== P ===
- Lasioglossum pabulator (Schrottky, 1910)
- Lasioglossum pacatum (Sandhouse, 1924)
- Lasioglossum pachyacanthum (Cockerell, 1937)
- Lasioglossum pachycephalum (Cockerell, 1916)
- Lasioglossum pacificum (Cockerell, 1898)
- Lasioglossum paitense (Cockerell, 1926)
- Lasioglossum palaonicum (Cockerell, 1939)
- Lasioglossum palapyense (Cockerell, 1942)
- Lasioglossum paleae Ebmer, 1972
- Lasioglossum pallens (Brullé, 1832)
- Lasioglossum pallicorne (Vachal, 1904)
- Lasioglossum pallidellum (Ellis, 1914)
- Lasioglossum pallidum (Radoszkowski, 1888)
- Lasioglossum pallilomum (Strand, 1914)
- Lasioglossum panagaeum Ebmer, 1978
- Lasioglossum pandrose Ebmer, 2002
- Lasioglossum pappodum Walker, 1995
- Lasioglossum papuarum (Cockerell, 1910)
- Lasioglossum paradmirandum (Knerer & Atwood, 1966)
- Lasioglossum paradnanum (Strand, 1914)
- Lasioglossum paraforbesii McGinley, 1986
- Lasioglossum paralepidii Gardner, 2023
- Lasioglossum paralphenum Sakagami, Ebmer & Tadauchi, 1996
- Lasioglossum paramelaenum (Cockerell, 1922)
- Lasioglossum paramorio (Friese, 1908)
- Lasioglossum parapastinum (Cockerell, 1940)
- Lasioglossum parasphecodum Walker, 1995
- Lasioglossum parkeri McGinley, 1986
- Lasioglossum parvulinum (Cockerell, 1939)
- Lasioglossum parvulum (Schenck, 1853)
- Lasioglossum parvum (Cresson, 1865)
- Lasioglossum pastinimimum (Cockerell, 1939)
- Lasioglossum patongense (Rayment, 1948)
- Lasioglossum pauliani (Benoist, 1941)
- Lasioglossum paululum (Sandhouse, 1924)
- Lasioglossum pauperatum (Brullé, 1832)
- Lasioglossum pauxillum (Schenck, 1853)
- Lasioglossum pavo Sakagami, 1989
- Lasioglossum pavoninum (Ellis, 1913)
- Lasioglossum pavonotum (Cockerell, 1925)
- Lasioglossum paxtoni Landaverde-González, 2023
- Lasioglossum pecosense (Crawford, 1906)
- Lasioglossum pectinalus (Walker, 1986)
- Lasioglossum pectinatum (Robertson, 1890)
- Lasioglossum pectorale (Smith, 1853)
- Lasioglossum pectoraloides (Cockerell, 1895)
- Lasioglossum pellitosinum (Cockerell, 1946)
- Lasioglossum pellitosum (Cockerell, 1934)
- Lasioglossum pelorodontum (Michener, 1980)
- Lasioglossum pembense (Cockerell, 1945)
- Lasioglossum pendschakenticum (Blüthgen, 1935)
- Lasioglossum pensitum (Sandhouse, 1924)
- Lasioglossum perakense (Blüthgen, 1928)
- Lasioglossum peralpinum (Cockerell, 1919)
- Lasioglossum peraltum (Cockerell, 1901)
- Lasioglossum peratrum (Cockerell, 1927)
- Lasioglossum peraustrale (Cockerell, 1904)
- Lasioglossum percingulatum (Rayment, 1935)
- Lasioglossum perclavipes (Blüthgen, 1934)
- Lasioglossum percornutum (Cockerell, 1937)
- Lasioglossum percrassiceps (Cockerell, 1931)
- Lasioglossum perdifficile (Cockerell, 1895)
- Lasioglossum peregrinum (Blüthgen, 1923)
- Lasioglossum perexiguum (Sandhouse, 1924)
- Lasioglossum perichlarum (Cockerell, 1937)
- Lasioglossum pericinctum (Cockerell, 1937)
- Lasioglossum perihirtulum (Cockerell, 1937)
- Lasioglossum perihirtum (Cockerell, 1933)
- Lasioglossum permetallicum Michener, 1965
- Lasioglossum pernitens (Cockerell, 1934)
- Lasioglossum pernotescens (Cockerell, 1934)
- Lasioglossum perparvum (Ellis, 1914)
- Lasioglossum perpessicium (Kohl, 1908)
- Lasioglossum perplexans (Cockerell, 1925)
- Lasioglossum perpunctatulum (Knerer & Atwood, 1966)
- Lasioglossum perpunctatum (Ellis, 1913)
- Lasioglossum perscabrum McGinley, 1986
- Lasioglossum persicum Cockerell, 1919
- Lasioglossum perspicuum (Knerer & Atwood, 1966)
- Lasioglossum pertasmaniae (Rayment, 1953)
- Lasioglossum pertribuarium (Rayment, 1935)
- Lasioglossum perustum (Cockerell, 1914)
- Lasioglossum pervarians (Cockerell, 1919)
- Lasioglossum petrellum (Cockerell, 1903)
- Lasioglossum phaceliarum (Cockerell, 1919)
- Lasioglossum phaedrum (Schrottky, 1910)
- Lasioglossum pharum (Vachal, 1904)
- Lasioglossum pheidolopse (Blüthgen, 1926)
- Lasioglossum phenacorhinum (Cockerell, 1942)
- Lasioglossum philanthanum (Mitchell, 1960)
- Lasioglossum phleboleucum (Moure, 1956)
- Lasioglossum phoebos Ebmer, 1978
- Lasioglossum phoenicurum (Warncke, 1975)
- Lasioglossum picadense (Strand, 1910)
- Lasioglossum picipes (Morawitz, 1876)
- Lasioglossum picticorne (Cockerell, 1930)
- Lasioglossum pictum (Crawford, 1902)
- Lasioglossum pikei (Sandhouse, 1924)
- Lasioglossum pilicorne (Friese, 1930)
- Lasioglossum pilosellum (Cockerell, 1936)
- Lasioglossum pilosicaudus (Cockerell, 1937)
- Lasioglossum pilosigyna (Walker, 1997)
- Lasioglossum pilositarsis (Pauly, 1986)
- Lasioglossum pilosum (Smith, 1853)
- Lasioglossum pineolense (Mitchell, 1960)
- Lasioglossum pinnatum (Vachal, 1910)
- Lasioglossum pistorium (Vachal, 1902)
- Lasioglossum plasunicum (Blüthgen, 1926)
- Lasioglossum platycephalum (Rayment, 1927)
- Lasioglossum platychilum Walker, 1999
- Lasioglossum platyparium (Robertson, 1895)
- Lasioglossum plebeium (Cockerell, 1914)
- Lasioglossum pleurospeculum Herrmann, 2001
- Lasioglossum plicatinum (Cockerell, 1937)
- Lasioglossum plorator (Cockerell, 1910)
- Lasioglossum plumbeum (Ashmead, 1900)
- Lasioglossum podolicum (Noskiewicz, 1925)
- Lasioglossum politescens (Cockerell, 1937)
- Lasioglossum politum (Schenck, 1853)
- Lasioglossum pollux Walker, 1995
- Lasioglossum polyctor (Bingham, 1908)
- Lasioglossum polygoni (Cockerell, 1929)
- Lasioglossum popovi (Blüthgen, 1931)
- Lasioglossum posthirtum (Cockerell, 1946)
- Lasioglossum postnitens (Cockerell, 1946)
- Lasioglossum postpictum (Cockerell, 1937)
- Lasioglossum postumum (Vachal, 1903)
- Lasioglossum potaroense (Cockerell, 1930)
- Lasioglossum potosi (McGinley, 2003)
- Lasioglossum praepes (Sandhouse, 1924)
- Lasioglossum prasinum (Smith, 1848)
- Lasioglossum pressithorax Ebmer, 1974
- Lasioglossum primavera Sakagami & Maeta, 1990
- Lasioglossum problematicum (Blüthgen, 1923)
- Lasioglossum prominens (Cockerell, 1937)
- Lasioglossum pronotale Ebmer, 2002
- Lasioglossum providens (Smith, 1879)
- Lasioglossum proximatum (Smith, 1879)
- Lasioglossum proximum (Rayment, 1947)
- Lasioglossum pruinosiforme (Crawford, 1906)
- Lasioglossum pruinosum (Robertson, 1892)
- Lasioglossum prunellum (Warncke, 1975)
- Lasioglossum przewalskyi (Blüthgen, 1931)
- Lasioglossum pseudocaspicum (Blüthgen, 1923)
- Lasioglossum pseudoccidens (Blüthgen, 1926)
- Lasioglossum pseudofallax (Blüthgen, 1923)
- Lasioglossum pseudoleptocephalum (Blüthgen, 1923)
- Lasioglossum pseudoleptorhynchum (Blüthgen, 1931)
- Lasioglossum pseudolittorale (Blüthgen, 1923)
- Lasioglossum pseudonigripes (Blüthgen, 1934)
- Lasioglossum pseudopalmeri (Blüthgen, 1926)
- Lasioglossum pseudopectorale (Cockerell, 1896)
- Lasioglossum pseudoplanulum (Blüthgen, 1924)
- Lasioglossum pseudosphecodimorphum (Blüthgen, 1923)
- Lasioglossum pseudotegulare (Cockerell, 1896)
- Lasioglossum ptyon Walker, 1995
- Lasioglossum pudicum (Sandhouse, 1924)
- Lasioglossum pulchripes (Cockerell, 1937)
- Lasioglossum pulchritarse (Cockerell, 1940)
- Lasioglossum pulicarium (Warncke, 1975)
- Lasioglossum pullilabre (Vachal, 1904)
- Lasioglossum pulveris (Cockerell, 1930)
- Lasioglossum pulvitectum (Cockerell, 1915)
- Lasioglossum pumilum Sakagami & Tadauchi, 1995
- Lasioglossum punctatissimum (Schenck, 1853)
- Lasioglossum punctatoventre (Crawford, 1907)
- Lasioglossum punctatum (Smith, 1858)
- Lasioglossum puncticolle (Morawitz, 1872)
- Lasioglossum punctiferellum (Cockerell, 1937)
- Lasioglossum punctifrons (Crawford, 1914)
- Lasioglossum puzeyi (Cockerell, 1939)
- Lasioglossum pygmaeum (Schenck, 1853)

=== Q-R ===
- Lasioglossum quadratum Walker, 1995
- Lasioglossum quadrinotatiforme Ebmer, 1980
- Lasioglossum quadrinotatulum (Schenck, 1861)
- Lasioglossum quadrinotatum (Kirby, 1802)
- Lasioglossum quadrisignatum (Schenck, 1853)
- Lasioglossum quebecense (Crawford, 1907)
- Lasioglossum radiatulum (Cockerell, 1937)
- Lasioglossum ragusanum (Blüthgen, 1931)
- Lasioglossum raleighense (Crawford, 1932)
- Lasioglossum ralunicolum (Friese, 1909)
- Lasioglossum ramphos Ebmer, 1997
- Lasioglossum ranacum (Pauly, 1980)
- Lasioglossum recantans (Cockerell, 1912)
- Lasioglossum recessum (Cockerell, 1914)
- Lasioglossum recessum (Cockerell, 1937)
- Lasioglossum redivivum (Blüthgen, 1928)
- Lasioglossum reenenicum (Cockerell, 1941)
- Lasioglossum regis (Cockerell, 1916)
- Lasioglossum repertulum (Cockerell, 1916)
- Lasioglossum repraesentans (Smith, 1853)
- Lasioglossum respersiforme (Cockerell, 1919)
- Lasioglossum respersum (Vachal, 1904)
- Lasioglossum resplendens (Morawitz, 1890)
- Lasioglossum reticulatum (Robertson, 1892)
- Lasioglossum reticulellum (Cockerell, 1946)
- Lasioglossum rhadiourgon Ebmer, 1980
- Lasioglossum rhodognathum (Cockerell, 1917)
- Lasioglossum rhodopterum (Cockerell, 1914)
- Lasioglossum rhynchites (Morawitz, 1876)
- Lasioglossum rhytidophorum (Moure, 1956)
- Lasioglossum richardsoni (Cockerell, 1937)
- Lasioglossum risbeci (Cockerell, 1929)
- Lasioglossum robertianum (Cameron, 1905)
- Lasioglossum robertsonellum Michener, 1951
- Lasioglossum robertsoni (Crawford, 1906)
- Lasioglossum robustum (Crawford, 1907)
- Lasioglossum roddi Walker, 1995
- Lasioglossum rohweri (Ellis, 1915)
- Lasioglossum rostratum (Eversmann, 1852)
- Lasioglossum rostratum (Moure, 1947)
- Lasioglossum rotaense (Cockerell, 1942)
- Lasioglossum rowlandi (Cockerell, 1910)
- Lasioglossum rubricaudis (Cameron, 1905)
- Lasioglossum rubripes (Alfken, 1932)
- Lasioglossum rubritarse (Cockerell, 1937)
- Lasioglossum rubrocinctum (Cockerell, 1945)
- Lasioglossum rubsectum Fan & Ebmer, 1992
- Lasioglossum rufibase (Cockerell, 1923)
- Lasioglossum ruficolle (Friese, 1924)
- Lasioglossum ruficorne (Crawford, 1907)
- Lasioglossum rufimente (Cockerell, 1937)
- Lasioglossum rufiscopa (Pauly, 1986)
- Lasioglossum rufitarse (Zetterstedt, 1838)
- Lasioglossum rufitarsellum (Cockerell, 1940)
- Lasioglossum rufitarsum (Rayment, 1929)
- Lasioglossum rufoaeneum (Friese, 1925)
- Lasioglossum rufocollare (Cockerell, 1930)
- Lasioglossum rufomarginatum (Smith, 1853)
- Lasioglossum rufopantex (Engel, 2001)
- Lasioglossum rufopurpureum (Pauly, 1986)
- Lasioglossum rufotegulare (Cockerell, 1914)
- Lasioglossum rufotibiale (Friese, 1925)
- Lasioglossum rufulipes (Cockerell, 1938)
- Lasioglossum rufulum (Friese, 1924)
- Lasioglossum rugifrons (Blüthgen, 1926)
- Lasioglossum rugolatum (Smith, 1853)
- Lasioglossum ruidosense (Cockerell, 1897)
- Lasioglossum rupestre (Warncke, 1984)
- Lasioglossum rupticristum McGinley, 1986
- Lasioglossum rusticolum (Warncke, 1982)
- Lasioglossum ruwenzicum (Cockerell, 1945)
- Lasioglossum ruwenzoriellum (Cockerell, 1945)

=== S ===
- Lasioglossum sablense (Gibbs, 2010)
- Lasioglossum sabulosum (Warncke, 1986)
- Lasioglossum saegeri Pauly, 1981
- Lasioglossum saffordi (Cockerell, 1914)
- Lasioglossum sagax (Sandhouse, 1924)
- Lasioglossum sakagamii Ebmer, 1978
- Lasioglossum sakishima Ebmer & Maeta, 1999
- Lasioglossum salebrosum (Blüthgen, 1934)
- Lasioglossum salinaecola (Friese, 1916)
- Lasioglossum salinum (Morawitz, 1876)
- Lasioglossum salutatrix (Cameron, 1897)
- Lasioglossum samarense (Blüthgen, 1926)
- Lasioglossum samaricum (Blüthgen, 1935)
- Lasioglossum samoae (Perkins & Cheesman, 1928)
- Lasioglossum sanctivincenti (Ashmead, 1900)
- Lasioglossum sandhouseae Michener, 1951
- Lasioglossum sandrae McGinley, 1986
- Lasioglossum sanfrancisconis (Strand, 1917)
- Lasioglossum sanitarium (Blüthgen, 1926)
- Lasioglossum sarticum (Blüthgen, 1934)
- Lasioglossum satschauense (Blüthgen, 1934)
- Lasioglossum sauterum Fan & Ebmer, 1992
- Lasioglossum saxatile (Warncke, 1984)
- Lasioglossum scabrosum (Pauly, 1986)
- Lasioglossum scaphonotum (Strand, 1914)
- Lasioglossum schachti (Warncke, 1984)
- Lasioglossum scheherezade Ebmer, 2000
- Lasioglossum schomburgki (Cockerell, 1910)
- Lasioglossum schubotzi (Strand, 1911)
- Lasioglossum schwarzi Ebmer, 1985
- Lasioglossum scirpaceum (Warncke, 1975)
- Lasioglossum scitulum (Smith, 1873)
- Lasioglossum scobe (Vachal, 1903)
- Lasioglossum scopaceum (Friese, 1914)
- Lasioglossum scoteinum Ebmer, 1998
- Lasioglossum scrophulariae (Cockerell, 1906)
- Lasioglossum scrupulosum (Cockerell, 1930)
- Lasioglossum sculpturatum (Cockerell, 1930)
- Lasioglossum scutellare (Morawitz, 1876)
- Lasioglossum scutolactescens (Pauly, 1986)
- Lasioglossum scutopruinescens (Pauly, 1986)
- Lasioglossum seabrai (Moure, 1956)
- Lasioglossum sedi (Sandhouse, 1924)
- Lasioglossum sedlaceki (Michener, 1980)
- Lasioglossum seductum (Cockerell, 1914)
- Lasioglossum sellatiferum (Cockerell, 1945)
- Lasioglossum selma Ebmer, 2002
- Lasioglossum semibrunneum (Cockerell, 1895)
- Lasioglossum semicaeruleum (Cockerell, 1895)
- Lasioglossum semicyaneum (Cockerell, 1929)
- Lasioglossum semidiversum (Cockerell, 1940)
- Lasioglossum semilaeve (Blüthgen, 1923)
- Lasioglossum semilucens (Alfken, 1914)
- Lasioglossum semilucidum (Cockerell, 1945)
- Lasioglossum seminitens (Cockerell, 1929)
- Lasioglossum semiplicatum (Cockerell, 1943)
- Lasioglossum semipolitum (Cockerell, 1916)
- Lasioglossum semisculptum (Cockerell, 1911)
- Lasioglossum semiviride (Friese, 1909)
- Lasioglossum sequoiae (Michener, 1936)
- Lasioglossum serenum (Cameron, 1897)
- Lasioglossum seriatum Walker, 1999
- Lasioglossum serratum (Blüthgen, 1926)
- Lasioglossum sertum (Vachal, 1904)
- Lasioglossum setulellum (Strand, 1909)
- Lasioglossum setulosum (Strand, 1909)
- Lasioglossum sexmaculatum (Schenck, 1853)
- Lasioglossum sexnotatulum (Nylander, 1852)
- Lasioglossum sexnotatum (Kirby, 1802)
- Lasioglossum sexsetum Walker, 1995
- Lasioglossum sexstrigatum (Schenck, 1870)
- Lasioglossum sextum (Cockerell, 1910)
- Lasioglossum shanganiense (Cockerell, 1937)
- Lasioglossum sharpi (Cockerell, 1946)
- Lasioglossum shendicum (Cockerell, 1945)
- Lasioglossum shestakovi Pesenko, 1986
- Lasioglossum shillongense (Blüthgen, 1926)
- Lasioglossum shoichi Ebmer, 2004
- Lasioglossum sibiriacum (Blüthgen, 1923)
- Lasioglossum sibuyanense (Blüthgen, 1926)
- Lasioglossum sicarium (Walker, 1997)
- Lasioglossum sichuanense Fan & Ebmer, 1992
- Lasioglossum sierramaestrensis Genaro, 2001
- Lasioglossum signicostatuloides (Strand, 1914)
- Lasioglossum siirtense (Warncke, 1984)
- Lasioglossum sikkimense (Blüthgen, 1926)
- Lasioglossum silvestris (Michener, 1980)
- Lasioglossum simlaense (Cameron, 1909)
- Lasioglossum simplex (Robertson, 1901)
- Lasioglossum simplicior (Cockerell, 1931)
- Lasioglossum simulator (Cockerell, 1935)
- Lasioglossum singapurellum (Blüthgen, 1926)
- Lasioglossum singhalense (Blüthgen, 1931)
- Lasioglossum sinicum (Blüthgen, 1934)
- Lasioglossum sisymbrii (Cockerell, 1895)
- Lasioglossum skorikovi (Blüthgen, 1929)
- Lasioglossum smaragdinum Walker, 1995
- Lasioglossum smeathmanellum (Kirby, 1802)
- Lasioglossum smilodon Ebmer & Sakagami, 1994
- Lasioglossum snelli (Cockerell, 1937)
- Lasioglossum sobrinum (Warncke, 1982)
- Lasioglossum socorium (Blüthgen, 1924)
- Lasioglossum solidaginis (Mitchell, 1960)
- Lasioglossum solis (Cockerell, 1922)
- Lasioglossum solisortus Ebmer & Maeta, 1994
- Lasioglossum solitarium (Warncke, 1975)
- Lasioglossum somereni (Cockerell, 1945)
- Lasioglossum sopinci (Crawford, 1932)
- Lasioglossum sordidulum (Cockerell, 1914)
- Lasioglossum sordidum (Smith, 1853)
- Lasioglossum soror (Saunders, 1901)
- Lasioglossum sororculum Walker, 1999
- Lasioglossum spatulatum Walker, 1995
- Lasioglossum speculatum Walker, 1995
- Lasioglossum speculellum (Cockerell, 1918)
- Lasioglossum speculiferum (Cockerell, 1912)
- Lasioglossum speculinum (Cockerell, 1925)
- Lasioglossum speculum (Benoist, 1964)
- Lasioglossum sphecodicolor Sakagami & Tadauchi, 1995
- Lasioglossum sphecodimorphum (Vachal, 1892)
- Lasioglossum sphecodoides (Smith, 1853)
- Lasioglossum sphecodopse (Cockerell, 1905)
- Lasioglossum spinale (Vachal, 1904)
- Lasioglossum spinodorsum Fan & Wu, 1991
- Lasioglossum spinolae (Reed, 1892)
- Lasioglossum spinosum Ebmer, 1982
- Lasioglossum spinosum (Pauly, 1986)
- Lasioglossum splendidulum (Vachal, 1895)
- Lasioglossum spodiozonium (Vachal, 1895)
- Lasioglossum squamiceps (Strand, 1912)
- Lasioglossum squamosus (Pauly, 1984)
- Lasioglossum stellatifrons (Cockerell, 1945)
- Lasioglossum stenorhynchum (Blüthgen, 1928)
- Lasioglossum stevensoni (Cockerell, 1924)
- Lasioglossum stictaspis (Sandhouse, 1923)
- Lasioglossum stolidum (Warncke, 1982)
- Lasioglossum stradbrokense (Cockerell, 1916)
- Lasioglossum striatum Walker, 1995
- Lasioglossum strictifrons (Vachal, 1895)
- Lasioglossum strigilalium (Pauly, 1986)
- Lasioglossum strigosigena Michener, 1954
- Lasioglossum stuartense (Mitchell, 1960)
- Lasioglossum stuchilum (Smith, 1853)
- Lasioglossum sturti (Cockerell, 1906)
- Lasioglossum subaenescens (Pérez, 1896)
- Lasioglossum subbuteo (Warncke, 1982)
- Lasioglossum subcarum (Cockerell, 1930)
- Lasioglossum subcyaneum (Ashmead, 1900)
- Lasioglossum subdeclivis (Pauly, 1980)
- Lasioglossum subequestre (Blüthgen, 1931)
- Lasioglossum subexterum (Cockerell, 1939)
- Lasioglossum subfasciatum (Imhoff, 1832)
- Lasioglossum subfratellum (Blüthgen, 1934)
- Lasioglossum subfulgens Fan & Ebmer, 1992
- Lasioglossum subfultoni (Cockerell, 1930)
- Lasioglossum subfulvicorne (Blüthgen, 1934)
- Lasioglossum subglobosum (Blüthgen, 1926)
- Lasioglossum subhirtum (Lepeletier, 1841)
- Lasioglossum sublatens (Cockerell, 1926)
- Lasioglossum sublaterale (Blüthgen, 1931)
- Lasioglossum sublautum (Cockerell, 1942)
- Lasioglossum subleiosoma (Blüthgen, 1931)
- Lasioglossum submeracum (Cockerell, 1930)
- Lasioglossum submetallicum (Benoist, 1944)
- Lasioglossum submoratum (Cockerell, 1930)
- Lasioglossum subobscurum (Cockerell, 1895)
- Lasioglossum subopacum (Smith, 1853)
- Lasioglossum subplebeium (Cockerell, 1930)
- Lasioglossum subpurpureum (Cockerell, 1919)
- Lasioglossum subrubsectum Fan & Ebmer, 1992
- Lasioglossum subrussatum (Cockerell, 1922)
- Lasioglossum subsemilucens (Blüthgen, 1934)
- Lasioglossum subsphecodes (Pauly, 1986)
- Lasioglossum subterminale (Cockerell, 1941)
- Lasioglossum subtropicum Sakagami, Miyanaga & Maeta, 1994
- Lasioglossum subversans (Mitchell, 1960)
- Lasioglossum subversicolum Fan & Ebmer, 1992
- Lasioglossum subviridatum (Cockerell, 1938)
- Lasioglossum succinipenne (Ellis, 1913)
- Lasioglossum sudum (Vachal, 1904)
- Lasioglossum suisharyonense (Strand, 1914)
- Lasioglossum sulcatulum (Cockerell, 1925)
- Lasioglossum sulthicum (Smith, 1853)
- Lasioglossum suppressum Ebmer, 1983
- Lasioglossum supraclypeatum (Mitchell, 1960)
- Lasioglossum supralucens (Cockerell, 1916)
- Lasioglossum supranitens (Cockerell, 1919)
- Lasioglossum surianae (Mitchell, 1960)
- Lasioglossum surrubresense (Strand, 1921)
- Lasioglossum sutepellum (Cockerell, 1937)
- Lasioglossum sutepinum (Cockerell, 1937)
- Lasioglossum sutshanicum Pesenko, 1986
- Lasioglossum swenki (Crawford, 1906)
- Lasioglossum swezeyi (Cockerell, 1939)
- Lasioglossum synavei (Pauly, 1984)
- Lasioglossum synthyridis (Crawford, 1906)
- Lasioglossum szentivanyi (Michener, 1960)

=== T ===
- Lasioglossum taclobanense (Cockerell, 1915)
- Lasioglossum tadschicum (Blüthgen, 1929)
- Lasioglossum taeniolellum (Vachal, 1903)
- Lasioglossum tahitense (Mitchell, 1960)
- Lasioglossum taihorine (Strand, 1914)
- Lasioglossum talchium (Smith, 1853)
- Lasioglossum taluchis (Smith, 1853)
- Lasioglossum talyschense (Blüthgen, 1924)
- Lasioglossum tamburinei (Friese, 1917)
- Lasioglossum tamiamense (Mitchell, 1960)
- Lasioglossum tamulicum (Blüthgen, 1926)
- Lasioglossum tanganum (Cockerell, 1939)
- Lasioglossum taninense (Warncke, 1984)
- Lasioglossum tannaense (Cockerell, 1916)
- Lasioglossum tardum (Cameron, 1897)
- Lasioglossum tarponense (Mitchell, 1960)
- Lasioglossum tarsatum (Schenck, 1870)
- Lasioglossum tasmaniae (Cockerell, 1905)
- Lasioglossum tatei (Cockerell, 1910)
- Lasioglossum tauricum Ebmer, 1972
- Lasioglossum tegulare (Robertson, 1890)
- Lasioglossum tegulariforme (Crawford, 1907)
- Lasioglossum teltiri Walker, 1995
- Lasioglossum tenasserimicum (Blüthgen, 1926)
- Lasioglossum tenax (Sandhouse, 1924)
- Lasioglossum tenkeanum (Cockerell, 1937)
- Lasioglossum tenue (Ellis, 1913)
- Lasioglossum tenuicorne (Cockerell, 1946)
- Lasioglossum tenuilingue (Cockerell, 1937)
- Lasioglossum tenuivene (Cockerell, 1946)
- Lasioglossum tepperi (Cockerell, 1905)
- Lasioglossum terginum (Vachal, 1904)
- Lasioglossum tertium (Dalla Torre, 1896)
- Lasioglossum tessaranotatum Ebmer, 1998
- Lasioglossum testaceipes (Friese, 1914)
- Lasioglossum testaceum (Robertson, 1897)
- Lasioglossum testaciventre (Rayment, 1953)
- Lasioglossum texanum (Cresson, 1872)
- Lasioglossum textorium (Benoist, 1957)
- Lasioglossum theodori (Crawford, 1902)
- Lasioglossum theste (Cameron, 1905)
- Lasioglossum thomasseti (Cockerell, 1937)
- Lasioglossum thor (Cockerell, 1929)
- Lasioglossum tilachiforme (Cockerell, 1907)
- Lasioglossum tilachum (Smith, 1853)
- Lasioglossum timberlakei McGinley, 1986
- Lasioglossum tinguiricum (Holmberg, 1886)
- Lasioglossum tinnunculum (Warncke, 1982)
- Lasioglossum titusi (Crawford, 1902)
- Lasioglossum tonganum (Perkins & Cheesman, 1928)
- Lasioglossum tooloomense (Cockerell, 1929)
- Lasioglossum torulosum (Michener, 1980)
- Lasioglossum toxopei (Alfken, 1926)
- Lasioglossum tracyi (Cockerell, 1936)
- Lasioglossum tranquillum (Sandhouse, 1924)
- Lasioglossum transitorium (Schenck, 1868)
- Lasioglossum transpositum (Cockerell, 1925)
- Lasioglossum transvaalense (Cameron & Cockerell, 1937)
- Lasioglossum transvorsum (Vachal, 1904)
- Lasioglossum travassosi (Moure, 1940)
- Lasioglossum triangulatum Walker, 1995
- Lasioglossum trianguliferum (Cockerell, 1941)
- Lasioglossum triangulinum (Cockerell, 1946)
- Lasioglossum tribuarium (Rayment, 1935)
- Lasioglossum trichardti (Cockerell, 1939)
- Lasioglossum trichiosulum (Strand, 1914)
- Lasioglossum trichopygum (Blüthgen, 1923)
- Lasioglossum trichorhinum (Cockerell, 1925)
- Lasioglossum tricinctum (Schenck, 1874)
- Lasioglossum tricnicos (Vachal, 1904)
- Lasioglossum tricolor (Michener, 1965)
- Lasioglossum tridens Walker, 1995
- Lasioglossum trigoniformis (Pauly, 1986)
- Lasioglossum trincomalicum (Cameron, 1903)
- Lasioglossum trinidadense (Friese, 1909)
- Lasioglossum tripunctatum (Cockerell, 1929)
- Lasioglossum triste (Vachal, 1895)
- Lasioglossum trizonatum (Cresson, 1874)
- Lasioglossum tropicior (Ellis, 1914)
- Lasioglossum tropidonotum McGinley, 1986
- Lasioglossum truncaticolle (Morawitz, 1877)
- Lasioglossum truncatum (Robertson, 1901)
- Lasioglossum tschakarense (Blüthgen, 1925)
- Lasioglossum tschardschuicum (Blüthgen, 1931)
- Lasioglossum tschibuklinum (Blüthgen, 1931)
- Lasioglossum tschulicum (Blüthgen, 1931)
- Lasioglossum tuchilas (Smith, 1853)
- Lasioglossum tunguense (Blüthgen, 1926)
- Lasioglossum tungusicum Ebmer, 1978
- Lasioglossum tuolumnense Gibbs, 2009
- Lasioglossum turneri (Cockerell, 1914)
- Lasioglossum turneri (Blüthgen, 1926)
- Lasioglossum tyndarus Ebmer, 2002

=== U-V ===
- Lasioglossum uelleburgense (Strand, 1912)
- Lasioglossum ufiomicum (Cockerell, 1945)
- Lasioglossum ugandicum (Cockerell, 1937)
- Lasioglossum ultimum (Cockerell, 1929)
- Lasioglossum umbone (Michener, 1980)
- Lasioglossum umbripenne (Ellis, 1913)
- Lasioglossum uncinatum Walker, 1995
- Lasioglossum unicum (Sandhouse, 1924)
- Lasioglossum upinense (Morawitz, 1890)
- Lasioglossum upoluense (Perkins & Cheesman, 1928)
- Lasioglossum urbanum (Smith, 1879)
- Lasioglossum urbanum Gonzalez, 2006
- Lasioglossum urenae Pauly, 2001
- Lasioglossum urguticum Ebmer, 1972
- Lasioglossum uvirense (Cockerell, 1937)
- Lasioglossum uyacicola (Cockerell, 1949)
- Lasioglossum vagans (Smith, 1857)
- Lasioglossum vaporellum (Cockerell, 1910)
- Lasioglossum vau (Cockerell, 1910)
- Lasioglossum vechti (Pauly, 1980)
- Lasioglossum veganum (Cockerell, 1901)
- Lasioglossum verae Pesenko, 1986
- Lasioglossum verapaz Engel, Hinojosa-Díaz & Yáñez-Ordóñez, 2007
- Lasioglossum vergilianum (Pérez, 1903)
- Lasioglossum vermiculatum (Cockerell, 1914)
- Lasioglossum veronicae (Cockerell, 1926)
- Lasioglossum versans (Lovell, 1905)
- Lasioglossum versatum (Robertson, 1902)
- Lasioglossum versicolum Fan & Ebmer, 1992
- Lasioglossum versifrons (Perkins & Cheesman, 1928)
- Lasioglossum verticulum (Walker, 1997)
- Lasioglossum vexator (Krombein, 1950)
- Lasioglossum victoriae (Cockerell, 1926)
- Lasioglossum victoriellum (Cockerell, 1914)
- Lasioglossum vierecki (Crawford, 1904)
- Lasioglossum villosulum (Kirby, 1802)
- Lasioglossum virens (Erichson, 1835)
- Lasioglossum viridatulum (Cockerell, 1919)
- Lasioglossum viridatum (Lovell, 1905)
- Lasioglossum viride (Brullé, 1840)
- Lasioglossum virideglaucum Ebmer & Sakagami, 1994
- Lasioglossum viridellum (Cockerell, 1931)
- Lasioglossum viriderostratum Ebmer, 1978
- Lasioglossum viridiscitum (Cockerell, 1911)
- Lasioglossum vitripenne (Smith, 1879)
- Lasioglossum vulcanicum (Blüthgen, 1928)
- Lasioglossum vulneratum (Cockerell, 1910)
- Lasioglossum vulsum (Vachal, 1903)

=== W-Z ===
- Lasioglossum warburtoni (Cockerell, 1906)
- Lasioglossum waterhousei (Cockerell, 1915)
- Lasioglossum wauense (Pauly, 1986)
- Lasioglossum weemsi (Mitchell, 1960)
- Lasioglossum wellingtoni (Cockerell, 1914)
- Lasioglossum wheeleri (Mitchell, 1960)
- Lasioglossum whiteanum (Cameron, 1905)
- Lasioglossum wilkinsoni (Cockerell, 1945)
- Lasioglossum willsi (Cockerell, 1906)
- Lasioglossum wilmattae (Cockerell, 1929)
- Lasioglossum wilsoni (Cheesman & Perkins, 1939)
- Lasioglossum windhukense (Friese, 1916)
- Lasioglossum wollastoni (Cockerell, 1922)
- Lasioglossum woodsi (Cockerell, 1910)
- Lasioglossum xanthopoides (Friese, 1925)
- Lasioglossum xanthopus (Kirby, 1802)
- Lasioglossum xerophilinum (Cockerell, 1945)
- Lasioglossum xerophilum Walker, 1995
- Lasioglossum xizangense Fan & Ebmer, 1992
- Lasioglossum xyriotropis McGinley, 1986
- Lasioglossum xystodorsum Ebmer, 1998
- Lasioglossum xystonotum (Vachal, 1895)
- Lasioglossum yakourense (Saunders, 1908)
- Lasioglossum yakuticum Pesenko & Davydova, 2004
- Lasioglossum yamanei Murao, Ebmer & Tadauchi, 2006
- Lasioglossum yapense (Cockerell, 1939)
- Lasioglossum yolense (Cockerell, 1945)
- Lasioglossum ypirangense (Schrottky, 1910)
- Lasioglossum yucatanense Landaverde-González, 2023
- Lasioglossum zachlorum (Cockerell, 1929)
- Lasioglossum zamelanum (Cockerell, 1930)
- Lasioglossum zamoranicum (Cockerell, 1949)
- Lasioglossum zanzibaricum (Cockerell, 1945)
- Lasioglossum zephyrus (Smith, 1853)
- Lasioglossum zeyanense Pesenko, 1986
- Lasioglossum zimbabwicum (Cockerell, 1937)
- Lasioglossum zingowli (Cheesman & Perkins, 1939)
- Lasioglossum zipangu Ebmer & Sakagami, 1994
- Lasioglossum zonaturum (Cockerell, 1945)
- Lasioglossum zonulus (Smith, 1848)
- Lasioglossum zophops (Ellis, 1914)
- Lasioglossum zostaceum (Warncke, 1982)
- Lasioglossum zunaga Sakagami & Tadauchi, 1995
