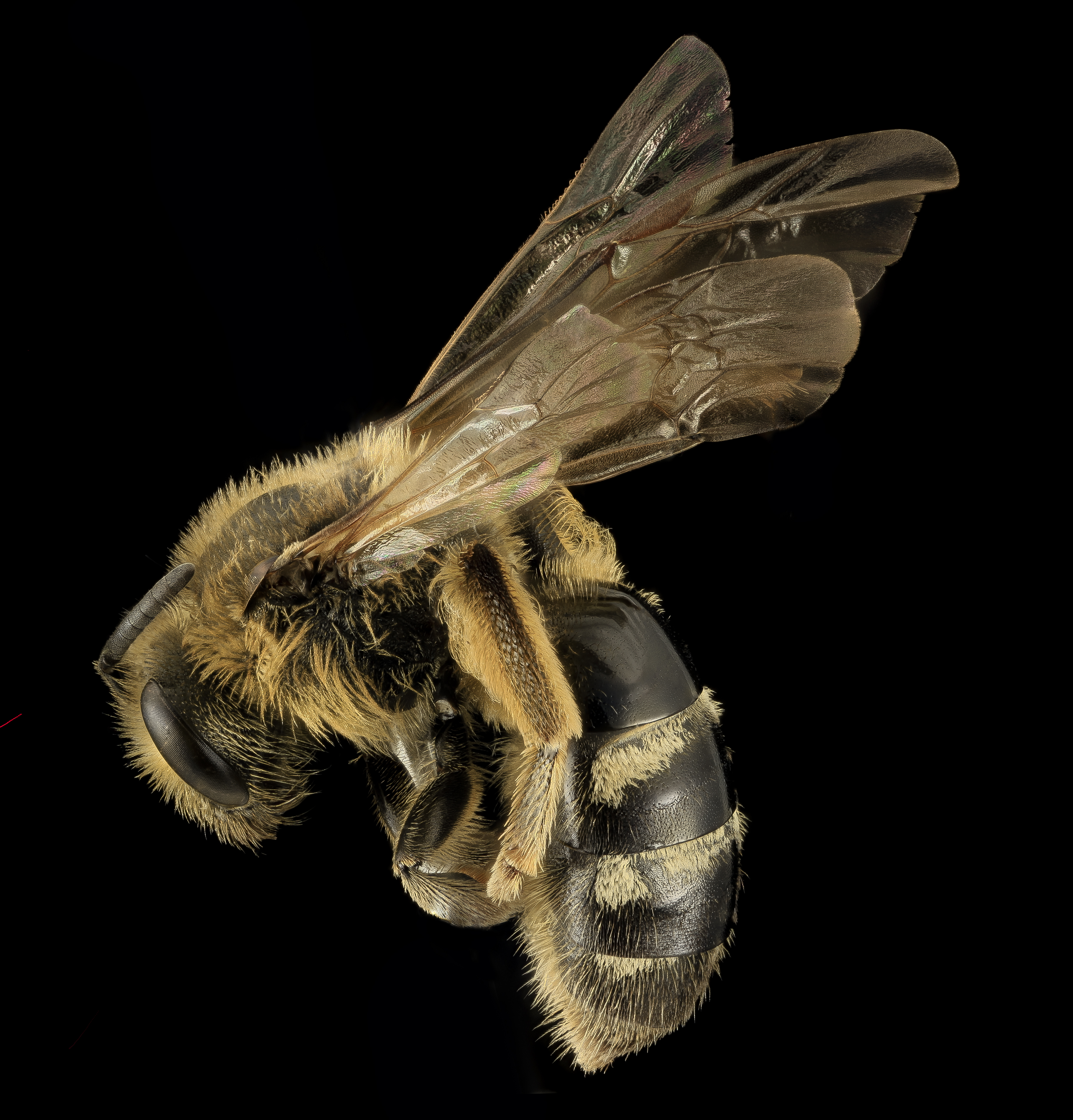

Scientific classification
- Domain: Eukaryota
- Kingdom: Animalia
- Phylum: Arthropoda
- Class: Insecta
- Order: Hymenoptera
- Family: Halictidae
- Tribe: Halictini
- Genus: Lasioglossum
- Species: L. pacificum

Binomial name
- Lasioglossum pacificum (Cockerell, 1898)

= Lasioglossum pacificum =

Species of bee

Lasioglossum pacificum is a species of sweat bee in the family Halictidae.
