= Lasioglossum dorchini =

Scientific classification
- Kingdom: Animalia
- Phylum: Arthropoda
- Clade: Pancrustacea
- Class: Insecta
- Order: Hymenoptera
- Family: Halictidae
- Genus: Lasioglossum
- Species: L. dorchini

Binomial name
- Lasioglossum dorchini Pauly, 2020

Species of bee

Lasioglossum dorchini is a species of bee in the genus Lasioglossum, in the family Halictidae. It is endemic to the coastal plains of Israel. It was described and named by Alain Pauly in 2020, a taxonomist from the Royal Belgian Institute of Natural Sciences in Brussels.

== Nomenclature ==
The species was named Lasioglossum dorchini in tribute to the Israeli bee researcher Achik Dorchin of the Steinhardt Museum of Natural History at Tel Aviv University.
