= Lasioglossum tuolumnense =

Scientific classification
- Domain: Eukaryota
- Kingdom: Animalia
- Phylum: Arthropoda
- Class: Insecta
- Order: Hymenoptera
- Family: Halictidae
- Tribe: Halictini
- Genus: Lasioglossum
- Species: L. tuolumnense

Binomial name
- Lasioglossum tuolumnense Gibbs, 2009

Species of bee

Lasioglossum tuolumnense is a species of sweat bee in the family Halictidae.
