= Lasioglossum singhalense =

Scientific classification
- Kingdom: Animalia
- Phylum: Arthropoda
- Clade: Pancrustacea
- Class: Insecta
- Order: Hymenoptera
- Family: Halictidae
- Genus: Lasioglossum
- Species: L. singhalense

Binomial name
- Lasioglossum singhalense (Blüthgen, 1926)

Synonyms
- Halictus singhalensis Blüthgen, 1926; Homalictus singhalensis (Blüthgen, 1926)

Species of bee

Lasioglossum singhalense is a species of bee in the genus Lasioglossum of the family Halictidae.
