= Lasioglossum pectoraloides =

Scientific classification
- Kingdom: Animalia
- Phylum: Arthropoda
- Class: Insecta
- Order: Hymenoptera
- Family: Halictidae
- Tribe: Halictini
- Genus: Lasioglossum
- Species: L. pectoraloides

Binomial name
- Lasioglossum pectoraloides (Cockerell, 1895)

Species of bee

Lasioglossum pectoraloides is a species of sweat bee in the family Halictidae.
