= Lasioglossum albipenne =

Scientific classification
- Domain: Eukaryota
- Kingdom: Animalia
- Phylum: Arthropoda
- Class: Insecta
- Order: Hymenoptera
- Family: Halictidae
- Tribe: Halictini
- Genus: Lasioglossum
- Species: L. albipenne

Binomial name
- Lasioglossum albipenne (Robertson, 1890)

Species of bee

Lasioglossum albipenne, the white-winged metallic-sweat bee, is a species of sweat bee in the family Halictidae.
