= Lasioglossum lactescens =

Scientific classification
- Kingdom: Animalia
- Phylum: Arthropoda
- Clade: Pancrustacea
- Class: Insecta
- Order: Hymenoptera
- Family: Halictidae
- Genus: Lasioglossum
- Species: L. lactescens

Binomial name
- Lasioglossum lactescens (Cockerell, 1937)

Synonyms
- Evylaeus lactescens (Cockerell); Halictus lactescens Cockerell, 1937

Species of bee

Lasioglossum lactescens is a species of sweat bee, in the family Halictidae, endemic to Africa. The species was first described by American entomologist Theodore Dru Alison Cockerell in 1937. No subspecies are assigned.
