= Lasioglossum coreopsis =

Scientific classification
- Domain: Eukaryota
- Kingdom: Animalia
- Phylum: Arthropoda
- Class: Insecta
- Order: Hymenoptera
- Family: Halictidae
- Tribe: Halictini
- Genus: Lasioglossum
- Species: L. coreopsis

Binomial name
- Lasioglossum coreopsis (Robertson, 1902)

Species of bee

Lasioglossum coreopsis is a species of sweat bee in the family Halictidae.
