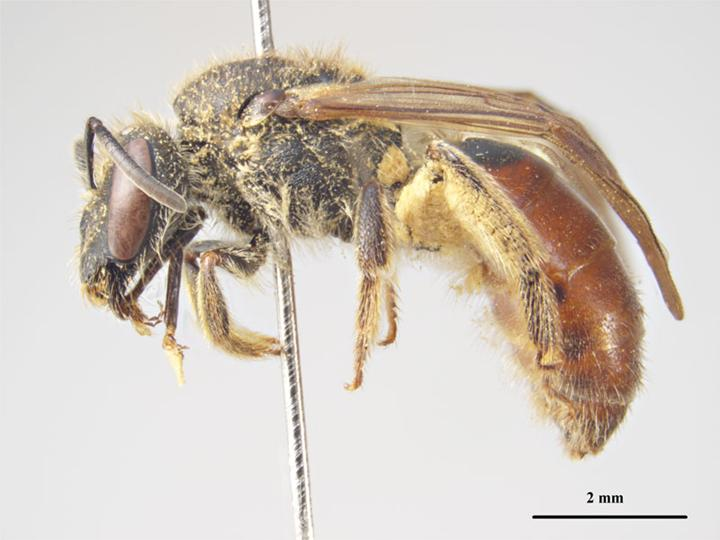
- Female

Scientific classification
- Kingdom: Animalia
- Phylum: Arthropoda
- Clade: Pancrustacea
- Class: Insecta
- Order: Hymenoptera
- Family: Halictidae
- Genus: Lasioglossum
- Species: L. melbournense

Binomial name
- Lasioglossum melbournense (Cockerell, 1904)

Synonyms
- Parasphecodes melbournensis Cockerell, 1904; Parasphecodes microdontus Cockerell, 1912; Parasphecodes recantans Cockerell, 1912; Parasphecodes recessus Cockerell, 1914; Parasphecodes rufotegularis Cockerell, 1914; Parasphecodes latissimus Cockerell, 1915; Parasphecodes annexus Cockerell, 1922; Parasphecodes longmani Cockerell, 1922

= Lasioglossum melbournense =

Species of bee

Lasioglossum melbournense, or Lasioglossum (Parasphecodes) melbournense, is a species of bee in the family Halictidae and subfamily Halictinae. It is endemic to Australia. It was described by British-American entomologist Theodore Dru Alison Cockerell in 1904.

== Description ==
Female body length is about 11 mm. Integumental colouration is mainly black; the abdomen is bright red.

== Distribution and habitat ==
The species occurs in south-eastern Australia. Type localities include Melbourne in Victoria.

== Behaviour ==
The adults are flying mellivores. Flowering plants visited by the bees include Acacia, Eucalyptus, Leptospermum and Melaleuca species.

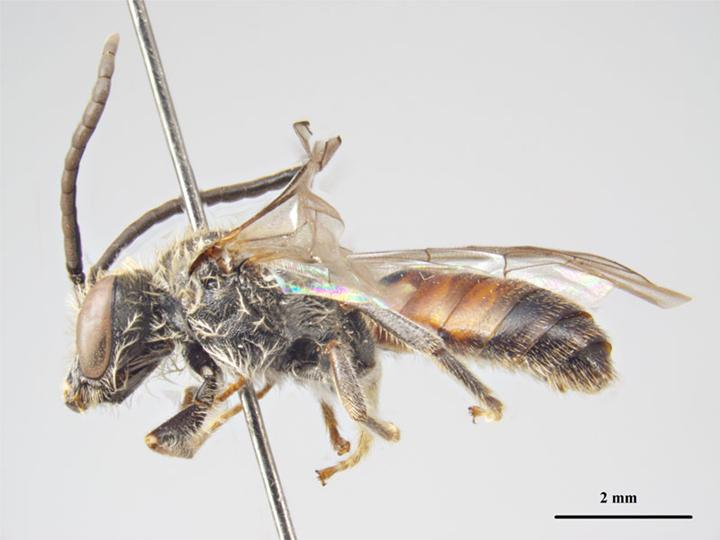
Male
