= Lasioglossum familiare =

Scientific classification
- Kingdom: Animalia
- Phylum: Arthropoda
- Clade: Pancrustacea
- Class: Insecta
- Order: Hymenoptera
- Family: Halictidae
- Genus: Lasioglossum
- Species: L. familiare

Binomial name
- Lasioglossum familiare (Erichson, 1842)

Synonyms
- Hylaeus familiaris Erichson, 1842

Species of bee

Lasioglossum familiare, or Lasioglossum (Chilalictus) familiare, is a species of bee in the family Halictidae and subfamily Halictinae. It is endemic to Australia . It was described by German entomologist Wilhelm Ferdinand Erichson in 1842.

== Distribution and habitat ==
The species occurs in Tasmania.

== Behaviour ==
The adults are flying mellivores.
