= Lasioglossum olympiae =

Scientific classification
- Kingdom: Animalia
- Phylum: Arthropoda
- Clade: Pancrustacea
- Class: Insecta
- Order: Hymenoptera
- Family: Halictidae
- Genus: Lasioglossum
- Species: L. olympiae

Binomial name
- Lasioglossum olympiae (Cockerell, 1898)

Species of bee

Lasioglossum olympiae is a species of sweat bee in the family Halictidae.
