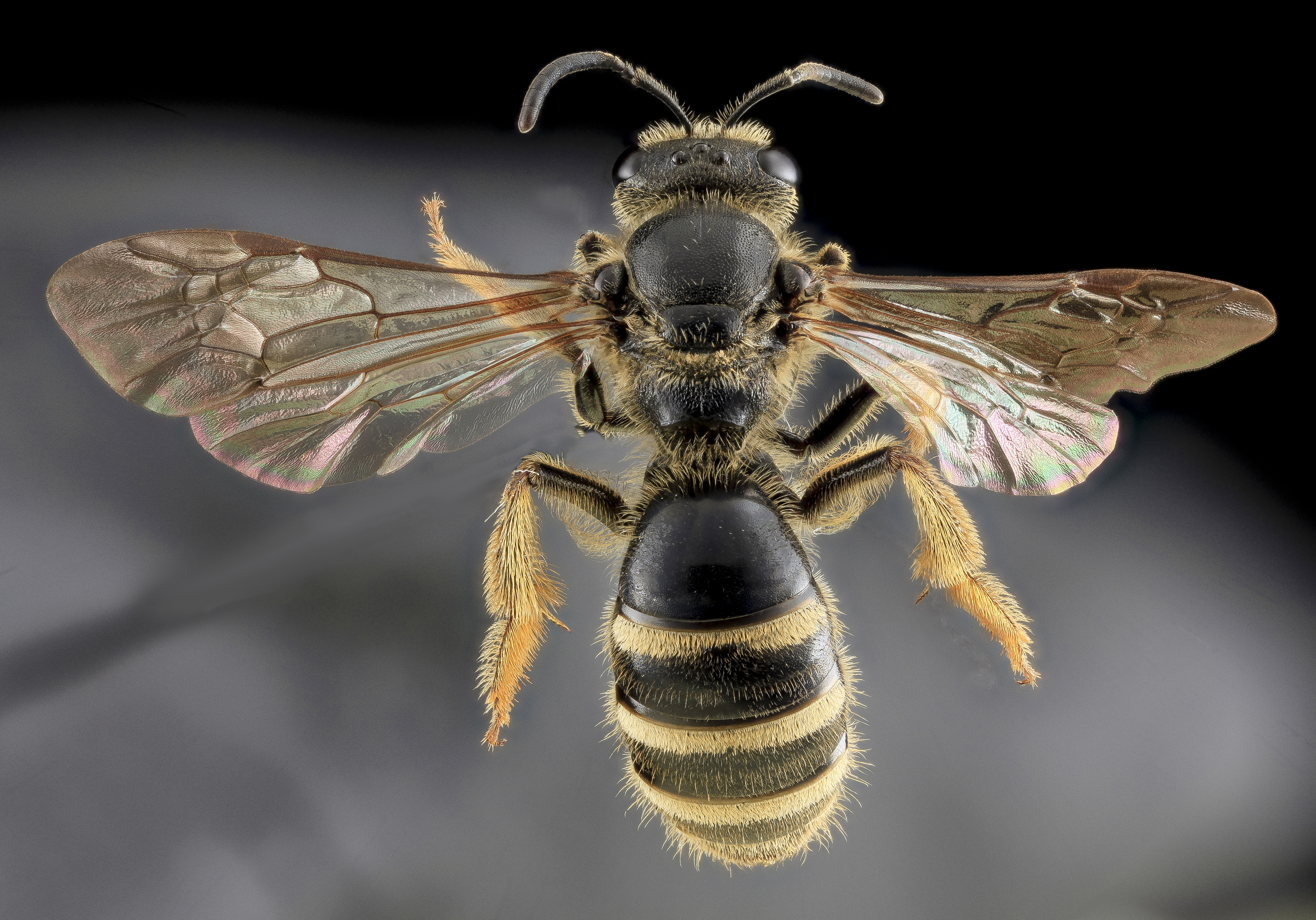

Scientific classification
- Kingdom: Animalia
- Phylum: Arthropoda
- Class: Insecta
- Order: Hymenoptera
- Family: Halictidae
- Tribe: Halictini
- Genus: Lasioglossum
- Species: L. fuscipenne

Binomial name
- Lasioglossum fuscipenne (Smith, 1853)

= Lasioglossum fuscipenne =

Species of bee

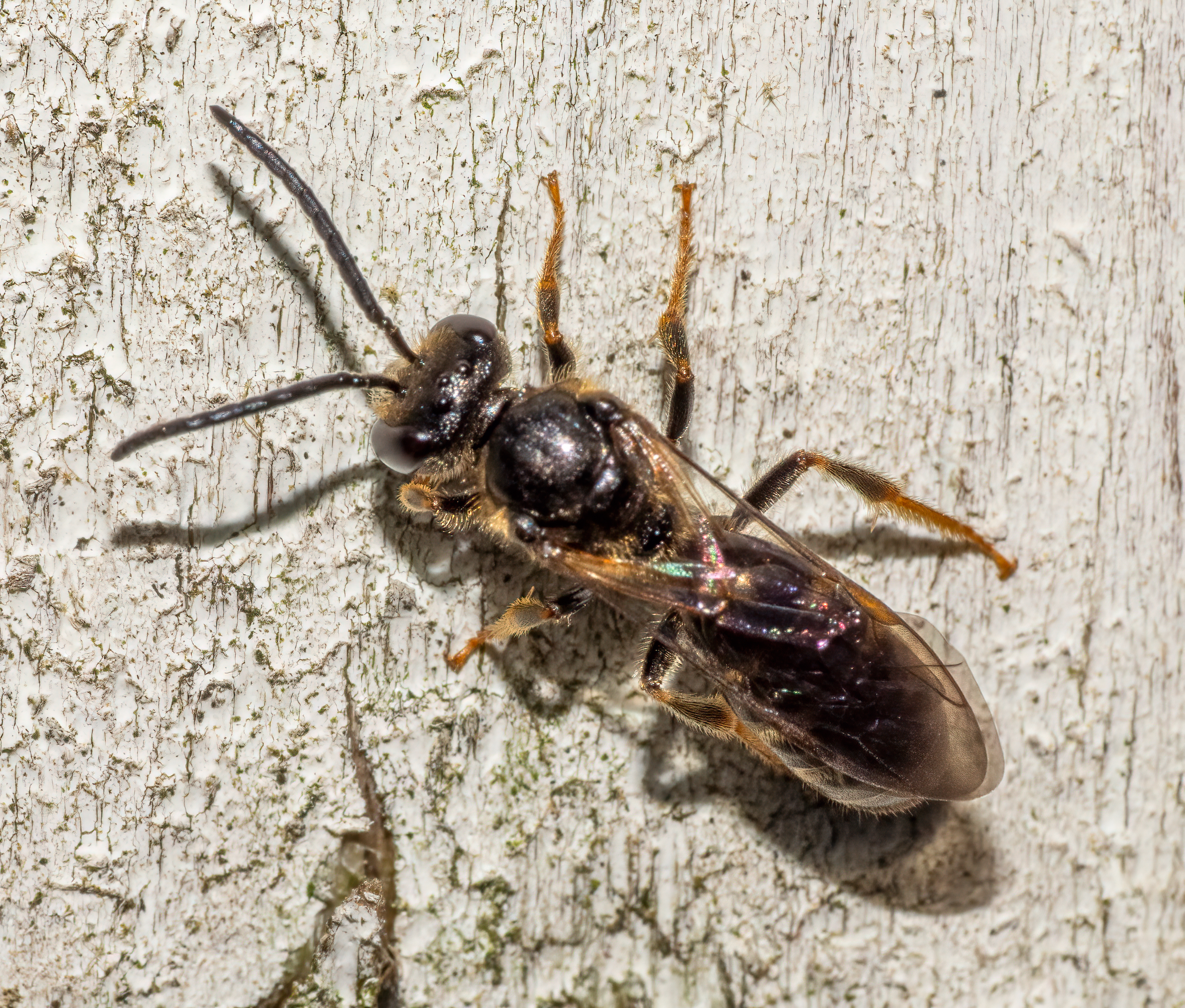
L. fuscipenne in New York

Lasioglossum fuscipenne is a species of sweat bee in the family Halictidae.
