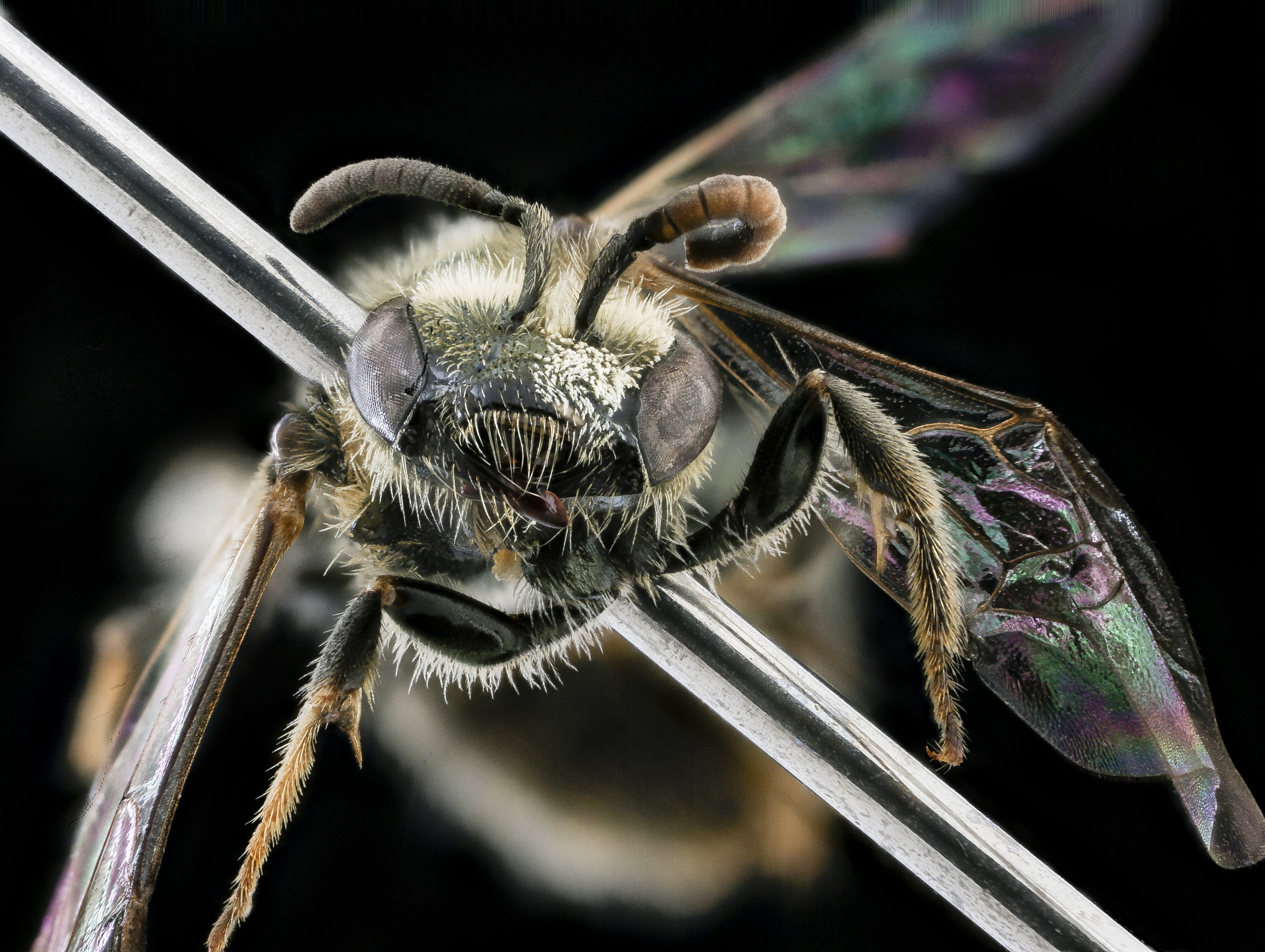

Scientific classification
- Kingdom: Animalia
- Phylum: Arthropoda
- Clade: Pancrustacea
- Class: Insecta
- Order: Hymenoptera
- Family: Halictidae
- Genus: Lasioglossum
- Species: L. pilosum

Binomial name
- Lasioglossum pilosum (Smith, 1853)

= Lasioglossum pilosum =

Species of bee

Lasioglossum pilosum is a species of sweat bees in the family Halictidae. The species is a generalist and known to pollinate flowers as well as commercial fruits like apples. It is sometimes known to cause a slightly irritating sting, mild in comparison to most other stinging bee species.
