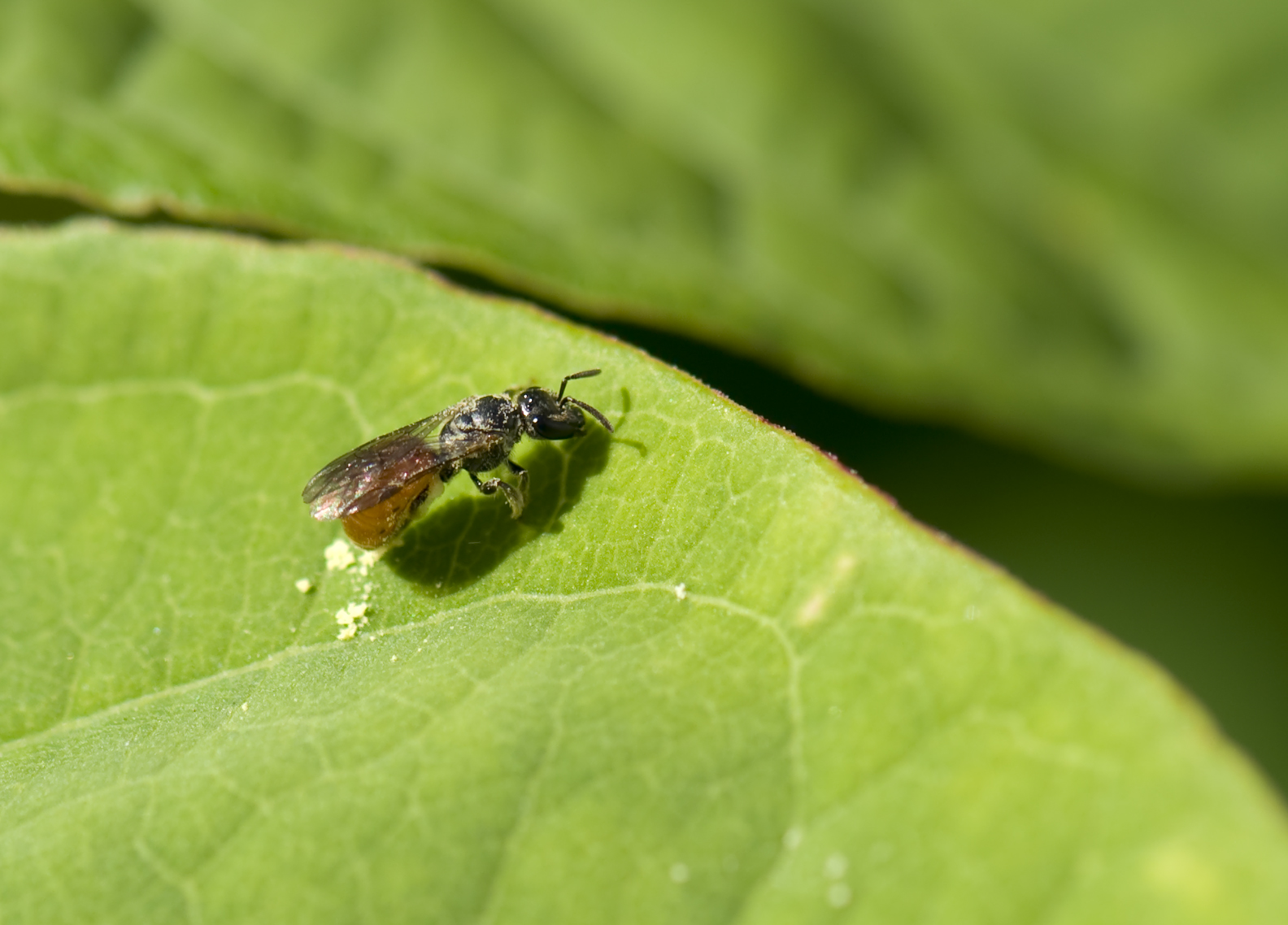

Scientific classification
- Kingdom: Animalia
- Phylum: Arthropoda
- Class: Insecta
- Order: Hymenoptera
- Family: Halictidae
- Genus: Lasioglossum
- Species: L. ovaliceps

Binomial name
- Lasioglossum ovaliceps (Cockerell, 1898)

= Lasioglossum ovaliceps =

Species of bee

Lasioglossum ovaliceps is a species of sweat bee in the family Halictidae.
