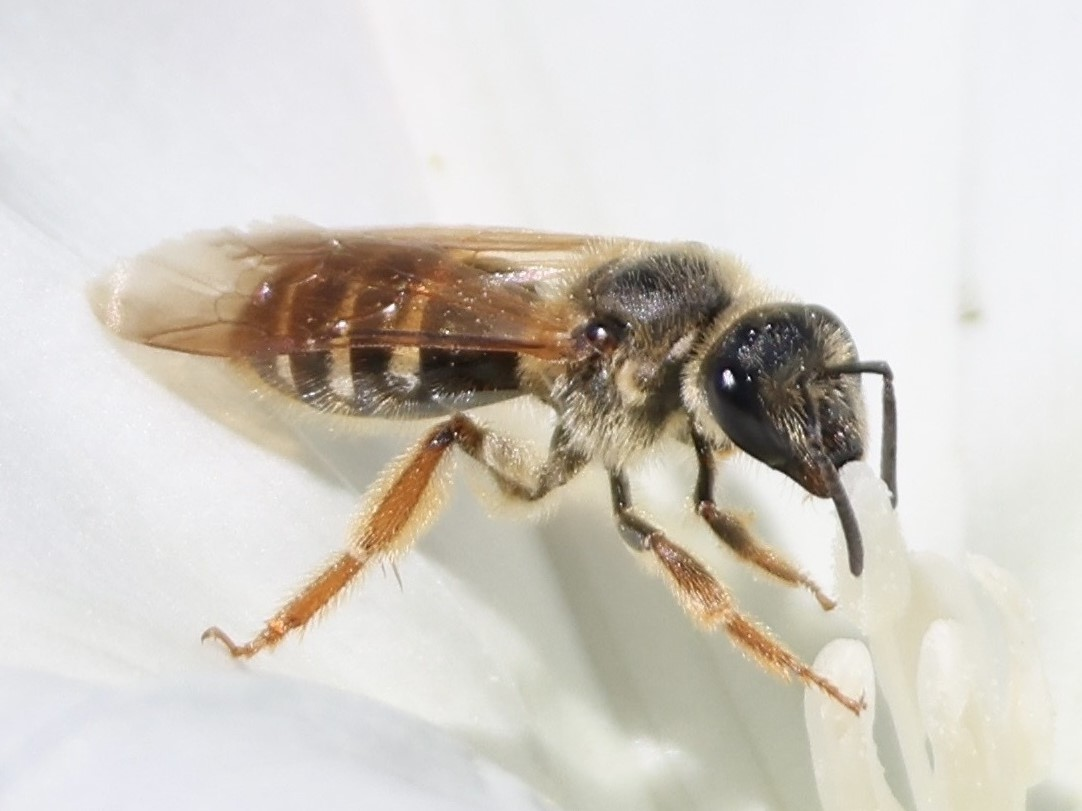

Scientific classification
- Kingdom: Animalia
- Phylum: Arthropoda
- Class: Insecta
- Order: Hymenoptera
- Family: Halictidae
- Tribe: Halictini
- Genus: Lasioglossum
- Species: L. mellipes

Binomial name
- Lasioglossum mellipes (Crawford, 1907)

= Lasioglossum mellipes =

Species of bee

Lasioglossum mellipes is a species of sweat bee in the family Halictidae.
