= Lasioglossum petrellum =

Scientific classification
- Kingdom: Animalia
- Phylum: Arthropoda
- Class: Insecta
- Order: Hymenoptera
- Family: Halictidae
- Genus: Lasioglossum
- Species: L. petrellum

Binomial name
- Lasioglossum petrellum (Cockerell, 1903)

Species of bee

Lasioglossum petrellum is a species of sweat bee in the family Halictidae.
