= Lasioglossum semisculptum =

Scientific classification
- Kingdom: Animalia
- Phylum: Arthropoda
- Class: Insecta
- Order: Hymenoptera
- Family: Halictidae
- Genus: Lasioglossum
- Species: L. semisculptum

Binomial name
- Lasioglossum semisculptum (Cockerell, 1911)

Species of bee

Lasioglossum semisculptum, also known as the Lasioglossum (Ctenomia) semisculptum, is a species of bee in the genus Lasioglossum, of the family Halictidae. Lasioglossum semisculptum exhibits a high degree of social diversity, ranging from solitary to eusocial behaviors. These bees are important pollinators for a variety of wildflowers and crops, contributing significantly to the biodiversity and health of ecosystems.
