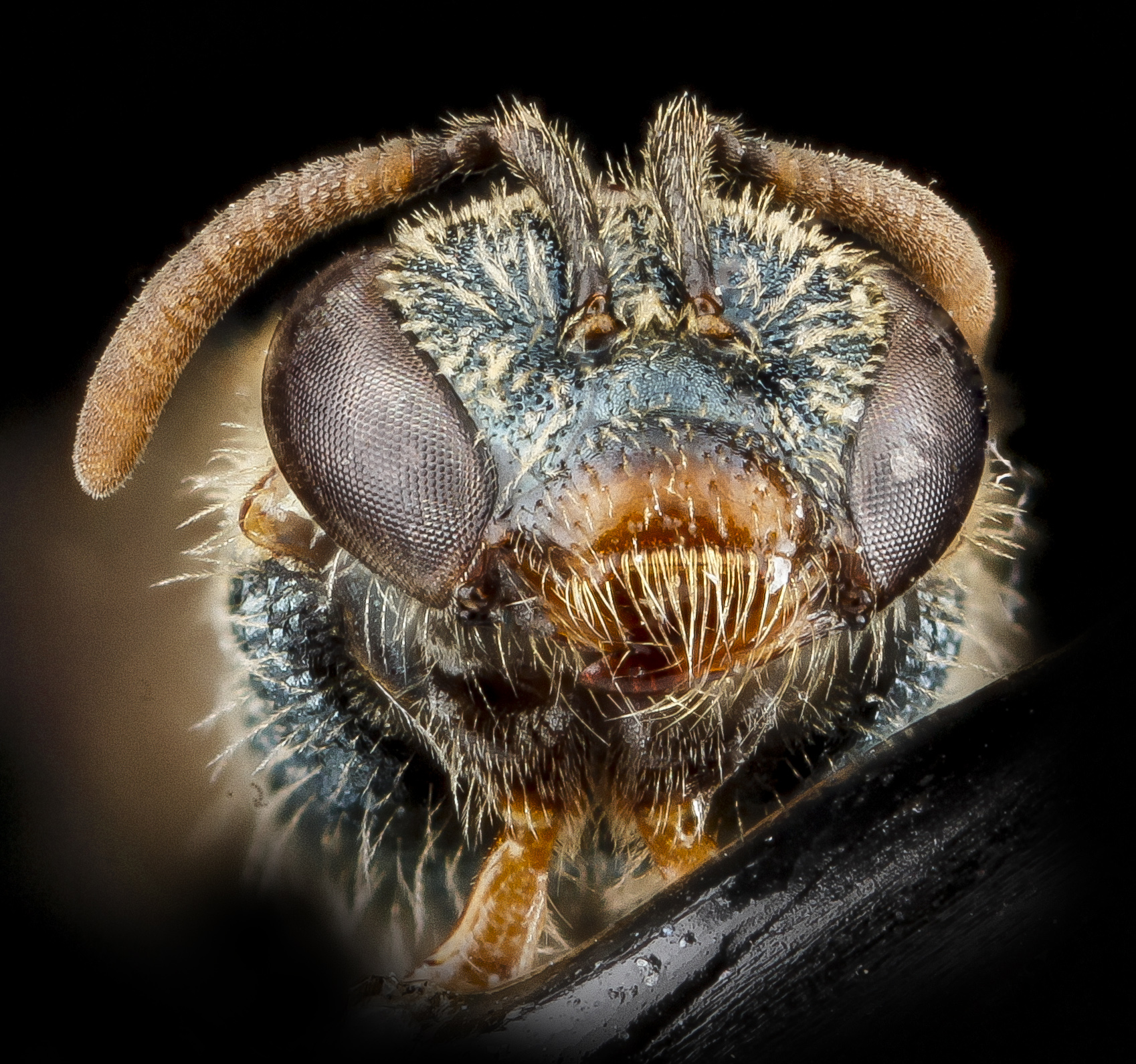

Scientific classification
- Domain: Eukaryota
- Kingdom: Animalia
- Phylum: Arthropoda
- Class: Insecta
- Order: Hymenoptera
- Family: Halictidae
- Tribe: Halictini
- Genus: Lasioglossum
- Species: L. tarponense

Binomial name
- Lasioglossum tarponense (Mitchell, 1960)

= Lasioglossum tarponense =

Species of bee

Lasioglossum tarponense is a species of sweat bee in the family Halictidae.
