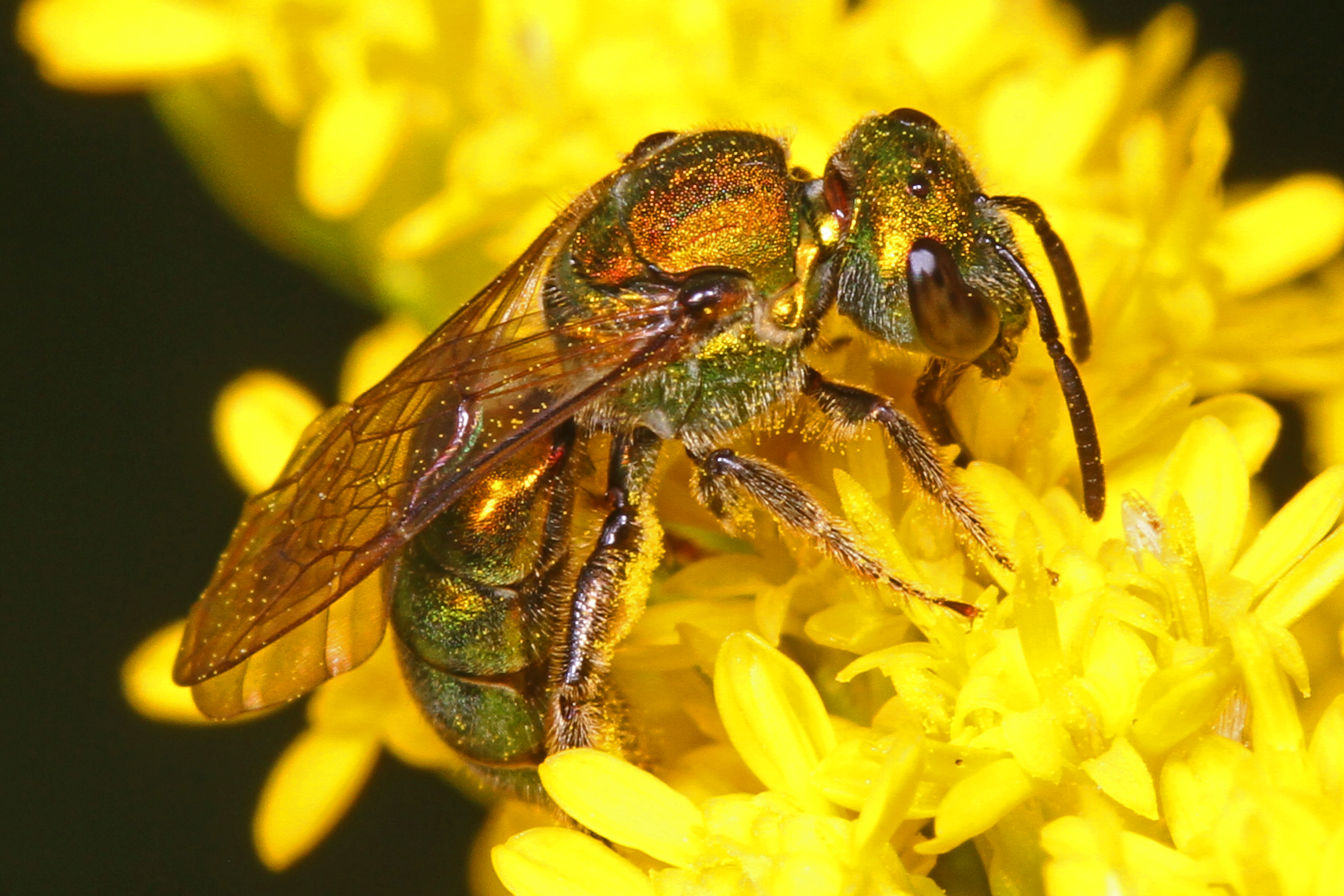

Scientific classification
- Kingdom: Animalia
- Phylum: Arthropoda
- Clade: Pancrustacea
- Class: Insecta
- Order: Hymenoptera
- Family: Halictidae
- Subfamily: Halictinae
- Tribe: Augochlorini; Cockerell, 1897

Genera
- See text

= Augochlorini =

Tribe of bees

Augochlorini is a tribe of sweat bees in the subfamily Halictinae. They are found in the Nearctic and Neotropic realms. They typically display metallic coloration, with many species that are red, gold, green, blue, or purple.

== Genera ==
- Andinaugochlora Eickwort, 1969
- Ariphanarthra Moure, 1951
- Augochlora Smith, 1853
- Augochlorella Sandhouse, 1937
- Augochlorodes Moure, 1958
- Augochloropsis Cockerell, 1897
- Caenaugochlora Michener, 1954
- Ceratalictus Moure, 1943
- Chlerogas Vachal, 1904
- Chlerogella Michener, 1954
- Chlerogelloides Engel, Brooks & Yanega, 1997
- Corynura Spinola, 1851
- Corynurella Eickwort, 1969
- Halictillus Moure, 1947
- Ischnomelissa Engel, 1997
- Megalopta Smith, 1853
- Megaloptidia Cockerell, 1900
- Megaloptilla Moure & Hurd, 1987
- Megommation Moure, 1943
- Micrommation Moure, 1969
- Neocorynura Schrottky, 1910
- Paracorynurella Gonçalves, 2010
- Paroxystoglossa Moure, 1941
- Pereirapis Moure, 1943
- Pseudaugochlora Michener, 1954
- Rhectomia Moure, 1947
- Rhinocorynura Schrottky, 1909
- Rhynchochlora Engel, 2007
- Temnosoma Smith, 1853
- Thectochlora Moure, 1940
- Xenochlora Engel, Brooks & Yanega, 1997
- †Oligochlora Engel, 1996
