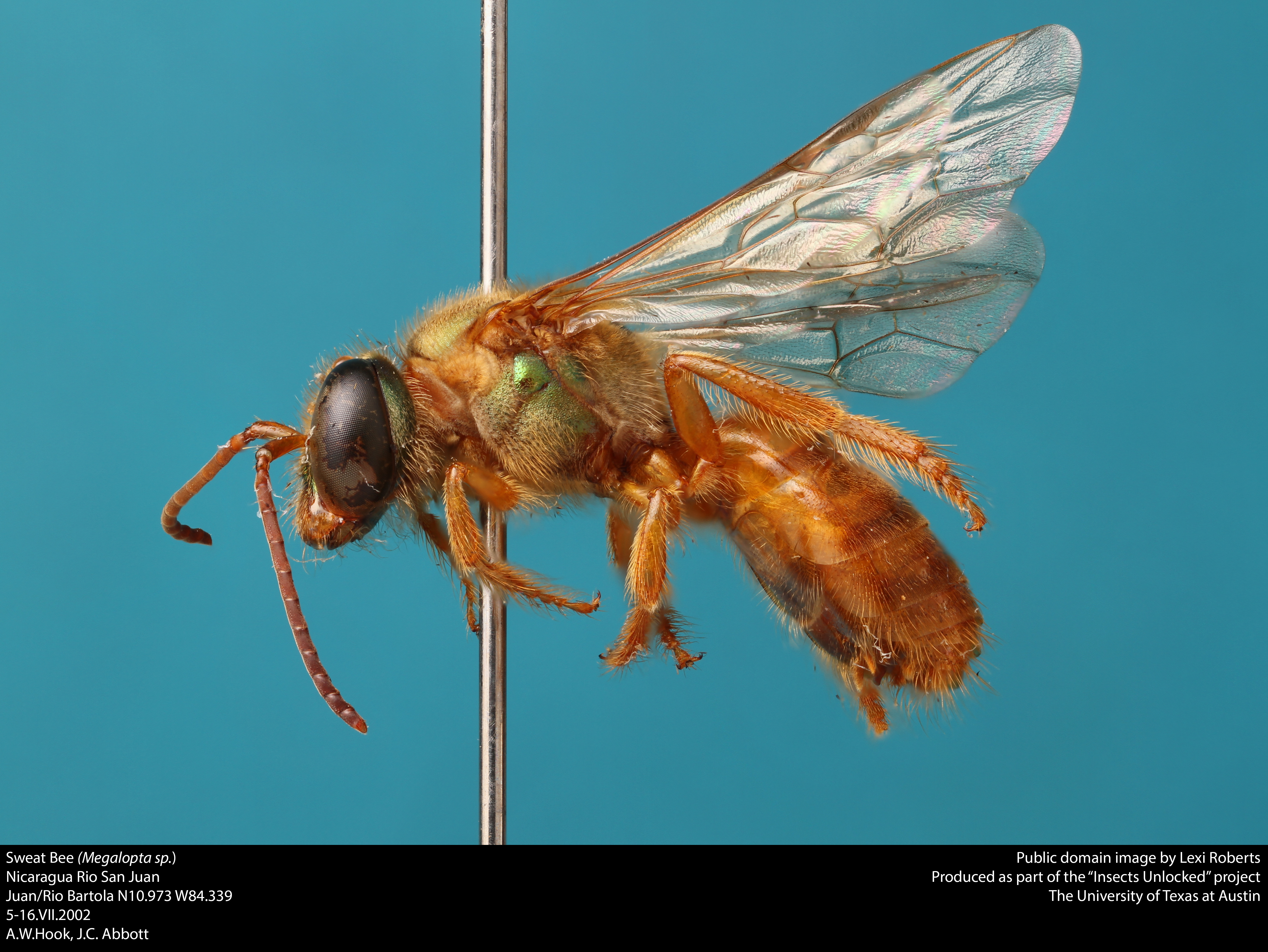

Scientific classification
- Kingdom: Animalia
- Phylum: Arthropoda
- Clade: Pancrustacea
- Class: Insecta
- Order: Hymenoptera
- Family: Halictidae
- Subfamily: Halictinae
- Genus: Megalopta; Smith, 1853

= Megalopta =

Genus of bees

Megalopta is a widespread neotropical genus of bees in the tribe Augochlorini in family Halictidae, known as the sweat bees. They are the largest of the five nocturnal genera in Augochlorini. Most have pale integumentary pigmentation, and all have large ocelli, most likely a feature of their nocturnal behavior. They live in tropical Central America and the entirety of South America. The subgenus Noctoraptor is cleptoparasitic. They are not known from the fossil record.

Megalopta was first described by Frederick Smith in 1853. The type species is Megalopta idalia, now known as Megalopta amoena. Most studies done on Megalopta are focused on M. genalis.

== General description ==
Megalopta are up to 2 cm long. They have large ocelli and compound eyes, used for nocturnal foraging. They have a yellow/brown abdomen with dark brown banding and metallic green/yellow to bronze thorax and head.

=== Nocturnal behavior and vision ===
All species of Megalopta are believed to be nocturnal or crepuscular. In general, Megalopta exhibit bimodal foraging patterns and are active for about 90 minutes after the sun sets and before the sun rises, regardless of food availability. Males and females are active at slightly different times and the females usually have higher overall rates of activity. This is hypothesized to be a niche shift to avoid competition from diurnal bees, or perhaps to avoid predation

Insects generally have a pair of compound eyes accompanied by a trio of single-lensed ocelli on the top of their head. While most nocturnal insects have superposition compound eyes, all hymenoptera have apposition eyes that are less sensitive to light than superposition eyes. Megalopta's apposition eyes are thirty times more sensitive to light than diurnal bees, but even this does not explain the accuracy of their vision. They may use their ocelli to supplement their night vision as well. Crepuscular bees have larger ocelli than diurnal bees, and nocturnal bees have the largest ocelli of all. Ocelli are not used for precise visual information, but can be used for other uses of visual information. Megalopta ocelli are highly adapted for sensitivity. They have large ocellar lenses and the percent area of the retina covered by the rhabdom is five times higher than diurnal bees. However, the adaptation to sensitivity most likely came at the cost of temporal resolution. One theory is they use neural spatial summation strategies to enhance their temporal resolution. Their rhabdom are elongated, with microvilli aligned in the same direction which potentially allows them to see the direction of polarized light. Megalopta ocelli have a dorsal rim, where the photoreceptors are sensitive to polarized light, such as from the rising or setting sun. Sunset and sunrise create unique polarized light patterns in the sky, and Megalopta may be using these light patterns to navigate. Despite having the superficial anatomy for polarized light directionality detection, the rhabdom are "worm-shaped" and arranged radially, which negates this ability. Meglopta also lack pigments in their ocelli that detect short-wavelength light, perhaps a result of their jungle habitat.

=== Nesting and the female hierarchy ===
Megalopta nest in dead branches, sticks, and vines. Their nests have a distinctive collar around the entrance made of chewed wood and consist of a large hollow tunnel and several cells. The internal cells are made of the same chewed wood as the entrance. Megalopta are facultatively eusocial. Their nests range from single female nests up to eleven female nests, but social nests usually contain 2-4 females. As the dry season progresses, single female nests gradually shift into multiple female nests, a result of females hatching and remaining in the nest. Usually, at least one female offspring stays in the nest and does not reproduce or grow ovaries. She instead maintains the nest and forages while the foundress continues to reproduce. Eusocial communities have an overlap of generations of nest-mates, meaning that two or more broods must be laid and hatch during the mating season. Eggs are usually laid during the dry season and hatch after 35 days. Eggs laid in a drier dry season usually produce numerically more, larger individuals that are involved in reproduction, as opposed to a comparatively wet dry season, which produces fewer, smaller workers. The association between reproduction and the dry season is likely a result of floral availability. The benefits of solitary versus eusocial lifestyles change with the seasons. In the dry season, eusocial lifestyles provide productivity benefits while in the wet season, the benefits are typically insurance-based.

In a multi-female hive, there is typically one dominant female and the rest are considered supernumerary. The dominant female usually is macrocephalic and the oldest female in the hive. The dominant female is analogous to the queen in honeybee hives, and can also be called the queen or the foundress. The supernumerary females fall into two roles: foragers and in-nest. The in-nest females generally stay in the nest and guard the entrance, as well as hygiene-oriented tasks. Halictinae are mass-provisional, meaning they cache the food necessary for larval growth before the eggs are laid and do not interact with larvae during development. However, experimentally, foundresses have displayed the ability to identify issues within a sealed cell. The foundresses opened the cell to assess the condition of the larvae and consequently either found something wrong, aborted the larvae, and reused the cell, or found nothing wrong and resealed the cell. The larvae in the resealed cells developed normally. Another parental behavior performed by foundresses is hygienic-based: the removal of faeces from cells that produced healthy adults. These deviations from mass-provisional behaviors are thought to be a precursor to eusociality.

=== Gynandromorphy ===
Gynandromorphy is the presence of both female and male characteristics in a single organism. Two species of Megalopta have exhibited gynandromorphy: Megalopta amoena and the heavily studied Megalopta genalis. Both specimens had a bilateral split with male characteristics on the left and female characteristics on the right. In comparison to male or female individuals who have bimodal foraging periods, the gynandromorph's activity was shifted significantly earlier in the day. This study was based on a single specimen and generalizations about gynandromorphy in Megalopta cannot be made. Furthermore, this mutation is extremely rare, with only two specimens having been found in the entire genus.

=== Interactions with other species ===
Macrosiagon gracilis is a parasite of M. genalis and M.ecuadoria. Megalopta have lower rates of brood parasitism than other solitary bees. Significant brood parasites include Lophostigma cincta, a mutilid wasp, and cleptoparasitic Megalopta species. In many dead nests, slits are found in the stick and the cells are destroyed. This is thought to be the work of the silky anteater, Cyclopes didactylus, but is unconfirmed. Females also often have large numbers of nematodes in their metasomal glands. The larvae of a parasitic fly, Fiebrigella sp., consume the pollen stores in Megalopta cells, causing the larvae inhabiting those cells to have a smaller body size. Parkia velutina is pollinated by Megalopta

=== Cleptoparasitism ===
Cogener cleptoparasitism has been observed in the subgenus Noctoraptor. This means that these bees parasitize other Megalopta species. M. byroni parasitizes M. genalis and M. ecuadoria, but most likely parasitizes other species. In the case of Noctoraptor, cleptoparasitism takes the form of brood parasitism. Noctoraptor do not have the physiology to build nests or cells, making them obligate parasites that invade the nests of the other Megalopta to lay eggs.

== Species and subgenera ==
There is considerable discourse on the phylogeny within Megalopta. One school of thought states Megalopta has two subgenera: Megalopta and Noctoraptor. The subgenus Noctoraptor was described in 1997, with the type species of M. byroni. M. byroni was the first known nocturnal parasitic bee. Noctoraptor can be differentiated from other Megalopta by anatomical differences that are linked to parasitism, including a reduced scopa, large scythe-shaped mandibles, and the lack of a basitibial plate. In newer literature, instead of being classified into the two subgenera, the divisions are made between five species groups: Aegis, Amoena, Yanomami, Byroni, and Sodalis. These groups are defined by similar physical characteristics. The Byroni species group contains the species that would be in Noctoraptor. These species groups have been determined for Megalopta in Brazil, so the species group listings do not include all known species. The species group system is not widely used.

Regardless of subgenera or species groups, Megalopta is most likely paraphyletic and is grouped with the genus Xenochlora, with the species M. atra being most closely related to Xenochlora over other Megalopta. Xenochlora may be a subgenus of Megalopta. M. atra is considered a highland species, while the rest of the genus is lowland. Megalopta, Megommation, and Megaloptidia form a single clade with a dim-light foraging ancestor. This implies that the Xenochlora clade reverted to diurnal foraging after the adaptations to nocturnal foraging evolved.

The species Megalopta amoena has been known under several different names: Megalopta ecuadoria, Megalopta centralis, Megalopta idalia, Megalopta gibbosa, Megalopta ochrias, Megalopta lecointei, and Megalopta vigilans.

=== List of species ===
- Megalopta aegis (Vachal, 1904)
- Megalopta aeneicollis Friese, 1926
- Megalopta amoena (Spinola, 1853)
- Megalopta atlantica Santos & Silveira, 2009
- Megalopta atra Engel, 2006
- Megalopta boliviensis Friese, 1926
- Megalopta byroni Engel, Brooks & Yanega, 1997
- Megalopta chaperi (Vachal, 1904)
- Megalopta cuprea Friese, 1911
- Megalopta furunculosa Hinojosa-Diaz & Engel, 2003
- Megalopta genalis Meade-Waldo, 1916
- Megalopta guarani Santos & Melo, 2014
- Megalopta guimaraesi Santos & Silveira, 2009
- Megalopta huaoranii Gonzalez, Griswold & Ayala, 2010
- Megalopta karitiana Santos & Melo, 2014
- Megalopta mapinguari Santos & Melo, 2014
- Megalopta munduruku Santos & Melo, 2014
- Megalopta mura Santos & Melo, 2014
- Megalopta nigriventris Friese, 1926
- Megalopta nitidicollis Friese, 1926
- Megalopta noctifurax Engel, Brooks & Yanega, 1997
- Megalopta notiocleptis Engel, 2011
- Megalopta peruana Friese, 1926
- Megalopta piraha Santos & Melo, 2014
- Megalopta purpurata Smith, 1879
- Megalopta sodalis (Vachal, 1904)
- Megalopta sulciventris Friese, 1926
- Megalopta tacarunensis Cockerell, 1923
- Megalopta tetewana Gonzalez, Griswold & Ayala, 2010
- Megalopta xavante Santos & Melo, 2014
- Megalopta yanomami Santos & Melo, 2014

=== Species groups ===
- Aegis species group
  - Megalopta aegis
  - Megalopta aeneicollis
  - Megalopta nitidicollis
  - Megalopta sulciventris
- Amoena species group
  - Megalopta amoena
  - Megalopta chaperi
  - Megalopta guimaraesi
  - Megalopta mura
- Yanomami species group
  - Megalopta piraha
  - Megalopta yanomami
- Byroni species group
  - Megalopta atlantica
  - Megalopta byroni
  - Megalopta guarani
  - Megalopta karitiana
  - Megalopta mapinguari
  - Megalopta noctifurax
  - Megalopta purpurata
  - Megalopta xavante
- Sodalis species group
  - Megalopta cuprea
  - Megalopta munduruku
  - Megalopta sodalis
