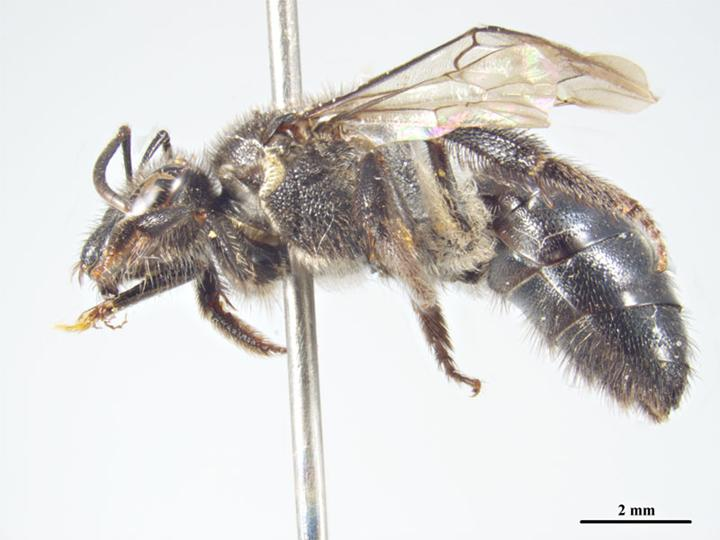
- Female

Scientific classification
- Kingdom: Animalia
- Phylum: Arthropoda
- Clade: Pancrustacea
- Class: Insecta
- Order: Hymenoptera
- Family: Halictidae
- Genus: Lasioglossum
- Species: L. carbonarium

Binomial name
- Lasioglossum carbonarium Smith, 1853

Synonyms
- Halictus carbonarius Smith, 1853; Parasphecodes fumidicaudus Cockerell, 1914; Parasphecodes noachinus Cockerell, 1914

= Lasioglossum carbonarium =

Species of bee

Lasioglossum carbonarium, or Lasioglossum (Parasphecodes) carbonarium, is a species of bee in the family Halictidae and subfamily Halictinae. It is endemic to Australia. It was described by English entomologist Frederick Smith in 1853.

== Distribution and habitat ==
The species occurs in south-eastern Australia. Type localities include Sydney, Stradbroke Island, and Ararat, Victoria.

== Behaviour ==
The adults are flying mellivores. Flowering plants visited by the bees include Hibbertia, Epacris, Daviesia, Jacksonia, Calytrix, Leptospermum, Prasophyllum and Veronica species.

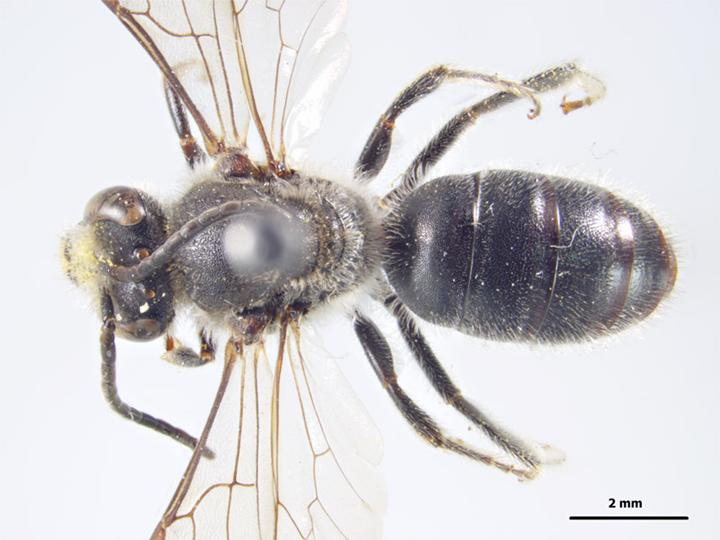
Male
