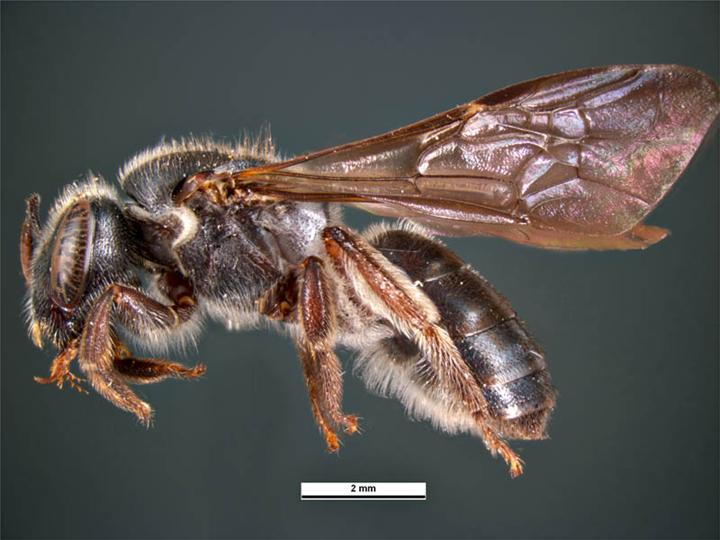
- Female
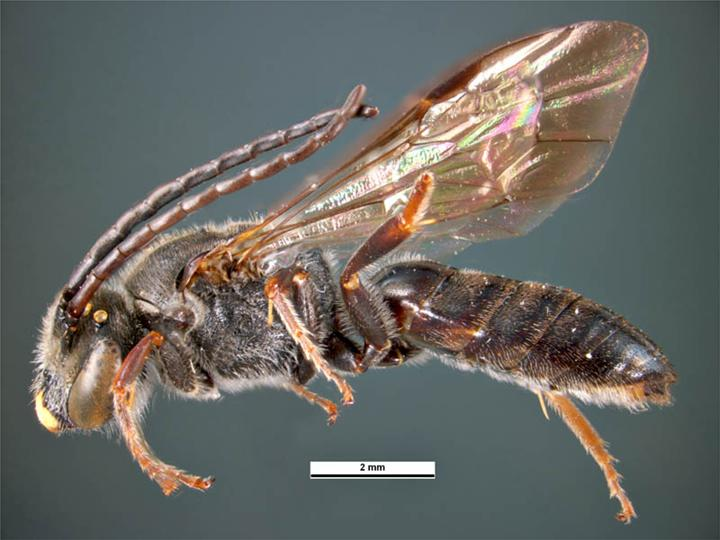
- Male

Scientific classification
- Kingdom: Animalia
- Phylum: Arthropoda
- Clade: Pancrustacea
- Class: Insecta
- Order: Hymenoptera
- Family: Halictidae
- Genus: Lasioglossum
- Species: L. plorator

Binomial name
- Lasioglossum plorator (Cockerell, 1910)

Synonyms
- Parasphecodes plorator Cockerell, 1910

= Lasioglossum plorator =

Species of bee

Lasioglossum plorator, or Lasioglossum (Australictus) plorator, is a species of bee in the family Halictidae and subfamily Halictinae. It is endemic to Australia. It was described by British-American entomologist Theodore Dru Alison Cockerell in 1910.

== Description ==
Female body length is about 10 mm. Integumental colouration is mainly black, with dark reddish markings; the hair is dull white.

== Distribution and habitat ==
The species occurs in south-eastern Australia. The type locality is Melbourne.

== Behaviour ==
The adults are flying mellivores. They nest in rotten wood and have sedentary larvae. Flowering plants visited by the bees include Helichrysum and Leptospermum species.
