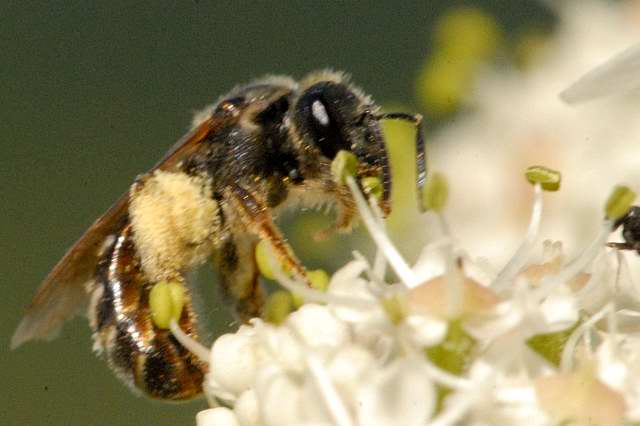

Scientific classification
- Kingdom: Animalia
- Phylum: Arthropoda
- Clade: Pancrustacea
- Class: Insecta
- Order: Hymenoptera
- Family: Halictidae
- Genus: Lasioglossum
- Species: L. leucozonium

Binomial name
- Lasioglossum leucozonium (Schrank, 1781)

= Lasioglossum leucozonium =

Species of bee

Lasioglossum leucozonium (Schrank, 1781), also known as Lasioglossum similis, is a widespread solitary sweat bee found in North America, Europe, Asia, and parts of northern Africa. While it is now a common bee in North America, population genetic analysis has shown that it is actually an introduced species in this region. This population was most likely founded by a single female bee.

== Taxonomy and phylogeny ==
L. leucozonium is part of the subfamily Halictinae, of the Hymenoptera family Halictidae. The largest, most diverse and recently diverged of the four halictid subfamilies, Halictinae (sweat bees) is made up of five tribes of which L. leucozonium is part of Halictini, which contains over 2000 species. Genus Lasioglossum is informally divided into two series: the Lasioglossum series and the Hemihalictus. L. leucozonium is a part of the Old World series and is most closely related to L. callizonium, L. zonulum, and L. majus. However, there is genetic variation within the species depending on its location.

== Description and identification ==
While occasionally compared to its close relative, L. zonulum, L. leucozonium has distinct features that separate it from other Lasioglossum species. There are also differences in appearance between females and males. Additionally, its eye has been studied in relation to the nocturnal bee Megalopta genalis.

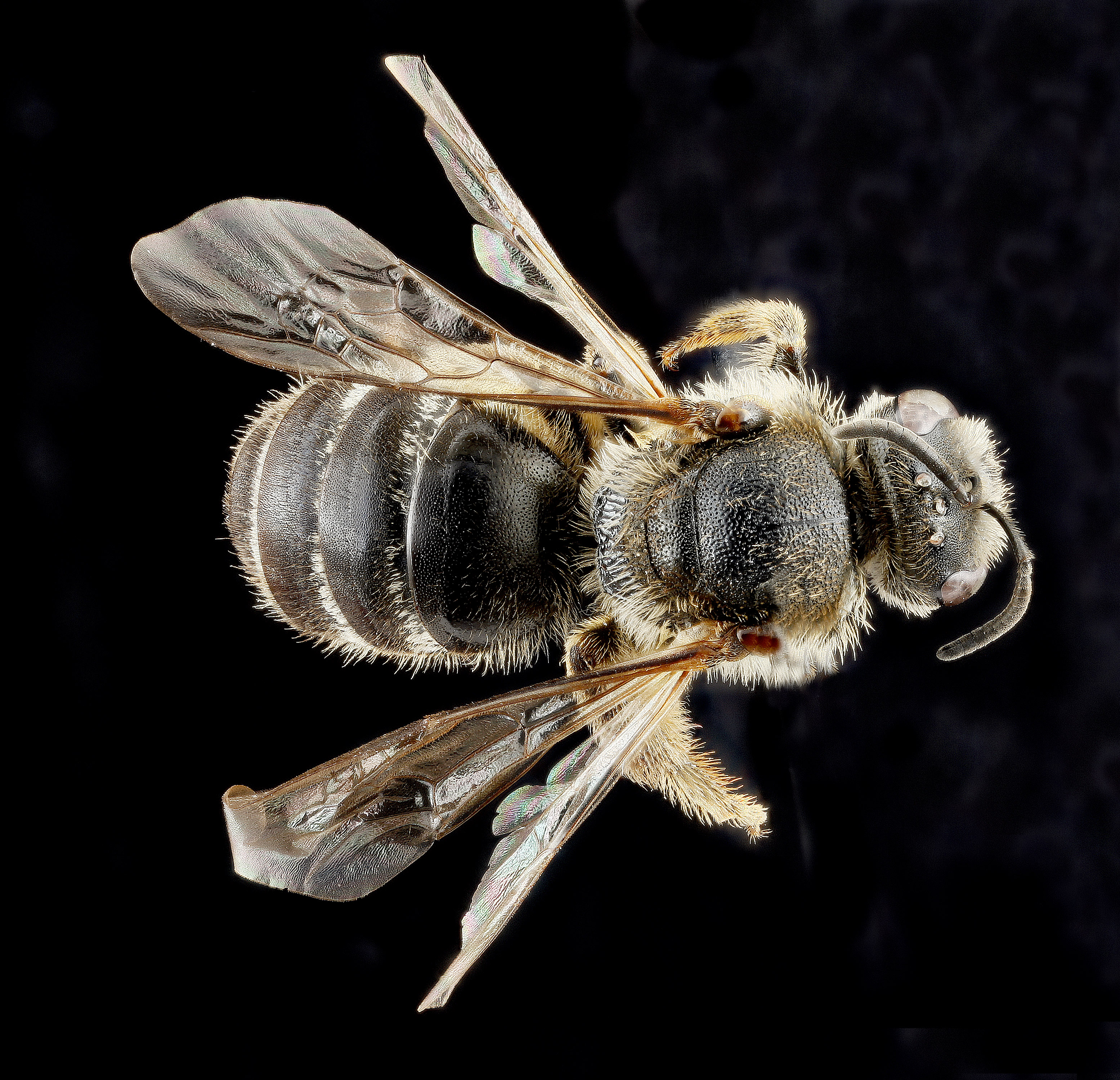
Top view of Lasioglossum leucozonium

=== Females ===
Front of insect head diagram

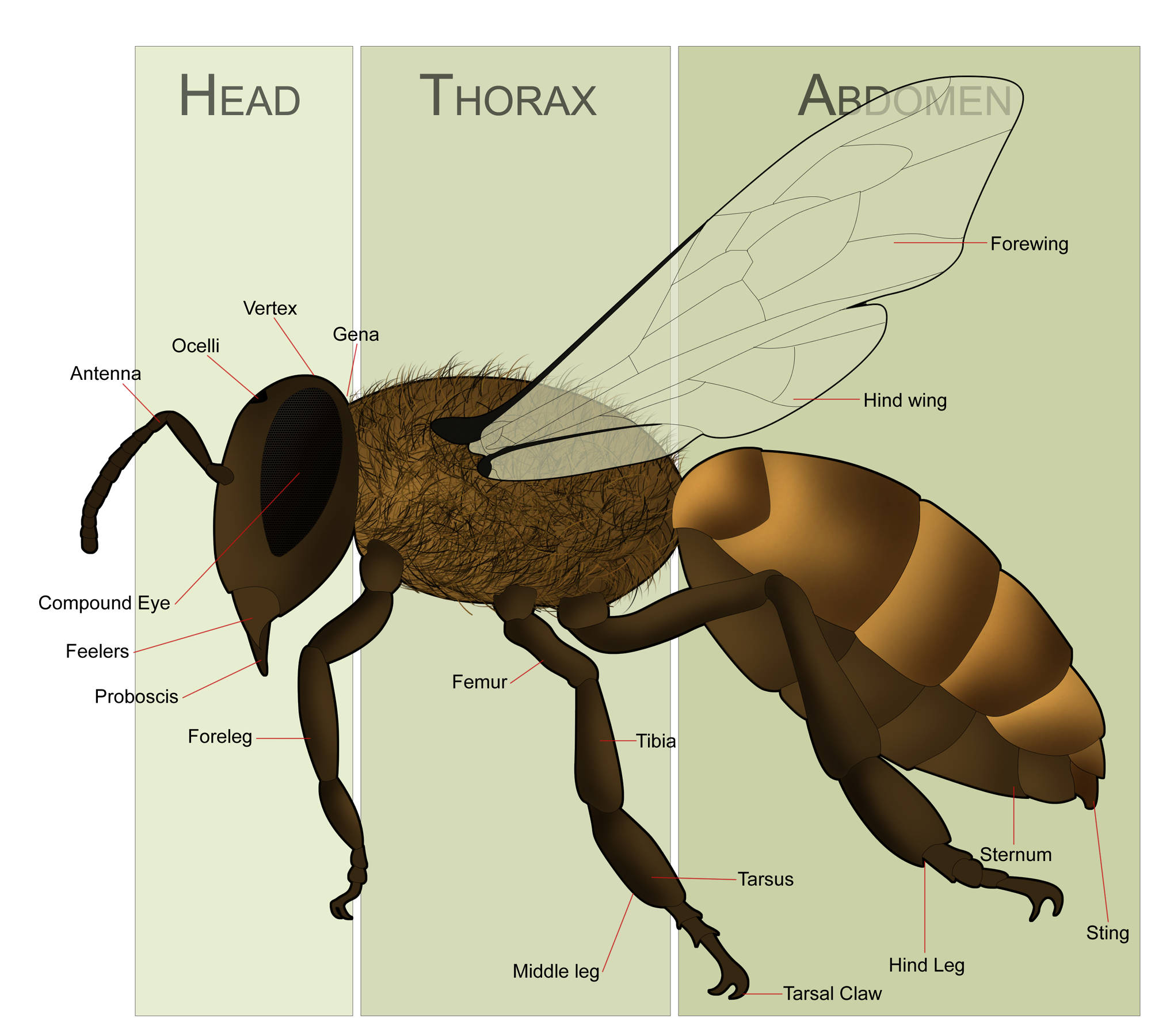
Hymenoptera morphology

Female L. leucozonium are recognizable by their rough and relatively short propodeal dorsal areas. The smooth surface of these areas has horizontal stripes which are divided in the middle, which is a unique characteristic of Eastern United States Lasioglossum species, a feature shared only with L. zonulum. Its dull, grainy first metasomal tergum has well-developed punctures separated by 1-1.5 times their width, and its vertex behind the ocelli has stripes. In comparison to L. zonulum, the pronotal angle of L. leucozonium projects out less but is still obtuse. The pronotum has a well-developed dorsal edge and an incomplete lateral ridge, of which the lower part is unnoticeable and broadly rounded, divided by a slanted groove. With a rounded lip on the scutum of their middle thoracic segment raised from the pronotum, it has a propodeal triangle that is well defined by a carinate rim. It has an elongated head, a shiny face, and an evenly rounded, slightly protruding, and extremely grainy supraclypeal area that is uniformly and densely spotted with punctures separated by their width or less. It also has a somewhat granulated and shiny clypeus, protruding below the eyes, with a surface that has a lot of punctures without a groove in the middle. The distance between its lateral ocelli is greater than that between the lateral ocelli and the eye. While the lateral edge of its metasomal tergum II is only slightly wavy, the distal keel of its labrum is somewhat broad in the front and gradually narrows moving back to the tip. Its moderately shiny mesoscutum has a microscopically patterned surface, and its scutellum has nearly uniform punctures like that of the mesoscutum. There is white to yellowish white hair on the head and thorax, though the thorax has some brown hairs on the scutellum. The slightly separated hind tibial hair is mostly pale yellowish brown while the dorsal hairs are light brown. On the metasomal tergum I and terga II-IV, the hair is white with a band of hair on terga II-IV and elongated hairs scattered over the anterior surface of tergum I. Its mesoscutal hairs are moderately dense and seem feathery, and its wing membrane has a glassy, translucent appearance.

=== Males ===
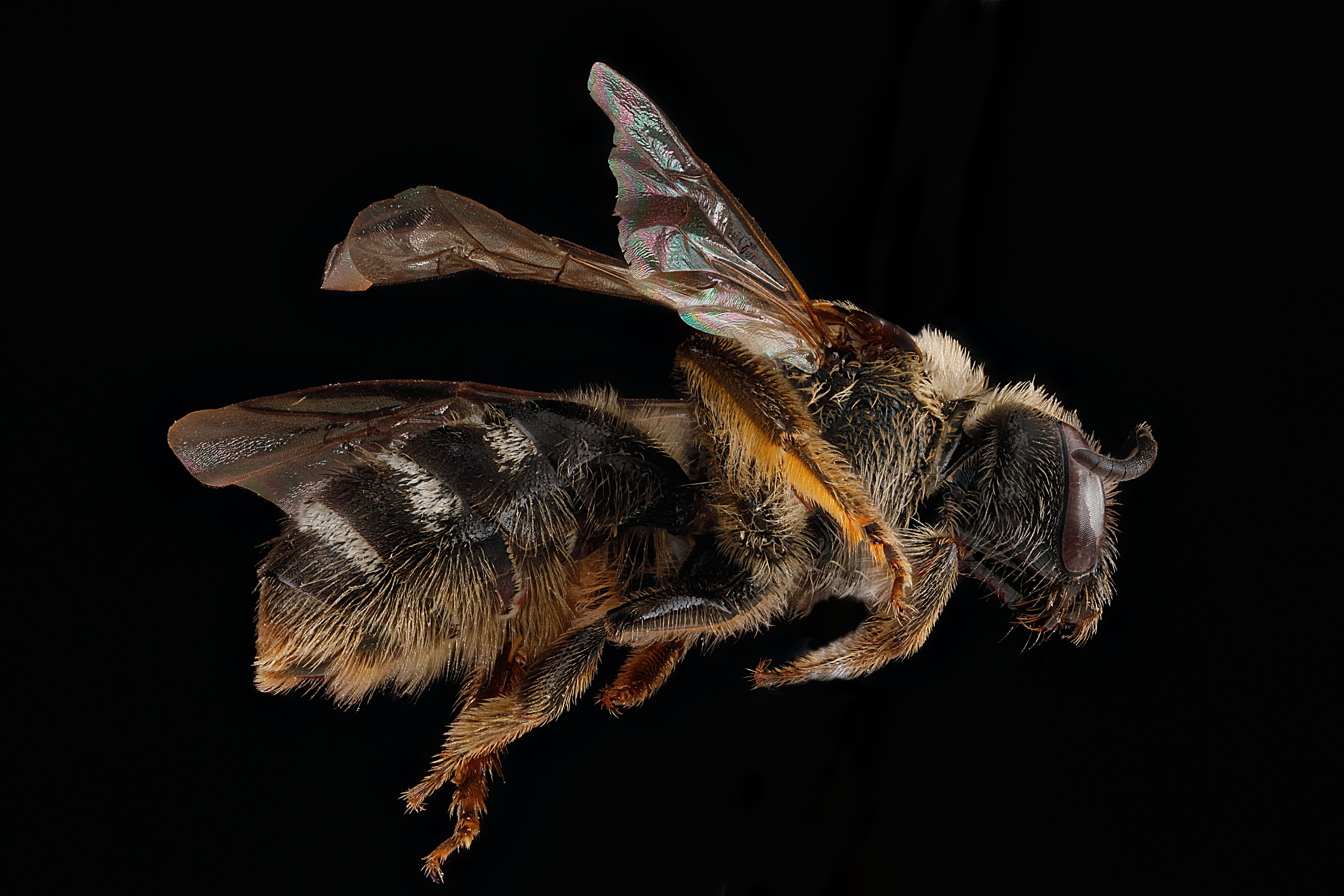
Side view of Lasioglossum leucozonium

A male L. leucozonium is distinguished by its rounded clypeus, its ventrally narrowed head, its yellow back of the tarsus of its middle and hind legs, its wrinkled propodeal dorsal surface, its dense, flattened hair patch on the posterior edge of sternum V, and its inverted V-shaped patch of hair on sternum VI. In general, the males are similar to the females. However, other differences include rounded gena that are wider than the eye; a broadly rounded clypeal surface; a labrum with rounded and slightly developed distal processes, an evenly rounded bottom area with a small circular depression in the middle, and somewhat developed depressions on its sides; and a short mandible. The shiny clypeus is a little grainy with uniform punctures and clypeal spots. The front of the tarsus is entirely dark while the middle and hind back of the tarsus are yellowish white except for the dark distal edges. The hairs on sternum IV are erect and elongated without a noticeable pattern. Its sternum VII is somewhat smaller and slender, its sternum VIII does not have a bulge in the middle, and its sternal disc is small and narrow. With respect to genitalia, the base is moderately short with a gonostylus that is large, flat, and rounded at the tip. There is no membranous lobe that is turned backwards, but there is volsella with prominent lateral ridges.

=== Eye ===
L. leucozonium fly relatively fast, meaning they must rely on their compound eyes for orientation and foraging, but only in bright light. Their eyes contain over 3,000 facets with a maximum diameter of 20 μm. With a 41-μm-thick cornea consisting of a convex inner and outer cornea, it has slightly developed and fused corneal bulges. Its lamina has no branching and only its L2 and L4-fiber types are spread laterally.

== Distribution and habitat ==
L. leucozonium is found in open habitats, normally on sandy or chalky soil, though it is also more rarely found on heavy clay. As a holarctic bee, it can be found from Wisconsin to New Jersey up to Cape Breton Island in North America, as well as throughout Europe. Its nests can sometimes be found in aggregations, although it is a solitary bee.

=== Nest structure ===
Created by one to two females, the nest of L. leucozonium is made in flat to slightly inclined light soil in conditions that are sparsely vegetated or have short grass. Descending vertically, the main tunnel has cells at the end of short side tunnels. Nests can have 8 to 15 cells per female.

== Colony cycle ==
In North America, females and males are active around the same time; they are typically most active between the beginning of May and mid-August. Females are most active in early June, while males are most active in late July and August.

== Development and reproduction ==
L. leucozonium only produces a single generation per year. The cells of a nest fosters a sexual brood within the same year they are created. After the offspring mature, they mate and then enter hibernation. While there is only a single generation in a year, it has two annual exits of female, one at the beginning where females make the nests and mate, and the other after the brood leaves to mate.

== Behavior and ecology ==
L. leucozonium is a diurnal, ground-nesting bee. It hibernates during the winter, during which it stays underground. Females are singly-mated at this time.

=== Nesting biology ===
A mining bee, L. leucozonium digs into the ground to make its nests. One to two females help create the nest, and for each female, 8 to 15 cells are made. Since it is a solitary bee, most likely these females are working communally rather than socially. After the creation of the nest, the offspring leave the nest, mate with others, and then hibernate underground for the winter, most likely in different places from their original nests.

=== Social organization ===
As a solitary bee, L. leucozonium generally works by itself. When another female works with it to build a nest, they work communally rather than socially, therefore they double the amount of work they can do rather than declining in efficiency with the added number of females.

== Interaction with other species ==
L. leucozonium, though solitary, interacts with plants and parasites. Plants provide it with pollen and nectar as food for both themselves and their larvae, while parasites and predators affect their survival.

=== Diet ===
L. leucozonium adults and larvae feed on pollen from various flowers. As a generalist, they are not as picky about which flowers they choose compared to a specialist. They also has been seen visiting apple trees and lowbush blueberries.

==== Flowers ====
L. leucozonium most frequently visit yellow-flowered Asteraceae like Hieracium caespitosum, Krigia biflora, Rudbeckia hirta, but have been seen to also visit creeping thistle (Cirsium arvense) and other plants, which include plants from Campanula and Rosa as well as Cornus alternifolia. Males are also commonly found on Melilotus.

=== Parasitoids ===
While there are no parasites of the genus Sphecodes that solely parasitize L. leucozonium, S. ephippius has been shown to parasitize it as well as other Lasioglossum.

=== Predation ===
Philanthus wasps are common predators of L. leucozonium.
