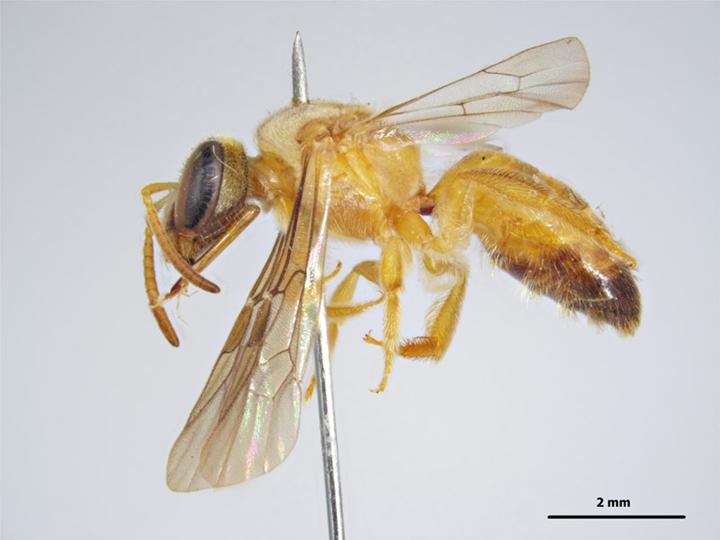
- Female

Scientific classification
- Kingdom: Animalia
- Phylum: Arthropoda
- Clade: Pancrustacea
- Class: Insecta
- Order: Hymenoptera
- Family: Halictidae
- Genus: Lasioglossum
- Species: L. contaminatum

Binomial name
- Lasioglossum contaminatum (Cockerell, 1910)

Synonyms
- Parasphecodes contaminatus Cockerell, 1910

= Lasioglossum contaminatum =

Species of bee

Lasioglossum contaminatum, or Lasioglossum (Cnephalictus) contaminatum, is a species of bee in the family Halictidae and subfamily Halictinae. It is endemic to Australia. It was described by British-American entomologist Theodore Dru Alison Cockerell in 1910.

== Description ==
Male body length is about 8 mm. Integumental colouration is mainly light orange-brown, with dark brown markings.

== Distribution and habitat ==
The species occurs in tropical north-eastern Australia. The type locality is Kuranda, Queensland.

== Behaviour ==
The adults are flying mellivores.
