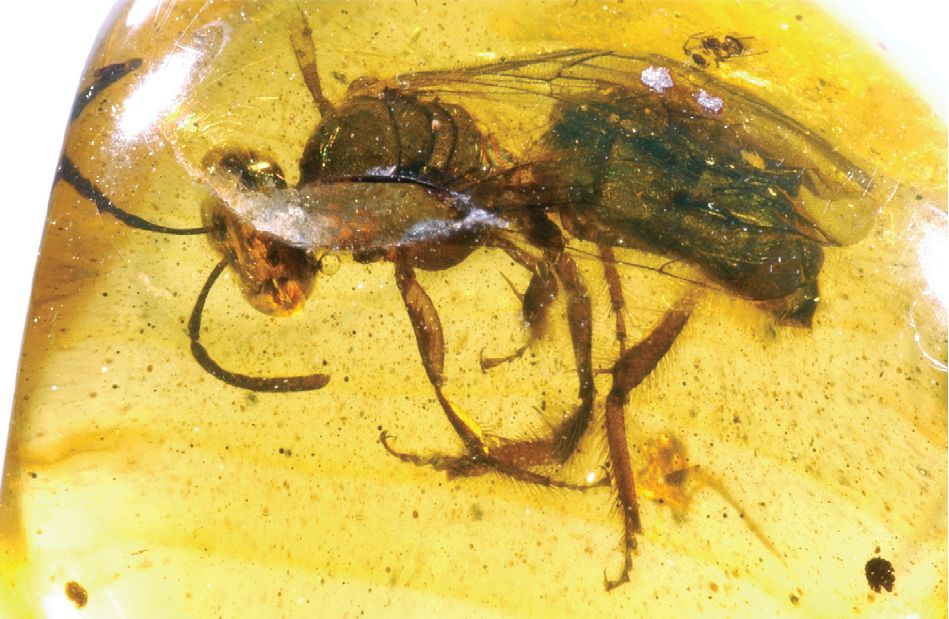
- Oligochlora semirugosa holotype

Scientific classification
- Kingdom: Animalia
- Phylum: Arthropoda
- Clade: Pancrustacea
- Class: Insecta
- Order: Hymenoptera
- Family: Halictidae
- Tribe: Augochlorini
- Genus: †Oligochlora; Engel, 1996

Subgenera and species
- Oligochlora (Oligochlora); O. eickworti; O. grimaldii; O. micheneri; O. semirugosa; Oligochlora (Soliapis); O. marquettorum; O. rozeni

= Oligochlora =

Oligochlora Temporal range: Burdigalian

Extinct genus of bees

Oligochlora is an extinct genus of sweat bee in the Halictidae subfamily Halictinae. The genus currently contains six species, all of which are known from the early Miocene Burdigalian stage Dominican amber deposits on the island of Hispaniola.

== History and classification ==
The genus was first described by Dr. Michael Engel in a 1996 paper published in the Journal of the Kansas Entomological Society. The genus name is a combination of "Oligo", from Oligocene a possible age of the amber and "chlora" from the genus Augochlora, the type genus of the tribe Augochlorini where Oligochlora is placed. Along with the genus description, the paper contained the description of the type species O. eickworti and the second species O. micheneri. Dr Engel described a third species, O. grimaldii in 1997. A fourth species, O. rozeni was published in 2000 and the genus was split into two subgenera, Oligochlora (Oligochlora) and Oligochlora (Soliapis). The subgenus Soliapis is named from the Latin words sola, meaning "alone", and apis, meaning "bee" in reference the lack of an acarinarium on O. rozeni. A fifth species, O. marquettorum was also published in 2000, jointly described by Dr. Engel and Molly G. Rightmyer and placed into O. (Soliapis). In 2009, with the publication of O. semirugosa by Dr. Engel, the total number of species was raised to six.

== Description ==
Oligochlora is most similar to the extant genus Neocorynura, from which it can be separated by the shapes of the mesoscutum and preoccipital ridge or the monotypic genus Thectochlora which also has a mutualistic relationship with specialized acarid mites. The genus also superficially resembles the genus Corynura but differs in a number of features including the lack of eye hairs.

=== O. eickworti ===
O. eickworti is known from the holotype only, a single 7.6 millimetres (0.30 in) long female currently in the private collection owned by Ettore Morone of Turin, Italy as number "684". The species is named in honor of Dr. George Eickwort, who specialized in Halictidae systematics.

=== O. micheneri ===
The O. micheneri holotype is also a female in the Morone collection, as specimen number "167" and has a body length of approximately 7.8 millimetres (0.31 in). The head and metasoma are a brilliant metallic green with brown edges. Dr. Engel named O. micheneri for Dr. Charles D. Michener who devoted most of his research career studying bees.

=== O. grimaldii ===
Dr. Engel described O. grimaldii in the journal Apidologie in 1997 from a female specimen. The single 7.2 millimetres (0.28 in) long bee specimen is deposited in the American Museum of Natural History Department of Entomology as number "DR-14-839". The species has a heavily sclerotized black Sc+R vein and the remaining veins are brown. The species is named in honor of Dr. David Grimaldi for his contributions to insect paleontology and study of amber.

=== O. rozeni ===
O. rozeni is known from the 8.2 millimetres (0.32 in) long holotype female, number "M-2523" of the Morone collection. The species, named in honor of Jerome G. Rozen, Jr. of the American Museum of Natural History, is distinguishable from other members of the genus by the lack of and acarinarium on the upper side of the metasoma.

=== O. marquettorum ===
The first species to be described from more than one individual bee was O. marquettorum, which was described from both a holotype and a paratype, both females, preserved in a single amber specimen. Published in the May/June 2000 issue of the journal Apidologie, the amber containing the two bees is in the American Museum of Natural History as number "DR-14-1484". Lack of an acarinarium places O. marquettorum in O. (Soliapis) and the species can be distinguished from O. rozeni by the obtuse angle of the pronotum. The species is named in honor of George Edward Marquette and Jennie Smith Proskine Marquette, grandparents of M. Rightmyer.

=== O. semirugosa ===
O. semirugosa is the newest addition to the genus and the fourth species in the subgenus O. (Oligochlora). The holotype is a 7.9 millimetres (0.31 in) female specimen, number KU-DR-21 in the collections of the University of Kansas Natural History Museum, is named from the Latin semi meaning "half" or "partial" and rugosus meaning, "wrinkled". This name refers to the species' distinct rugulose gena which along with the pronotal angle, the partially and sculpturing of the face, mesosoma, and metasomal terga are unique.
