= Ischnomelissa rasmusseni =

Scientific classification
- Domain: Eukaryota
- Kingdom: Animalia
- Phylum: Arthropoda
- Class: Insecta
- Order: Hymenoptera
- Family: Halictidae
- Genus: Ischnomelissa
- Species: I. rasmusseni

Binomial name
- Ischnomelissa rasmusseni Engel & Brooks, 2002

Species of bee

Ischnomelissa rasmusseni is a Neotropic bee in the family Halictidae.
