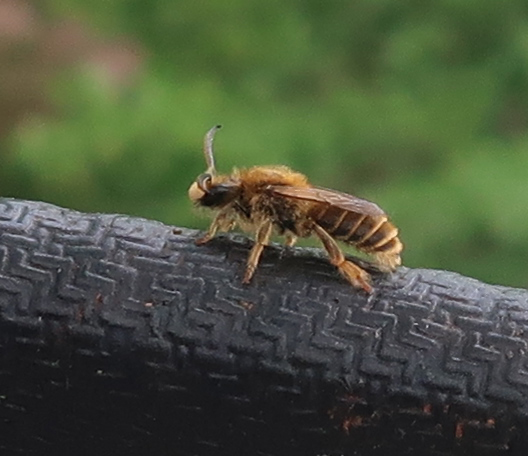
- Rophites algirus

Scientific classification
- Domain: Eukaryota
- Kingdom: Animalia
- Phylum: Arthropoda
- Class: Insecta
- Order: Hymenoptera
- Family: Halictidae
- Genus: Rophites; Spinola, 1808

= Rophites =

Genus of insects

Rophites is a genus of bees belonging to the family Halictidae.

The species of this genus are found in Eurasia.

== Species ==
The following species are recognised in the genus Rophites:

- Rophites algirus Pérez, 1895
- Rophites anatolicus (Schwammberger, 1975)
- Rophites canus Eversmann, 1852
- Rophites caucasicus Morawitz, 1875
- Rophites clypealis Schwammberger, 1976
- Rophites epiroticus (Schwammberger, 1975)
- Rophites flavicornis (Friese, 1913)
- Rophites foveolatus Friese, 1900
- Rophites gruenwaldti Ebmer, 1978
- Rophites gusenleitneri Schwammberger, 1971
- Rophites hartmanni Friese, 1902
- Rophites heinrichi Schwammberger, 1976
- Rophites hellenicus Ebmer, 1984
- Rophites leclercqi Schwammberger, 1971
- Rophites mandibularis Morawitz, 1891
- Rophites nigripes Friese, 1902
- Rophites quinquespinosus Spinola, 1808
- Rophites schoenitzeri Dubitzky, 2005
- Rophites spec Benoist, 1930
- Rophites spec Morawitz, 1875
- Rophites spec Perez, 1895
- Rophites theryi Benoist, 1930
- Rophites thracius Ebmer, 1993
- Rophites transitorius Ebmer, 1993
- Rophites trispinosus Schummel, 1829
