= Sweat bee =

Sweat bee is a common name for various bees that are attracted to the salt in human sweat. It can refer to:

- Small bees in the family Halictidae, common across the world, particularly:
  - Agapostemon, Augochlora, Augochlorella, and Augochloropsis, metallic green sweat bees
  - Lasioglossum and Halictus, black and white bees; two of the most abundant genera within the family Halictidae
- Less commonly, various stingless bees of the family Apidae:
  - Plebeina armata, also called Mopane Fly, native to Africa
  - Trigona, of the Americas

== See also ==
- Hoverfly, type of fly, often confused with a bee due to similar black and yellow stripes
