= Parkia velutina =

Scientific classification
- Kingdom: Plantae
- Clade: Tracheophytes
- Clade: Angiosperms
- Clade: Eudicots
- Clade: Rosids
- Order: Fabales
- Family: Fabaceae
- Subfamily: Caesalpinioideae
- Clade: Mimosoid clade
- Genus: Parkia
- Species: P. velutina

Binomial name
- Parkia velutina Benoist

Species of legume

Parkia velutina (common name corezeiro) is a rainforest tree growing to 40 m high, native to tropical South America. It belongs to the subfamily Mimosoideae of the family Fabaceae. The leaves are tripinnate, with 30–45 pairs of primary pinnae (rarely as few as 17 pairs, or up to 55 pairs) arranged opposite or subopposite on the leaf rachis. Each pinna has 40–110 pairs of leaflets. The flowers are produced in a compound, pear-shaped inflorescence, and are pollinated by bees of the genus Megalopta.
