= Ischnomelissa =

Scientific classification
- Domain: Eukaryota
- Kingdom: Animalia
- Phylum: Arthropoda
- Class: Insecta
- Order: Hymenoptera
- Family: Halictidae
- Tribe: Augochlorini
- Genus: Ischnomelissa; Engel, 1997

Type species
- Ischnomelissa zonata

Genus of bees

Ischnomelissa is a genus of bees belonging to the family Halictidae.

The species of this genus are found in South America.

Species:

- Ischnomelissa cyanea Brooks & Engel, 1998
- Ischnomelissa ecuadoriana Brooks & Engel, 1998
- Ischnomelissa lescheni Brooks & Engel, 1998
- Ischnomelissa lignopteryx Engel, 2013
- Ischnomelissa octogesima Brooks & Engel, 1998
- Ischnomelissa rasmusseni Engel & Brooks, 2002
- Ischnomelissa rhina Brooks & Engel, 1998
- Ischnomelissa zonata Engel, 1997
