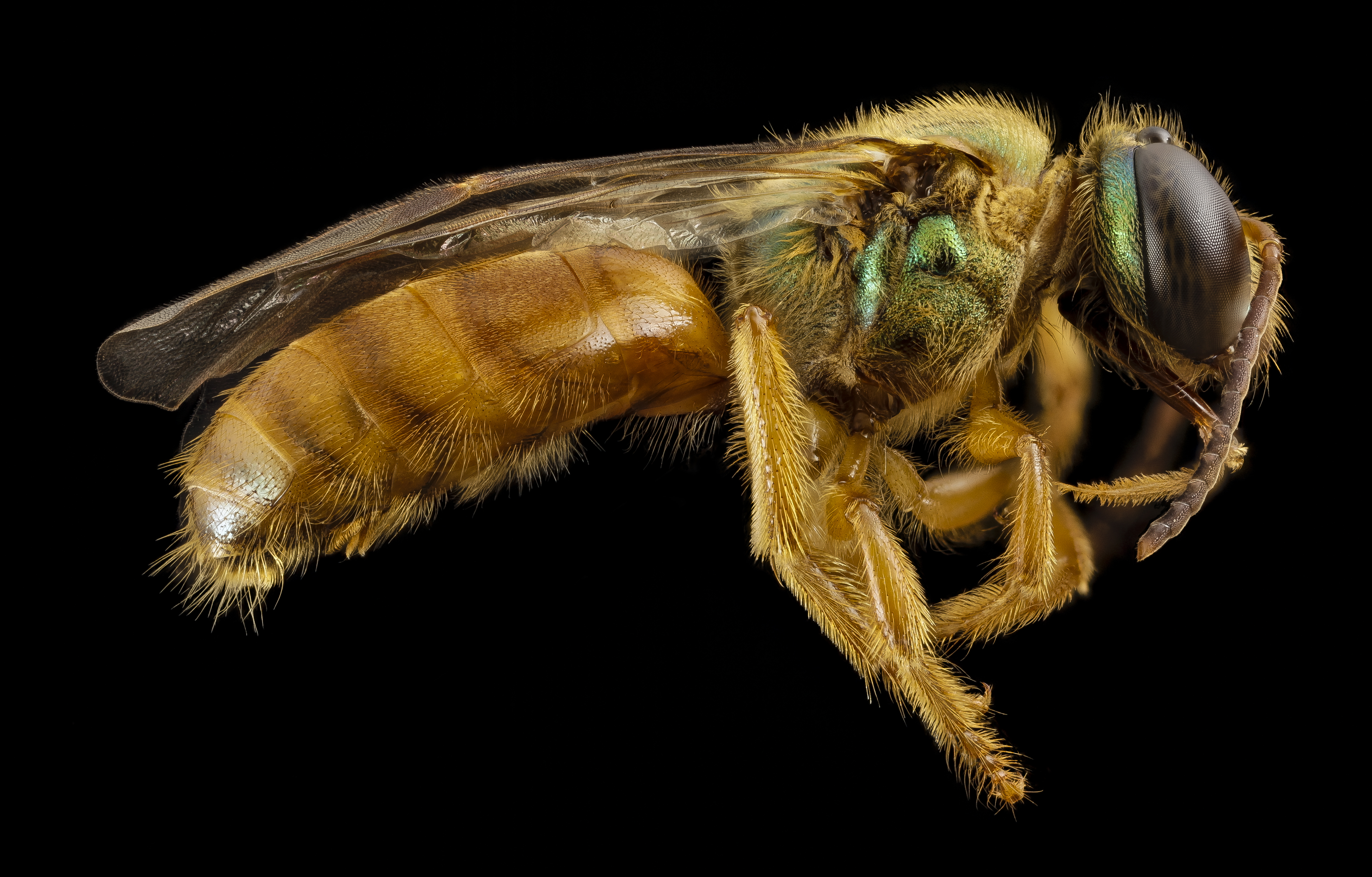

Scientific classification
- Kingdom: Animalia
- Phylum: Arthropoda
- Clade: Pancrustacea
- Class: Insecta
- Order: Hymenoptera
- Family: Halictidae
- Genus: Megalopta
- Species: M. genalis

Binomial name
- Megalopta genalis Meade-Waldo, 1916

Synonyms
- Megalopta panamensis Cockerell, 1918 (Nom. Nud.); Megalopta fornix panamensis Cockerell, 1919; Megalopta tabascana Cockerell, 1919; Megalopta tabescens Cockerell, 1923 (missp.); Megalopta armata Friese, 1926

= Megalopta genalis =

Species of bee

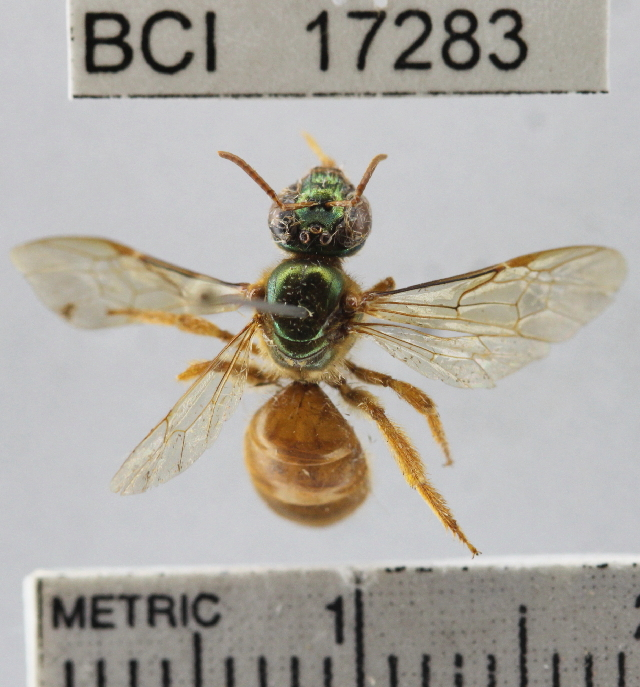
Museum specimen

Megalopta genalis is a nocturnal species of the family Halictidae, otherwise known as the sweat bees. The bee is native to Central and South America. Its eyes have anatomical adaptations that make them 27 times more sensitive to light than diurnal bees, giving it the ability to be nocturnal. However, its eyes are not completely different from other diurnal bees but are still apposition compound eyes. The difference therefore lies purely in adaptations to become nocturnal, increasing the success of foraging and minimizing the danger of doing so from predation. This species has served as a model organism in studies of social behavior and night vision in bees.

== Taxonomy and phylogeny ==
Megalopta genalis is a sweat bee of the family Halictidae. The term "sweat bee" refers to the organism's attraction to human sweat and perspiration. These bees have metallic nature, specifically a green color in this species. The bee is studied for its unusual transition from diurnal to nocturnal behavior.

== Description and identification ==
This bee is variable in size, especially among females. The average female has an intertegular distance (the width of the body measured between the wing bases) of 3 millimeters, and the average male is more slender, with an intertegular distance of about 2.4 millimeters. Gynandromorphy occurs in this species, where an individual of one sex can have some body parts of the opposite sex. Upon emerging from the egg it takes the bee about 35 days to reach adulthood.

The species creates nests in dead wood, usually in a tunnel-like fashion. It typically uses fallen branches and vines that lie in tangles in the understory of rain forests. The sticks used for nesting are 1 to 10 centimeters wide. It creates a tunnel with an opening surrounded by a collar of crumbled wood. The cells inside the nest are made of wood fibers. The adult female bee places a loaf of pollen in each cell and lays an egg on top.

== Distribution and habitat ==
Like other bees of its genus, M. genalis nests in dead wood. They live in the range between Mexico and Southern Brazil, and are therefore often studied in the Republic of Panama and northern Colombia, where they are largely prevalent.

This bee collects pollen from tropical plants in its habitat, including kapok (Ceiba pentandra), pochote (Pachira quinata), hog plums (Spondias spp.), and acacias, as well as Vismia baccifera and Pseudobombax septenatum.

Females either exhibit solitary or social behavior, where they build their nests in small branches above the ground. They are traditionally active at night, making this species especially interesting and difficult to study.

== Colony cycle ==
M. genalis is atypical in its social behavior, as they are usually social in small colonies of roughly two or three bees or are solitary females. In the two-bee nests, there is usually a worker bee and a queen bee, where division of labor is the same as seen in bigger colonies. The nests are founded by individual queen bees, who then raise their first brood on their own before increasing the colony size. A week or so after the young bees emerge, they disperse and find their own nests or begin foraging.

This species is facultatively (optionally) social; meaning that they may live communally when it is advantageous to do so, or otherwise be solitary nesters. They mass provision their nests, stocking them with all the pollen that the larvae will need to grow to maturity. The group size and frequency of social nesting change across the seasons. At the start of the dry season most bees are solitary, but later in the season up to half of the nests have multiple females. Nests can have up to 11 females, but usually no more than 4. In Panama, where most studies of the species are conducted, they are normally found to be active in the dry season only. In addition, larger colonies seemed to be more prevalent towards the end of the active season. Because the species is facultatively social, it has been shown that an increasing colony size is linked to indirect benefits for those females who do not reproduce, which increases the reproductive output of the colony as a whole.

== Behavior ==
=== Dominance hierarchy ===
As stated previously, females of the species usually exhibit solitary behavior or stay in small groups. While this species is predominately solitary in behavior, it has been observed that queens are capable of co-inhabiting with other queens, as long as there is a clear dominance-submission relationship. This is largely determined by ovary size: females with larger ovaries are dominant over those females with smaller ovaries. The size of the ovaries are different according to the size of the bee, meaning that smaller bees are more likely to be foragers with undeveloped ovaries. Among reproductive females, however, size does not have an effect on fecundity. Also included in this dominance determination is age: females with older age were more dominant. Females with fewer nest-mates are more likely to be aggressive towards other females than those with more nest-mates, demonstrating that social isolation could lead to aggression. In Halictidae species, it has been found that queens ram their heads into other adults in order to exert their dominance and to prevent the subordinates from entering regions that are reserved for the queen itself.

=== Division of labor ===
There is a division of labor in communal nests. The dominant female is usually the largest and oldest individual and is sometimes the only reproductive individual in the group. The other females are foragers, bringing food back to the reproductive female. They engage in trophallaxis, feeding nectar to the reproductive female. Most communal nests are simply pairs: one queen that stays in the nest and lays eggs and one worker that leaves the nest to obtain food for herself and the queen. Most females are capable of producing eggs, but they are suppressed by the presence of a dominant queen in their group; if the queen dies, a foraging worker can take her place and lay eggs.

=== Nocturnal adaptations ===
Most bees are diurnal, active during the day. This species and its closest relatives are nocturnal, leaving the nest to forage in the evening. Its adaptations to dim light have been well studied. Like other bees, it has apposition compound eyes, an eye type which is effective in bright light. Specialized anatomical differences in the eyes, such as larger facets, make them 27 times more sensitive to light than those of diurnal bees. Cells in the eyes are especially sensitive to the polarization of light that occurs during dark hours, the twilight time when the bee is active. The brain also has specialized neurons that help it process low light. In addition, new research has shown that they use more than just light sensitivity to be nocturnal. M. genalis actually uses a neural summation of previous experiences in order to improve the reliability of their vision in dim light. They use this data stored in their brains in order to precisely land and fly long distances in large changes of light.

There are a few main benefits to nocturnal behavior, including less competition when foraging, as well as lower risk of predation when foraging. One of the plants that the bee collects pollen from is Pseudobombax septenatum, which has flowers that only open at sunset.

=== Communication through food ===
In M. genalis, the bee exchanges liquid food through a process called trophallaxis, which has indications for social status. While in other species, it is often seen that the flow of exchanged food goes from worker bees to the dominant bees, this is not the case in this unique species. This supports the idea that social behavior is an evolved adaptation, as food is still equally shared in two-bee colonies. It is believed that trophallaxis is an independently adopted behavior of this species, rather than evolutionary behavior.

== Kin selection ==
=== Genetic relatedness in colonies ===
In colonies that exhibit eusocial behavior, meaning there are 2-7 bees rather than the solitary foundress, the other worker bees are usually directly related to the queen. Worker bees can be mated or unmated in the colony and are smaller than the queen bee in size. Even when the foundress rears female offspring, she can still exhibit solitary behavior if the other bees leave to establish their own colonies. Since the foundress has to create an environment for her own nest, all bees of the species experience foraging behavior at some point. Observations have shown that if the queen bee is removed from a social colony, there is a replacement bee that will experience an enlargement of its ovaries, which then exerts its dominance to take over the queen's spot. The replacement bee is usually a female offspring of the queen bee. This replacement bee is capable of being just as successful in reproducing as the original queen, showing that colony status is determined by social competition and is not predetermined. In addition, it is possible that the queen bee can suppress the environment of the daughters in its colony to ensure that they are sterile and are not competition while she is still able to reproduce.

=== Conflict over sex ratio ===
In M. genalis, it has been observed that foundresses practice sex allocation in their offspring. In a foundress's first brood, she rears offspring that are either all males or some males and some females but never only females. Of those foundresses who rear a male-only first brood, there is a possibility that they rear a brood later on with female eggs, but they would not exhibit social behavior. In broods with both females and males, 76% of the females stay past 10 days of birth in their natal nest in order to become a worker bee for their mother and the other 24% find their own nests. Therefore, in this facultatively social species, a foundress who rears a first brood of males only is considered solitary, while a foundress who rears both males and females in its first brood has the ability to be social. The males in the brood usually leave the nest after 4 days of emerging in order to mate. The population sex ratio can therefore be seen as male-biased in both solitary and social colonies.

=== Conflict over parental investment ===
Megalopta genalis is widely studied for its facultatively social behavior, especially in terms of its parental manipulation that demonstrates the effect of environmental factors on development of offspring. Foundresses often manipulate daughters so that they remain worker bees and do not compete with them for mating or dominance. They do this by limiting their larval food intake of pollen, which ensures that the female offspring will be smaller in size as an adult. Although it was previously mentioned that adult size does not necessarily impact fecundity, it does determine signs of dominance. Therefore, it would be in the queen's best interest to keep the female offspring at a smaller size and able to work as foragers in her colony. Among males, there is less variability in food intake at a larval stage even in a shortage of resources.

=== Costs and benefits of sociality ===
Colonies of M. genalis that exhibit social behavior have benefits in terms of predation and survival. When a solitary bee is attacked by a predator, its brood is left orphaned, making it more susceptible to attack and less likely to survive. However, a social colony would have other residents of the nest who can still try to ward off the predators and protect the developing brood. In addition, productivity of the nests increases with social behavior, resulting in more successful egg production. For females that stayed within the natal nest as worker, kin relatedness would be the benefit of staying behind, as well as gaining the advantage of the extra protection. In addition, when the queen bee dies, they have a possibility of replacing her to become the new queen and having a better survival advantage than if they tried to create a solitary colony.

== Interaction with other species ==
=== Parasites ===
Beetles of the species Macrosiagon gracilis have been reported to be a parasite of M. genalis. This species is known to inhabit the same areas as M. genalis, as well as a range outside, which is not accounted for by parasitic behavior yet. The beetle is thought to rear its offspring in the nests of the bee species, allowing them develop to adulthood there. However, this is interesting because the beetle species does not have any known morphological adaptations to nocturnal behavior, and therefore must find the host species using chemical and tactile cues.

=== Defense ===
Ants are a major predator of the species M. genalis. When the ant of the species Ectatomma tuberculatum was exposed to the entrance of Megalopta genalis nest, a bee would try to guard the entrance with its abdomen, and the ant would usually retreat, as it was smaller in size than the bee. When the bee encountered larger ants, such as those of the genus Camponotus, they would bite and sting the ant, until they retreated. If this did not work, female worker bees would push out the ant with its abdomen. In contrast, with smaller ants of the genus Crematogaster they would bite and sting the ant until they died. While social colonies may be beneficial in this defense behavior, it is not necessary because of the initial guarding of the constricted entrance to the nest that a solitary female could do alone.
