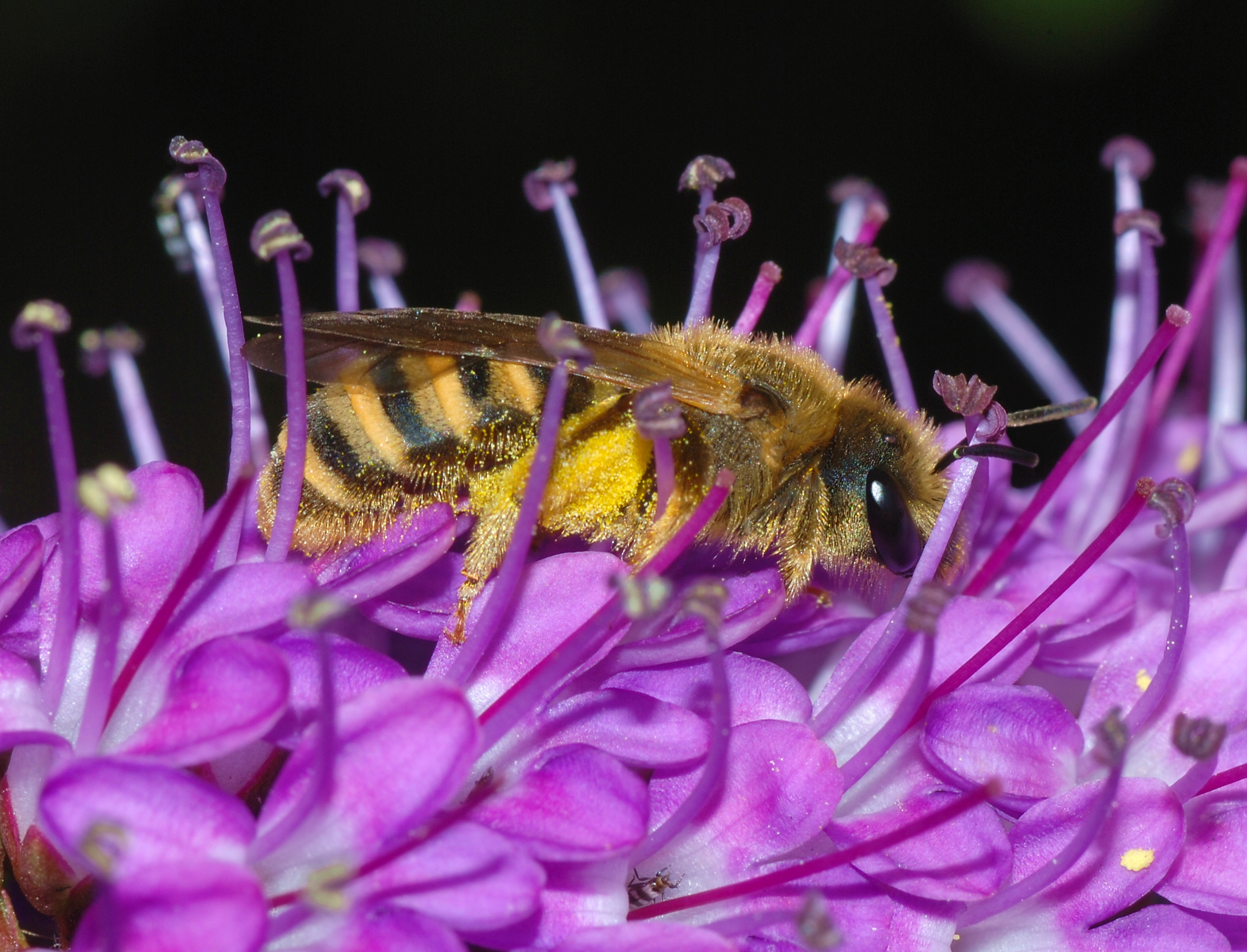
- Halictus scabiosae

Scientific classification
- Kingdom: Animalia
- Phylum: Arthropoda
- Clade: Pancrustacea
- Class: Insecta
- Order: Hymenoptera
- Family: Halictidae
- Subfamily: Halictinae

Tribes
- Augochlorini; Caenohalictini; Halictini; Sphecodini; Thrinchostomini

= Halictinae =

Subfamily of bees

Within the insect order Hymenoptera, the Halictinae are the largest, most diverse, and most recently diverged of the four halictid subfamilies. They comprise over 2400 bee species belonging to the five taxonomic tribes Augochlorini, Thrinchostomini, Caenohalictini, Sphecodini, and Halictini, which some entomologists alternatively organize into the two tribes Augochlorini and Halictini.

The subfamily Halictinae also belongs to the hymenopteran monophyletic clade Aculeata, whose members are characterized by the possession of a modified ovipositor in the form of a venomous sting for predator and prey defense. Including all eusocial and cleptoparasitic Halictidae taxa, these small bees are pollen feeders who mass provision their young and exhibit a broad spectrum of behavioral social polymorphies, ranging from solitary nesting to obligate eusociality. Estimated from the fossil record, eusociality in this subfamily evolved about 20 to 22 million years ago, which is relatively recent in comparison with other inferred eusociality origins. Thus, the Halictinae are believed to model the primitive eusociality of advanced eusocial hymenopterans. Because of their polymorphic sociality and recently evolved eusociality, the Halictinae are valuable to the study of social evolution.

== Tribes ==
=== Augochlorini ===
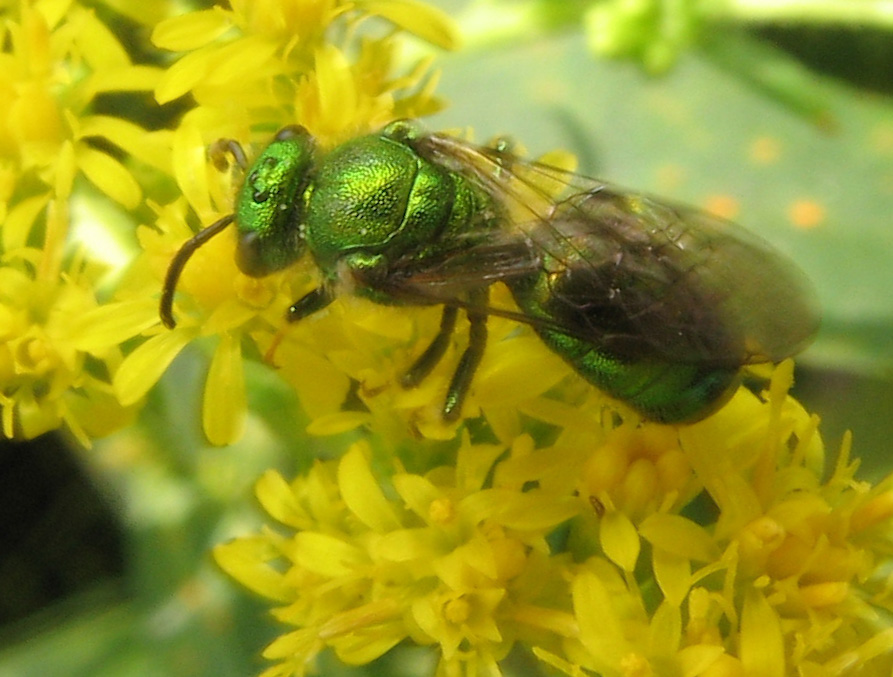
Augochloropsis metallica male

The roughly 250 species belonging to the tribe Augochlorini exist only in the New World, mainly inhabiting the Neotropics and some areas of North America. Augochlorini sociality, though not well understood, is significantly polymorphic across its range, as well as between and within species and genera. Facultative eusociality has been observed in genera such as Augochloropsis and Megalopta, and cleptoparasitism has recently developed separately in the three augochlorine genera and subgenera Temnosoma, Megalopta (Noctoraptor), and Megommation (Cleptommation).

=== Thrinchostomini ===
The two genera Thrinchostoma and Parathrincostoma comprise the tribe Thrinchostomini. These insects are large, nonmetallic bees residing in Madagascar and the African and Asia tropics. Twelve of the 56 Thrinchostoma species are native to Madagascar and exhibit some host-plant specificity. Parathrincostoma species, two of which are native to Madagascar, are likely cleptoparasites, indicated by a lack of pollen-collecting structures in their female morphology. Though evidence of sociality and nesting biology is limited, observed populations in southern Africa are believed to be solitary.

=== Caenohalictini ===
Species of the tribe Caenohalictini inhabit areas in only the New World and are similar in physical appearance to Augochlorini. Caenohalictine species practice either solitary or communal nesting. Some genera are nocturnal.

=== Sphecodini ===
The tribe Sphecodini contains five cleptoparasitic genera, Austrosphecodes, Eupetersia, Microsphecodes, Ptilocleptis, and Sphecodes. Species of the tribe oviposit their eggs onto or near the pollen stores of their hosts' nests. These cleptoparasitic bees can be host generalists or specialists. Some species exhibit especially aggressive parasitism, attacking and sometimes killing solitary or social nest host female(s) before ovipositing eggs into pollen-provisioned host cells. Such parasites inhabit every continent. Some taxonomists regard it as part of the tribe Halictini.

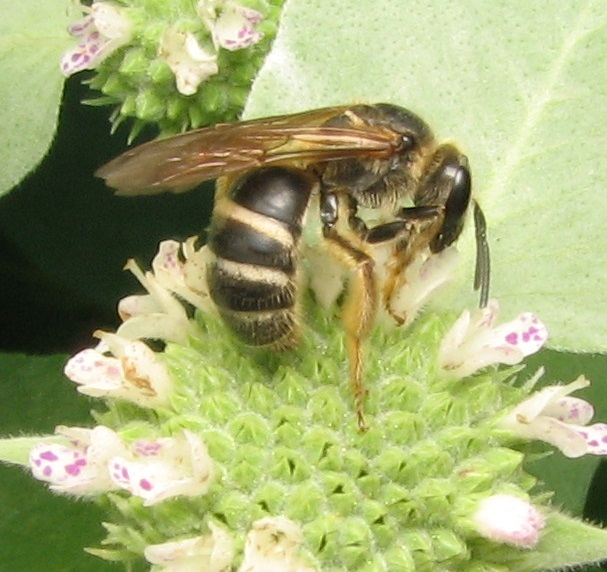
Lasioglossum bee on mountain mint

=== Halictini ===
Assigned more than 2000 described species, the Halictini are the largest tribe of halictid bees, including considerable behavioral diversity. Lasioglossum, Mexalictus, and Patellapis sensu lato are notable genera. Most species belong to the genus Lasioglossum, which encompasses a variety of nocturnal and diurnal, socially parasitic, solitary, eusocial, and communal bees. Lasioglossum species are distinguished by a weakened outer wing venation, while species of Mexalictus resemble Lasioglossum in body shape, but possess strong wing venation. Mexalictus includes six described species of rare bees observed in humid areas of high elevation ranging from southeast Arizona to northern Guatemala. The social behavior of Mexalictus species is unknown. Recent observational data of Patellapis s. l. suggest the genus practices communal nesting, with as many as eight females sharing a nest. Most Patellapis s. l. species inhabit southern Africa and Madagascar, though species are also found in tropical Asia and northern Australia.

== Social diversity ==
A great diversity of social systems exists between and within halictine species. These discrepancies in social phenologies occur both locally and across geographic locations. The variety of colony organizations expressed by halictine species is represented along a gradient ranging from solitary nesting to obligate eusociality.

=== Eusociality ===
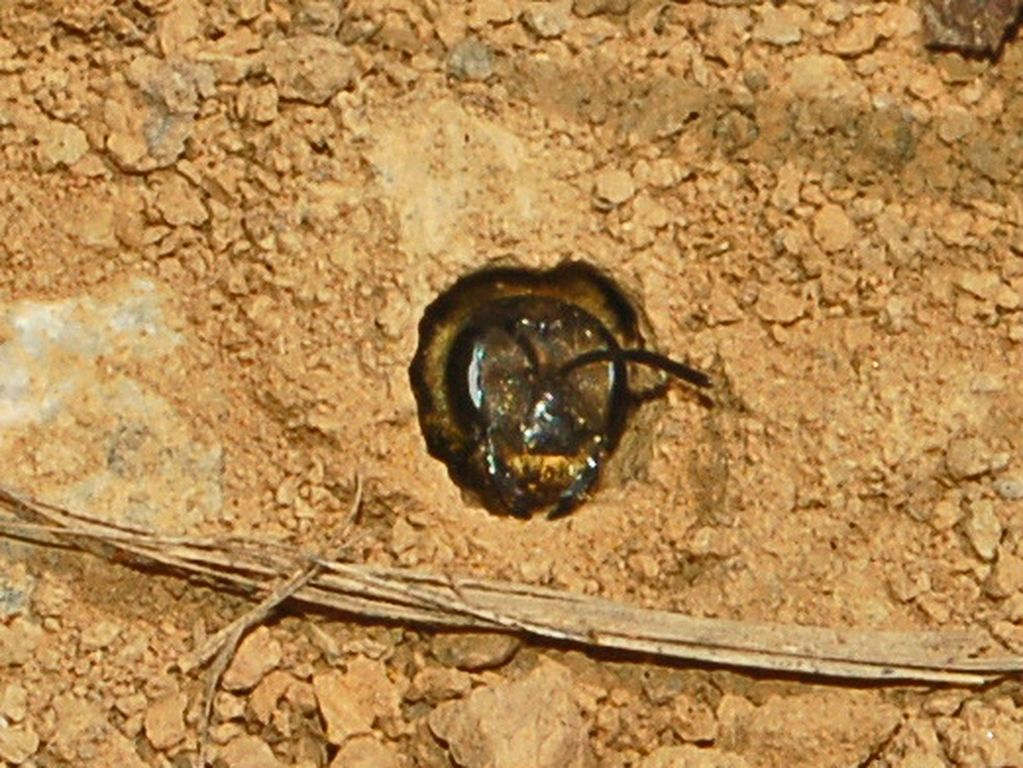
Female Halictus scabiosae guarding the entrance of the nest

Eusocial behavior is associated with cooperative nesting and brood care, an overlap in adult generations, and a division of social roles, marked by intracolony reproductive hierarchies. The social roles of a eusocial colony are distributed into castes that include the reproductive queen(s), female workers which forage for pollen and care for the brood and nest, and brood composed of potential workers and reproductive males and gyne. In the Halictinae, one or more females found a colony site, and initiate its development, first producing brood of workers to forage for resources and care for future offspring followed by brood of males and gynes to mate and propagate the nest's genes. A mated gyne is a potential queen that will either disperse to a new nest, succeed to the position of the former nest queen, or suffer subordination or harm by the current queen.

In a mating season, a eusocial halictine queen usually lays multiple broods, with earlier broods composed of dominantly female workers and later broods of reproductive males and gynes. A eusocial queen monopolizes the reproductive capacity within a nest, preventing reproduction of colony workers. Overlapping of adult generations importantly enables worker daughters to contribute to the rearing of later broods. However, eusociality also exists within generations with no adult overlap. As a result of the heavy work load requirement of nest building and repeated food provisioning in eusocial colonies, nest sharing also saves time, energy, and natural resources.

When multiple females found a colony, a dominant queen can subordinate another foundress. However, such foundresses may remain in the colony, likely because of the potential to succeed to the queen caste if the current queen dies or loses her position. Also, subordinate females may find an opportunity to lay their own eggs in the nest.

The large colony size of eusocial insects elicits both costs and benefits. Increased group size is often correlated with increased predator attraction. However, in appropriate situations, aggregations of individuals can provide more effective predator defense. Under situations of low parasite and predator threat as well as plentiful territory and resource availability, the risk of attracting a predator from aggregating is greater than the possible benefits of collaborative nesting and reproductive rearing. When parasite and predator threats are high and territory and resources are limited, a greater number of individual workers may improve parental care of offspring. For example, increased numbers of workers in a colony increase the effectiveness of nest defenses such as stinging enemies and blocking nest entrances. Possession of venomous stinger in the Halictinae were likely beneficial in the subfamily's evolution of eusociality by providing a thwart to the increased predator attention caused by group living. Also a benefit of cooperative nesting, the requirement for foraging away from the nest does not necessitate temporary nest abandonment when a surplus of females are available to stay behind in the nest, reducing risks of brood predation.

=== Solitary nesting ===
In solitary nesting, a single reproductive female mates, lays and independently cares for her personal brood of reproductive males and females. Young females mature and then disperse away from the colony to establish their own nest and mate. Solitary nests less easily attract predator and parasite attention. However, they must independently forage for pollen provisions and protect their nest and brood.

=== Obligate eusociality ===
Obligate eusociality describes species that exhibit eusociality across all local, geographic, and temporal populations. Such species are known to exist within seven halictine genera: Halictus (Halictus), Halictus (Seladonia), Lasioglossum (Evylaeus), Lasioglossum (Dialictus), Augochlora, Augochlorella, Augochloropsis. Though eusociality is always expressed, obligately eusocial species still exhibit social diversity in degrees of eusociality.

=== Facultative eusociality ===
Facultative eusociality, also known as facultative solitary, describes species or populations in which both solitary and eusocial behavior are expressed. Eusociality evolved independently from multiple lineages of solitary Hymenoptera. However, some facultative eusocial species demonstrate a reversion from eusociality back to solitary nesting.

=== Communal nesting ===
Communal nesting is less common than eusocial nesting. Bees exhibiting communal nesting share a common nest or nest component, but each female in a communal nest cares for and raises her brood independently; there is no cooperation, and no division of labor. It was previously thought that communal nesting acted as a transitional step from solitary behavior to eusociality, but the fact that solitary, communal, and eusocial strategies exist separately in Halictus sexcinctus does not support this theory. Phylogenetic data from this species suggests that communal behavior may actually serve as a transitional step between eusociality and an evolutionary reversion back to solitary nesting.

=== Perennial eusociality ===
Lasioglossum marginatum is the only species known to exhibit perennial eusociality. This species' colonies produce a single brood of workers for three to four years and then produce a brood of males and gynes in its final breeding season. Before the end of the breeding season, males disperse to gyne-producing nests to mate. Males introduced into nonfinal-year nests mate with workers, and workers disperse to found new nests. Queens are the same size as workers, but experience a lifespan of four to five years, while workers live one year.

== Evolution of eusociality ==
To hypothesize origins and losses of social behavior in halictine species, phylogenies of social taxa are critical. Phylogenies constructed from fossil evidence dating demonstrate numerous reversions within the Halictidae to solitary nesting. Morphological data were employed in the 1960s to create a phylogeny suggesting the behavioral reversion from eusociality to solitary nesting in the genera Augochlora and Augochlorella. In mapping other taxonomic relationships, however, morphological data have been troublesome. DNA sequence-based phylogenies have been the most enlightening of halictine relationships. The most recent molecular evidence suggests three to four independent origins of eusociality and frequent reversions from eusociality to solitary nesting.

== Determinants of sociality ==
=== Queen-worker roles and reproductive skew ===
Eusocial queens have large bodies, are nest foundresses, monopolize nest oviposition, and raise brood with the help of less or non-reproductive female workers. These workers are daughters of the queen, have small bodies, help raise younger nest brood primarily produced by the queen. Workers are capable of laying gyne or male eggs and occasionally do so, limited by the queen's physical control. A queen can direct the evolution and maintenance of nonreproductive castes of offspring through parental manipulation with the use of pheromones or assertion of behavioral dominance. Queens can establish dominance by striking workers with her head, blocking workers' travel through nest passageways, and coaxing workers more deeply into the nest. A queen's successful reproductive monopolization is contingent on her ability to control the colony's workers and on the size of the worker population. An excess of workers may be unmanageable for a queen and lead to worker reproduction.

When a queen is responsible for the majority of the offspring her nest produces, her nest exhibits a high reproductive skew between the queen and worker castes. A low reproductive skew occurs when a nest possesses little deviation between queen and worker reproductive success. Strong eusociality is measured by a high reproductive skew, and the influence of various factors on this skew determines a colony's expressed sociality.

=== Environmental factors ===
Latitudinal, altitudinal, and local variation have been partially ascribed to environmental influences such as flowering season length, temperature, nesting substrate availability, and risk of predation or parasitism. For eusociality to be expressed, the summer breeding season must provide time for consecutive production of both worker and reproductive broods. Thus, obligately eusocial species are restricted to environments characterized by long breeding seasons. Communal and solitary species are usually limited to short breeding seasons, and facultative eusocial species are represented in more various environments.

In warmer climates with longer breeding seasons, colonies have longer cycles and are larger in size, requiring the queen(s) to interact with more worker members. This result explains latitudinal gradients of obligate eusociality in Halictus ligatus, Halictus rubicundus, and Lasioglossum malachurum. These species exhibit, to some extent, as the colony size increases, queens' ability to control their workers and monopolize colony reproduction decreases, reducing the reproductive skew and degree of eusociality. However, in L. malachrum, this trend is only observed in northern populations.

In Europe, northern colonies of L. malachurum produce a single worker brood, followed by a gyne brood. However, southern European colonies produce more broods as a result of longer breeding seasons. Queens in these colonies rarely survive to the final, gyne-producing broods, increasing worker mating potential and decreasing queen monopolization of a reproduction in a mating season. A study of L. malachurum in southern Greece demonstrated the local populations' degree of eusociality varied among colonies and years, a possible result of queen survival differences during breeding seasons. Additionally, the study revealed the colony social organization of L. malachurum to vary geographically. In comparison to those in northern Greece, southern Greek populations exhibited larger colony sizes, increased ovarian development, decreased worker mating, and a smaller number of worker-sized queens.

=== Behavioral plasticity ===
Contributing to the vast halictine social diversity, adult female halictines possess the capacity to express any reproductive role their species exhibits and can adjust their social behavior in response to behavioral interactions within their nest and environmental conditions. The degree of this social plasticity differs among halictine species and populations, further contributing to the subfamily's great inter- and intraspecific variation.

Megalopta genalis, a facultative eusocial halictine, has been observed to primarily exhibit solitary nesting while possessing the capacity for cohabitation and social dominance. These eusocial behaviors are expressed in response to changes in local environments.

Reversions to solitary behavior in some facultative eusocial halictine species are associated with environmental conditions that cause removal of worker broods from eusocial colonies. Within some local populations, eusocial nests and reversions to solitary nests coexist, possibly reflecting an individual queen's control of colony adaptation to environmental conditions through her decision of brood types produced.

=== Genetics ===
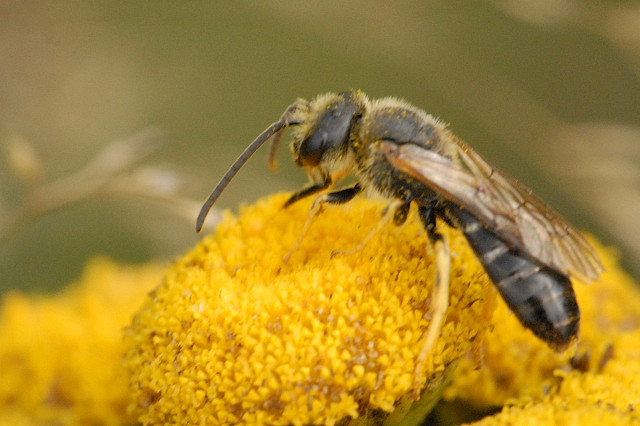
Halictus rubicundus

In combination with environmental conditions, a halictine population's genetic make-up influences its expressed sociality. An individual halictine bee's repertoire of accessible social behaviors is determined by its specific genetic make-up.

The phylogeographic distribution of Halictus rubicundus, a socially polymorphic halictine, supports the importance of genetics in expressed sociality. Within its range, H. rubicundus eusocial populations exist in areas with typically longer growing seasons, while solitary populations inhabit areas with shorter growing seasons. This geographical distribution suggests social determination by environmental factors. However, DNA sequence-based phylogenetic analysis revealed genetic structure across H. rubicundus populations. Social and solitary H. rubicundus populations in North America belong to distinct evolutionary lineages, and some populations are more closely related to populations with which they share social behavior than to geographically nearer populations.

Ultimately, a halictine colony's social organization is influenced by the interaction between its members' genotype, social plasticity, intracolony relationships, and environmental conditions. The mechanisms by which these factors interact in Halictinae are not currently well understood. However, the vastness of halictine social diversity, within and between species, provides ample opportunities for study.
