= Chlerogas =

Scientific classification
- Domain: Eukaryota
- Kingdom: Animalia
- Phylum: Arthropoda
- Class: Insecta
- Order: Hymenoptera
- Family: Halictidae
- Genus: Chlerogas; Vachal, 1904

Genus of bees

Chlerogas is a genus of bees belonging to the family Halictidae.

The species of this genus are found in South America.

Species:

- Chlerogas araguaensis Brooks & Engel, 1999
- Chlerogas aterrimus Engel, 2010
- Chlerogas boliviensis Brooks & Engel, 1999
- Chlerogas chlerogas (Vachal, 1904)
- Chlerogas columbiensis Brooks & Engel, 1999
- Chlerogas cooperi Engel, Oliveira & Smith-Pardo, 2006
- Chlerogas cyaneus Brooks & Engel, 1999
- Chlerogas hirsutipennis Cockerell, 1919
- Chlerogas nephos Brooks & Engel, 1999
- Chlerogas tatamaensis Engel & Gonzalez, 2009
- Chlerogas tiara Brooks & Engel, 1999
- Chlerogas townesi Brooks & Engel, 1999
