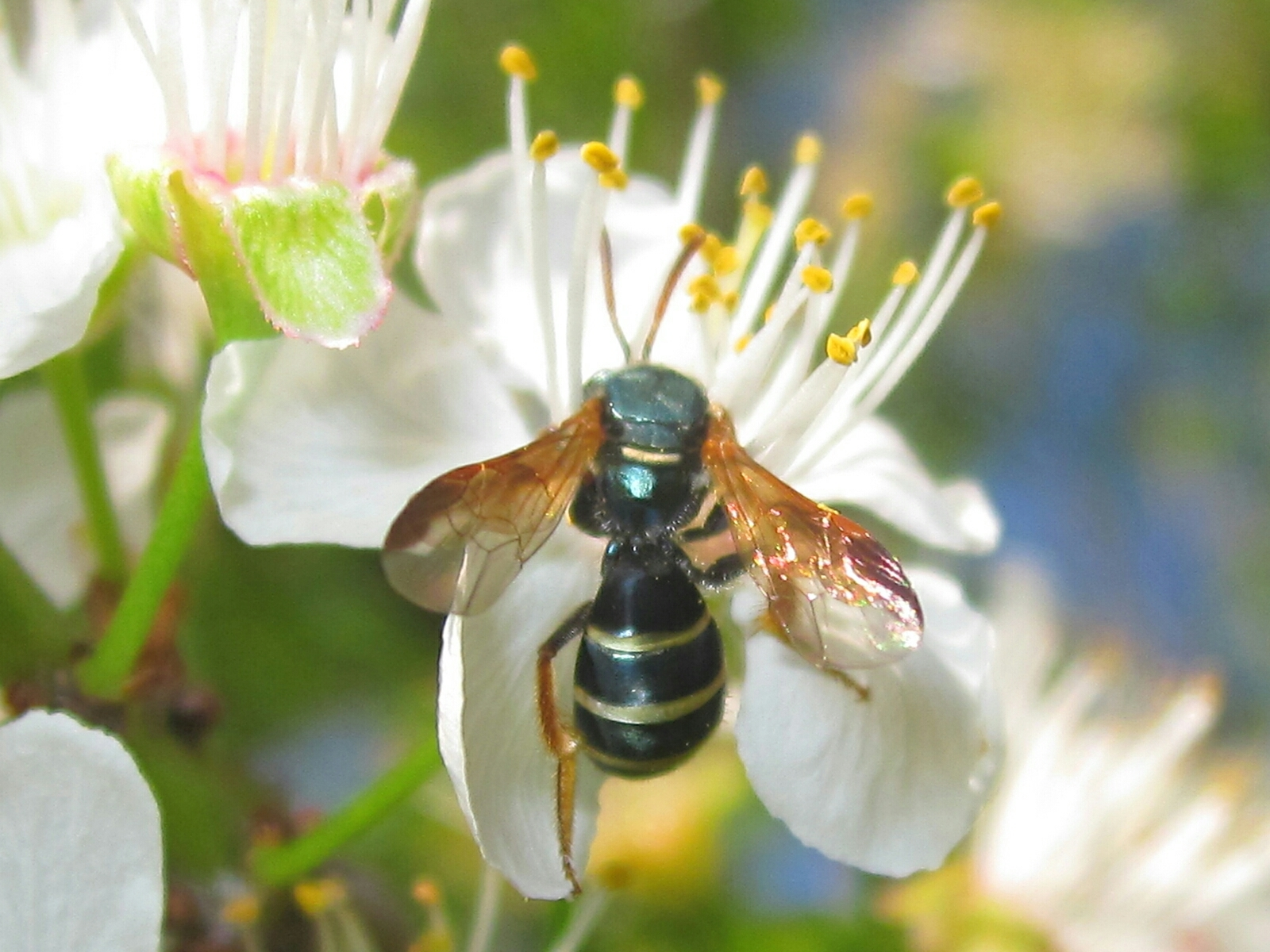
- Corynura chilensis

Scientific classification
- Kingdom: Animalia
- Phylum: Arthropoda
- Class: Insecta
- Order: Hymenoptera
- Family: Halictidae
- Genus: Corynura; Spinola, 1851

= Corynura =

Genus of bees

Corynura is a genus of bees belonging to the family Halictidae.

The species of this genus are found in South America.

Species:

- Corynura ampliata (Alfken, 1913)
- Corynura analis (Herbst, 1924)
- Corynura apicata (Sichel, 1867)
- Corynura atrovirens (Herbst, 1924)
- Corynura aureoviridis
- Corynura bruchiana (Schrottky, 1908)
- Corynura callicladura (Cockerell, 1918)
- Corynura chilensis (Spinola, 1851)
- Corynura chiloeensis (Cockerell, 1918)
- Corynura chloris (Spinola, 1851)
- Corynura chloromelas (Alfken, 1913)
- Corynura corinogaster (Spinola, 1851)
- Corynura cristata (Smith, 1853)
- Corynura herbsti (Alfken, 1913)
- Corynura heterochlora Alfken, 1926
- Corynura lepida Alfken, 1926
- Corynura melanoclada (Cockerell, 1918)
- Corynura moscosensis González-Vaquero, 2017
- Corynura patagonica (Cockerell, 1919)
- Corynura prothysteres (Vachal, 1904)
- Corynura rubella (Haliday, 1836)
- Corynura spadicidiventris Alfken, 1916
