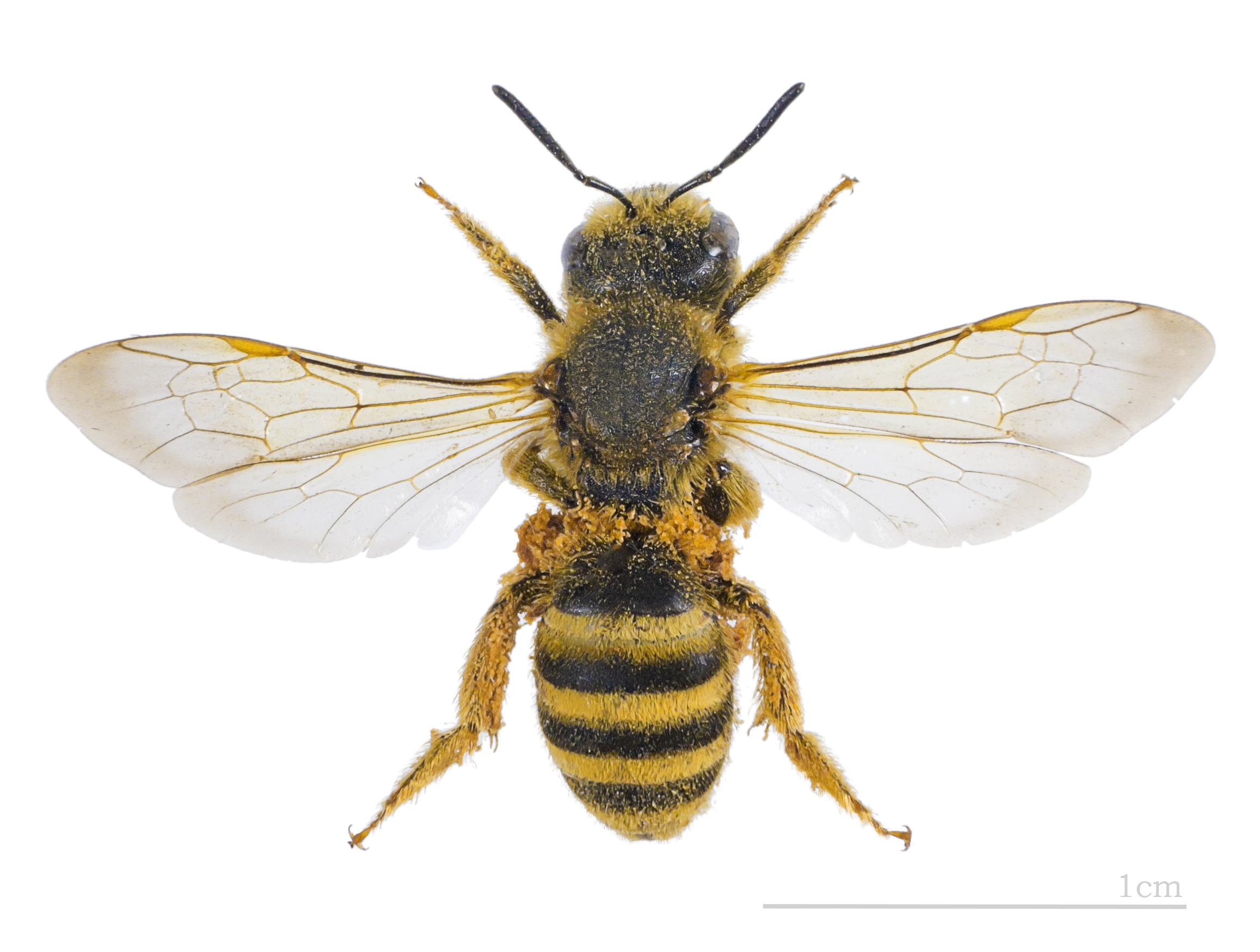
- Female, museum specimen

Scientific classification
- Kingdom: Animalia
- Phylum: Arthropoda
- Class: Insecta
- Order: Hymenoptera
- Family: Halictidae
- Genus: Halictus
- Species: H. scabiosae

Binomial name
- Halictus scabiosae (Rossi, 1790)

Synonyms
- Apis scabiosae Rossi, 1790

= Halictus scabiosae =

Species of bee

Halictus scabiosae, the great banded furrow-bee, is a species of bee in the family Halictidae, the sweat bees.

== Distribution ==
This species is present in most of Europe and in North Africa.

== Description ==
The abdomen is long, with yellowish stripes and a double band on tergites two and three. The legs are yellow and antennae are entirely black and curved at the apex. Males are very elongated and have a whitish posterior band on segments two-six of the abdomen, while the females show basal hair yellowish-beige bands on tergites two-four.

This species looks very similar to a closely related species, Halictus sexcinctus, and thus the two can be easily confused. These two species can be distinguished from one another in that males of H. sexcinctus have longer, reddish antennae, and females lack said basal hair bands.

== Biology ==
These mining bees nest on the ground in hardened paths. Normally they dig vertical tunnels in the ground, with a circular entrance surrounded by a cone of earth. In most cases a single female of Halictus scabiosae use a single nest, but sometimes they have a primitive social organization, with multiple females reproducing in a common nest. This primitive species can also be eusocial, with smaller females acting as workers. They are used to nest at a particular site in many colonies.

This species may have several generations per year. Females usually can be found in April after hibernation, while males and new females appear in July. These bees feed on nectar and pollen of various flowers, especially on Asteraceae species.

== Gallery ==
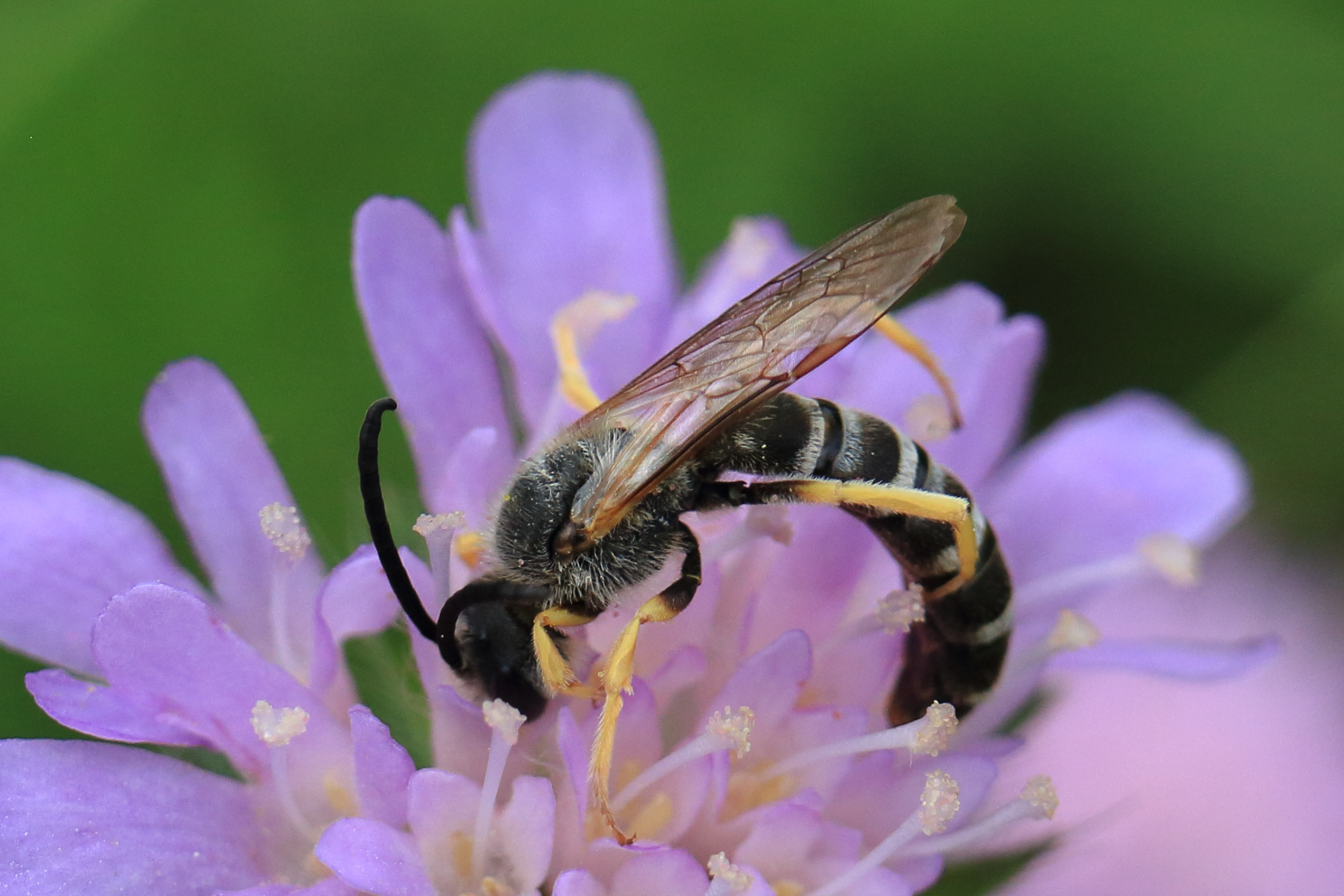
Male

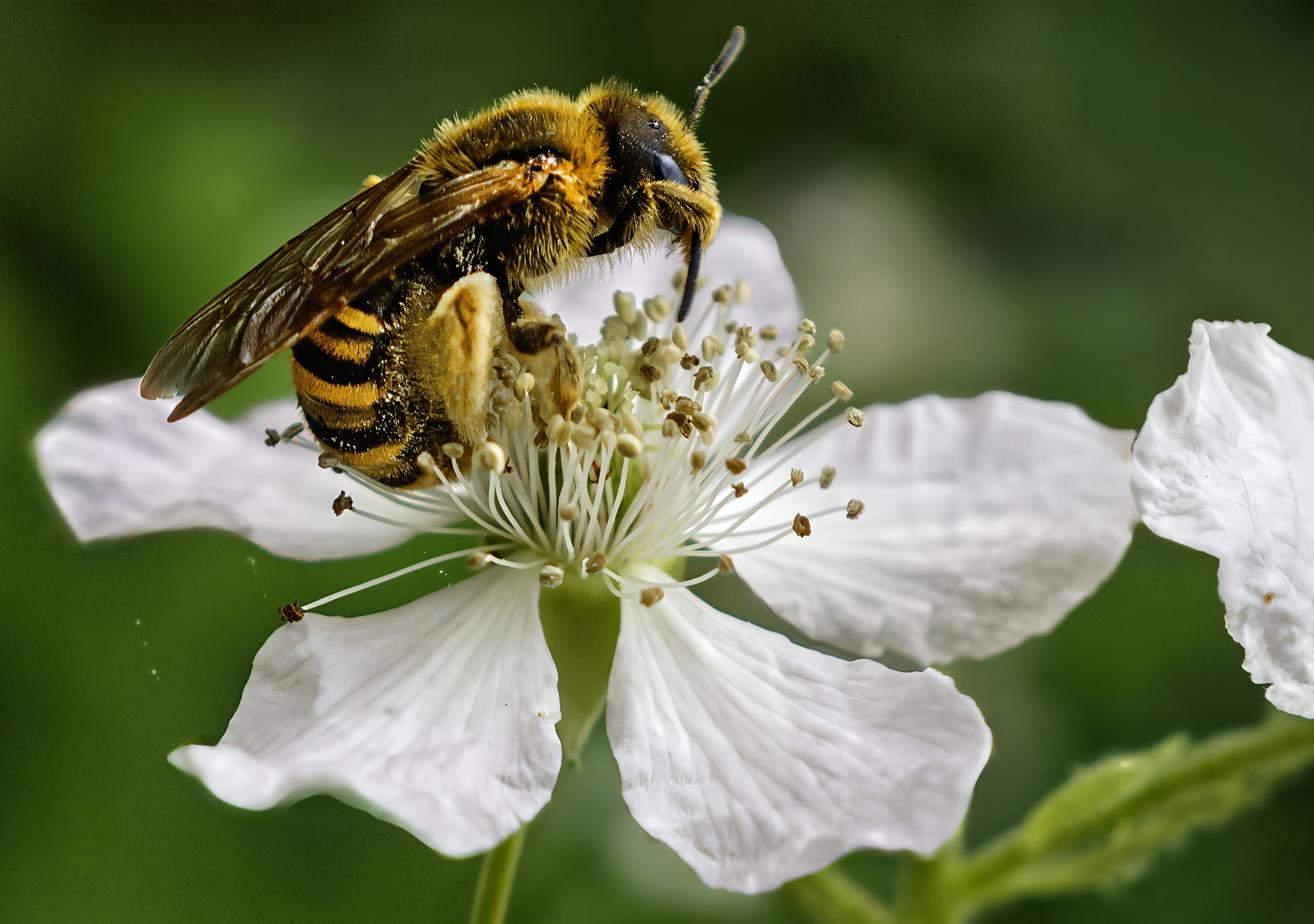
Female

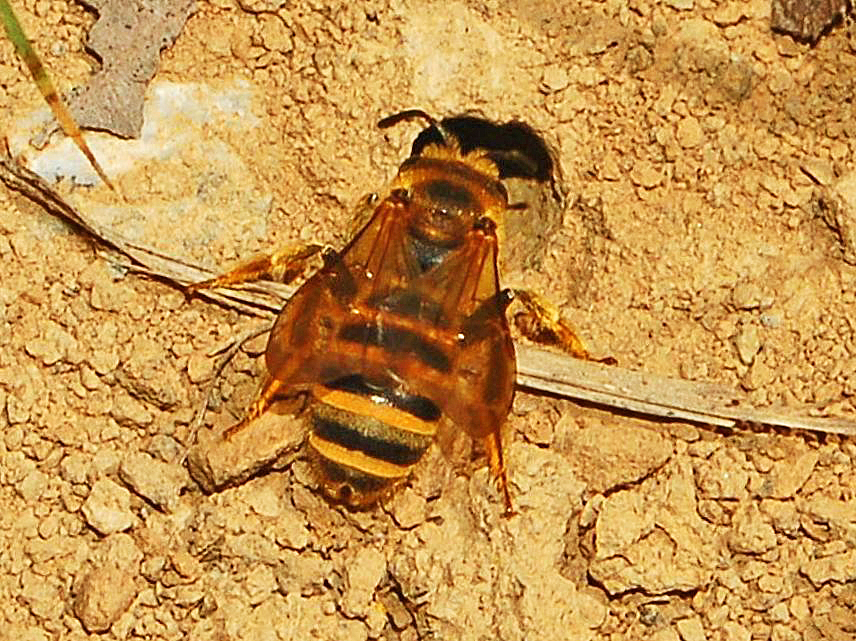
Female that enters the nest

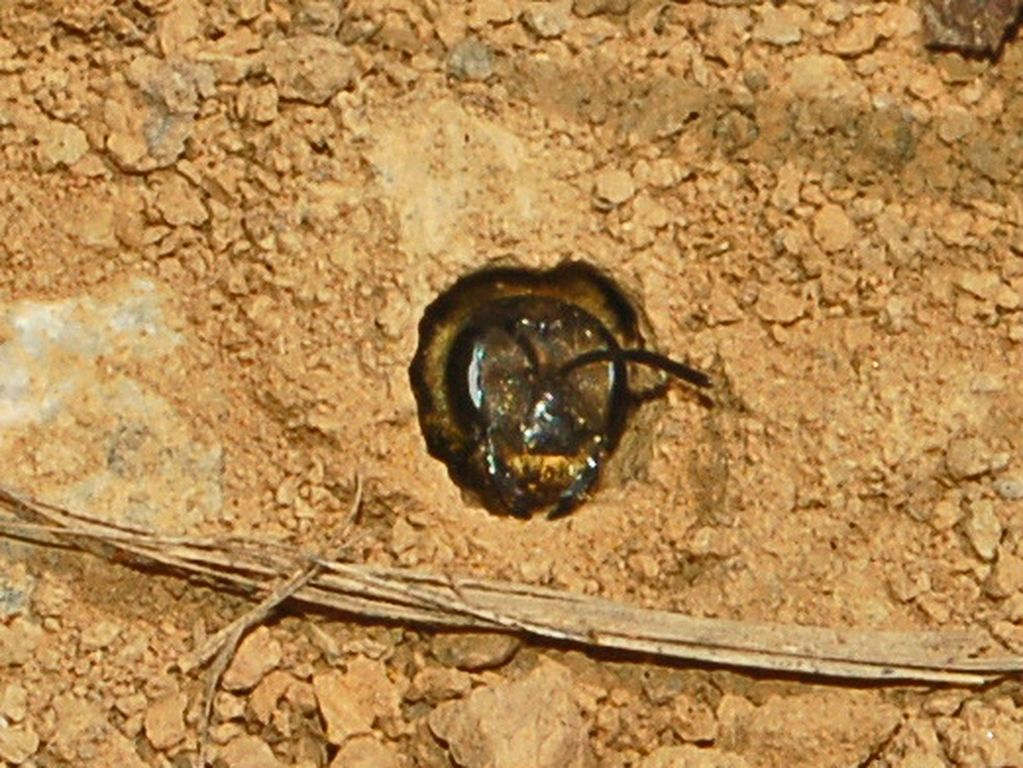
Female guarding the entrance of the nest
