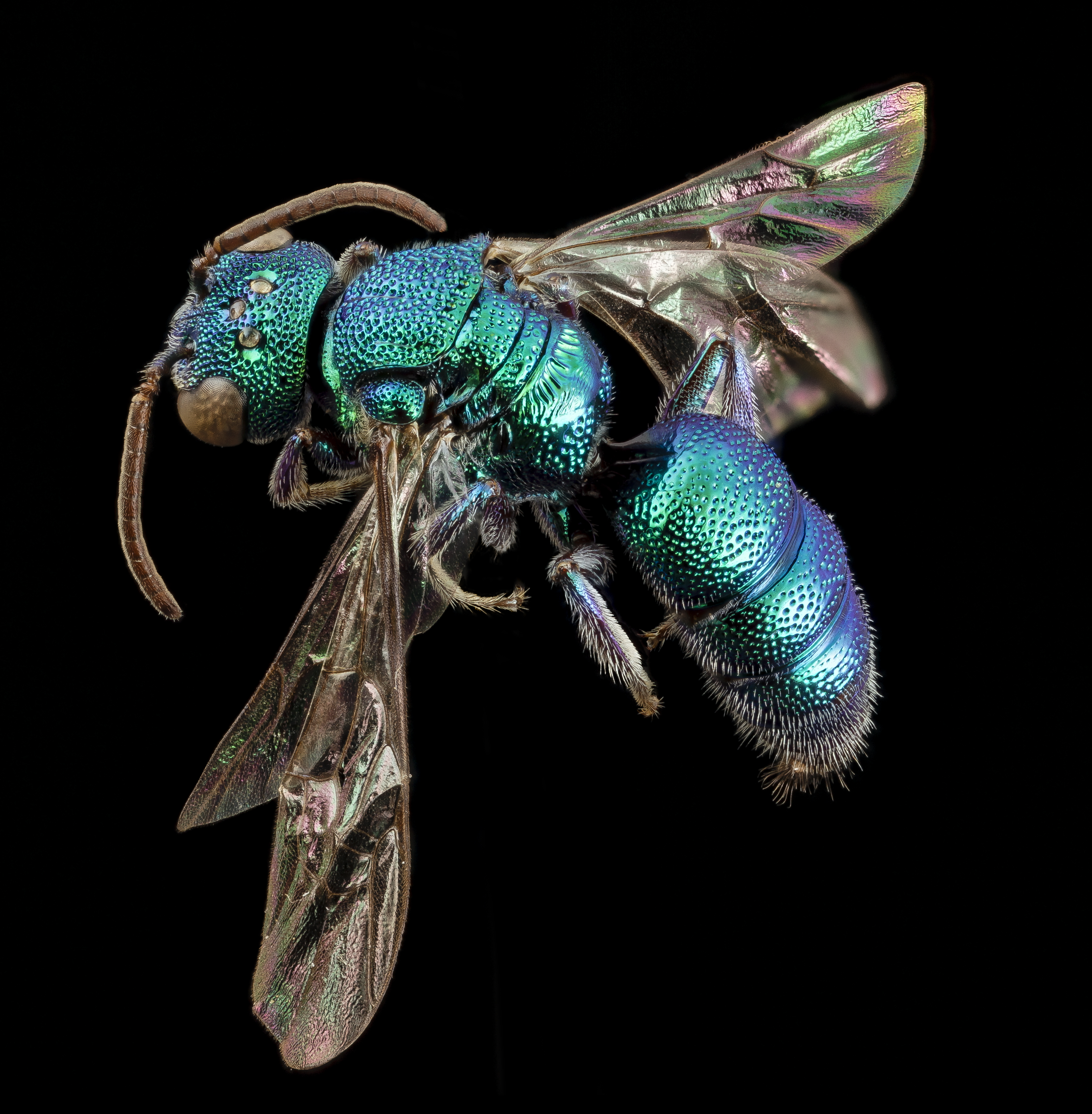

Scientific classification
- Kingdom: Animalia
- Phylum: Arthropoda
- Class: Insecta
- Order: Hymenoptera
- Family: Halictidae
- Genus: Temnosoma; Smith, 1853

= Temnosoma =

Genus of bees

Temnosoma is a genus of bees belonging to the family Halictidae.

The species of this genus are found in Central and South America.

Species:

- Temnosoma aeruginosum Smith, 1879
- Temnosoma fulvipes Friese, 1924
- Temnosoma laevigatum Smith, 1879
- Temnosoma malachisis Friese, 1924
- Temnosoma metallicum Smith, 1853
- Temnosoma smaragdinum Smith, 1879
- Temnosoma sphaerocephalum (Schrottky, 1909)
