= Megaloptidia =

Scientific classification
- Kingdom: Animalia
- Phylum: Arthropoda
- Class: Insecta
- Order: Hymenoptera
- Family: Halictidae
- Genus: Megaloptidia; Cockerell, 1900

Genus of bees

Megaloptidia is a genus of bees belonging to the family Halictidae.

The species of this genus are found in South America.

Species:

- Megaloptidia contradicta (Cockerell, 1900)
- Megaloptidia nocturna (Friese, 1926)
- Megaloptidia saulensis Engel & Brooks, 1998
