= Megommation =

Scientific classification
- Domain: Eukaryota
- Kingdom: Animalia
- Phylum: Arthropoda
- Class: Insecta
- Order: Hymenoptera
- Family: Halictidae
- Genus: Megommation; Moure, 1943

Genus of bees

Megommation is a genus of bees belonging to the family Halictidae.

The species of this genus are found in South America.

Species:

- Megommation amazonicum
- Megommation eickworti Engel, Brooks & Yanega, 1997
- Megommation festivagum (Dalla Torre, 1896)
- Megommation insigne (Smith, 1853)
- Megommation minutum (Friese, 1926)
- Megommation ogilviei (Cockerell, 1930)
