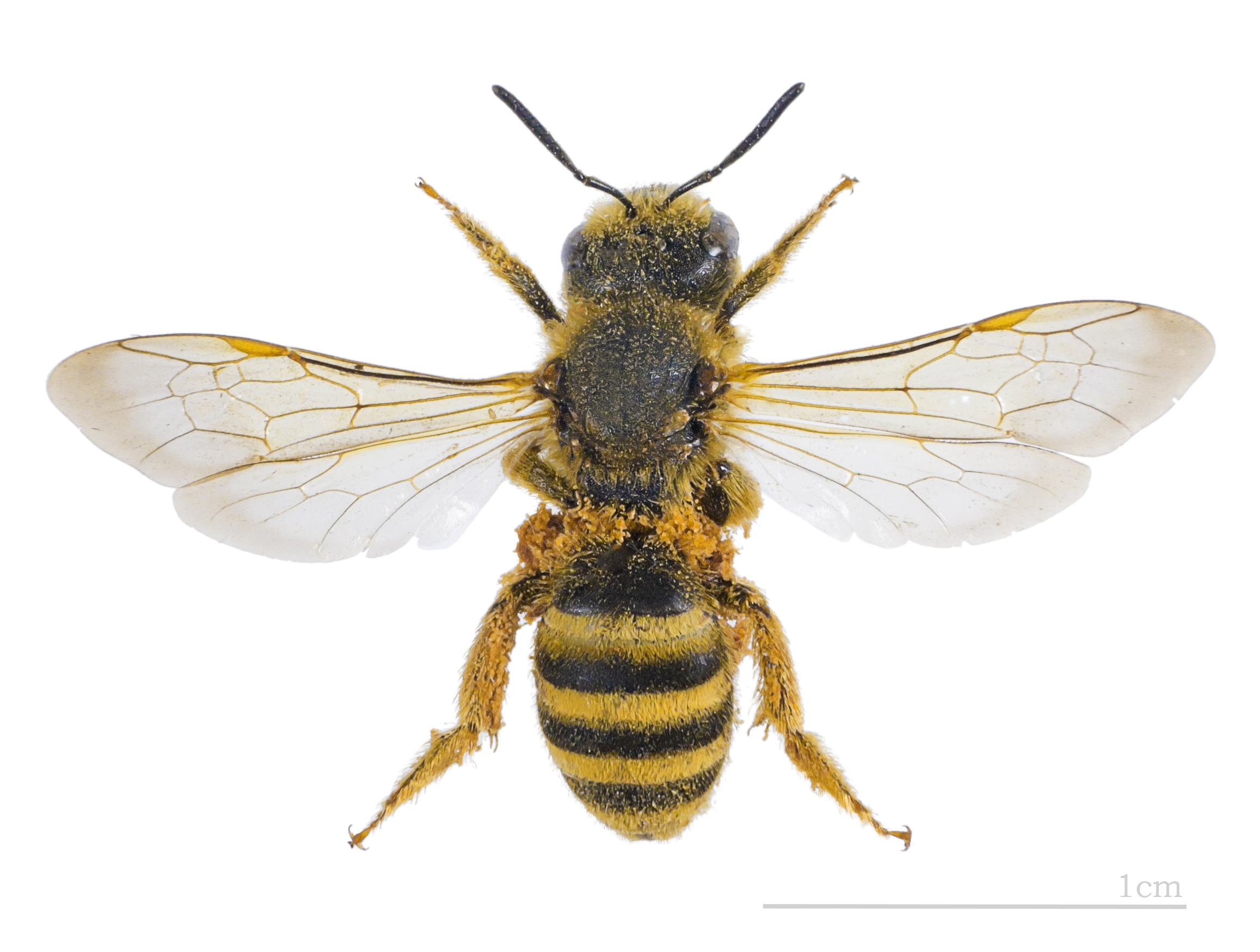
- Halictus scabiosae - MHNT

Scientific classification
- Kingdom: Animalia
- Phylum: Arthropoda
- Class: Insecta
- Order: Hymenoptera
- Clade: Anthophila
- Family: Halictidae; Thomson, 1869, nom. protect.

Subfamilies
- Halictinae; Nomiinae; Nomioidinae; Rophitinae

= Halictidae =

Family of bees

Halictidae is the second-largest family of bees (clade Anthophila) with nearly 4,500 species. They are commonly called sweat bees (especially the smaller species), as they are often attracted to perspiration. Halictid species are an extremely diverse group that can vary greatly in appearance. These bees occur all over the world and are found on every continent except Antarctica. Usually dark-colored (frequently brown or black) and often metallic, halictids are found in various sizes, colors and patterns. Several species are all or partly green and a few are red, purple, or blue. A number of them have yellow markings, especially the males, which commonly have yellow faces, a pattern widespread among the various families of bees. The family is one of many with short tongues and is best distinguished by the arcuate (strongly curved) basal vein found on the wing. Females in this family tend to be larger than the males. They are the group for which the term eusocial was coined by entomologist Suzanne Batra.

== Ecology ==
Most halictids nest in the ground, often in habitats like clay soil and river banks, though a few nest in wood. They mass-provision their young; a mass of pollen and nectar is formed inside a waterproof cell, an egg laid upon it, and the cell sealed off, so the larva is given all of its food at one time, as opposed to "progressive provisioning", where a larva is fed repeatedly as it grows, as in honey bees. Some species line their tunnels with lactone secretions to help workers return to the nest. It is thought that each individual bee has its own unique chemical signature. All species (except for kleptoparasites) are pollen feeders and may be important pollinators.

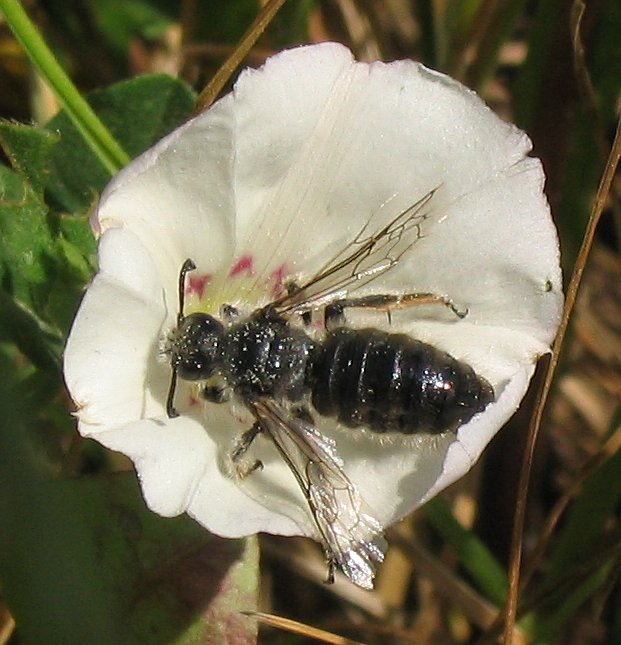
Systropha planidens, a specialist pollinator of Convolvulus

=== Eusociality ===
Many species in the Halictidae are eusocial at least in part, such as Lasioglossum malachurum, with fairly well-defined queen and worker castes (though not the same as the caste system in honey bees), and certain manifestations of their social behavior appear to be facultative in various lineages. The first group of offspring continues to build and protect the nest as well as gather food for a new brood of larvae. An impressive variety of social and nesting behaviors are exhibited by halictids including solitary, communal, semi-social and primitively eusocial. Different biotic and abiotic factors can even affect these behaviors such as floral resources, location, altitude, season, and climate.

Those species which do not have a permanent, rigid, division of labor, such as Lasioglossum zephyrus or Halictus rubicundus, are considered primitively eusocial. Another example of a primitive eusocial bee species from this family is Halictus ligatus, for which aggression is one of the most influential behavioral attitudes for establishing hierarchy and social organization within the colony. Primitively eusocial species such as these provide insight into the early evolution of eusociality. Halictus sexcinctus, which exhibits social, communal, and eusocial organization, provides insight into the evolutionary reversal of eusociality. Phylogenetic data from this species suggests that a communal strategy serves as a transitional step between eusociality and a reversion back to solitary nesting.

=== Kleptoparasitism ===
Several genera and species of halictids are kleptoparasites of other bees (mostly other halictids or bees of similar size). The behavior has evolved at least nine times independently within the family. The most well-known and common are species in the genus Sphecodes, which are somewhat wasp-like in appearance (often shining black with blood-red abdomen- German: Blutbienen - usually 4–9 mm in body length); the female Sphecodes enters the cell with the provision mass, eats the host egg, and lays an egg of her own in its place.

=== "Nocturnal" species ===
Halictidae is one of the four bee families that contain some crepuscular species; these halictids are active only at dusk or in the early evening, so are technically considered "vespertine" (e.g. in the subgenus Sphecodogastra of Lasioglossum), or sometimes truly nocturnal (e.g. in the genus Megalopta, such as the species M. genalis). These bees, as is typical in such cases, have greatly enlarged ocelli. The other families with some crepuscular species are Andrenidae, Colletidae, and Apidae.

== Economic importance ==
Some Halictids are important in the pollination of crops. Among these are the alkali bee, Lasioglossum vierecki and Lasioglossum leucozonium. While some halictid species are oligoleges (e.g., Rophites algirus, which only visits the flowers of hedgenettle plants.), most are generalists making them potentially valuable overall pollinators.

== Stinging ==
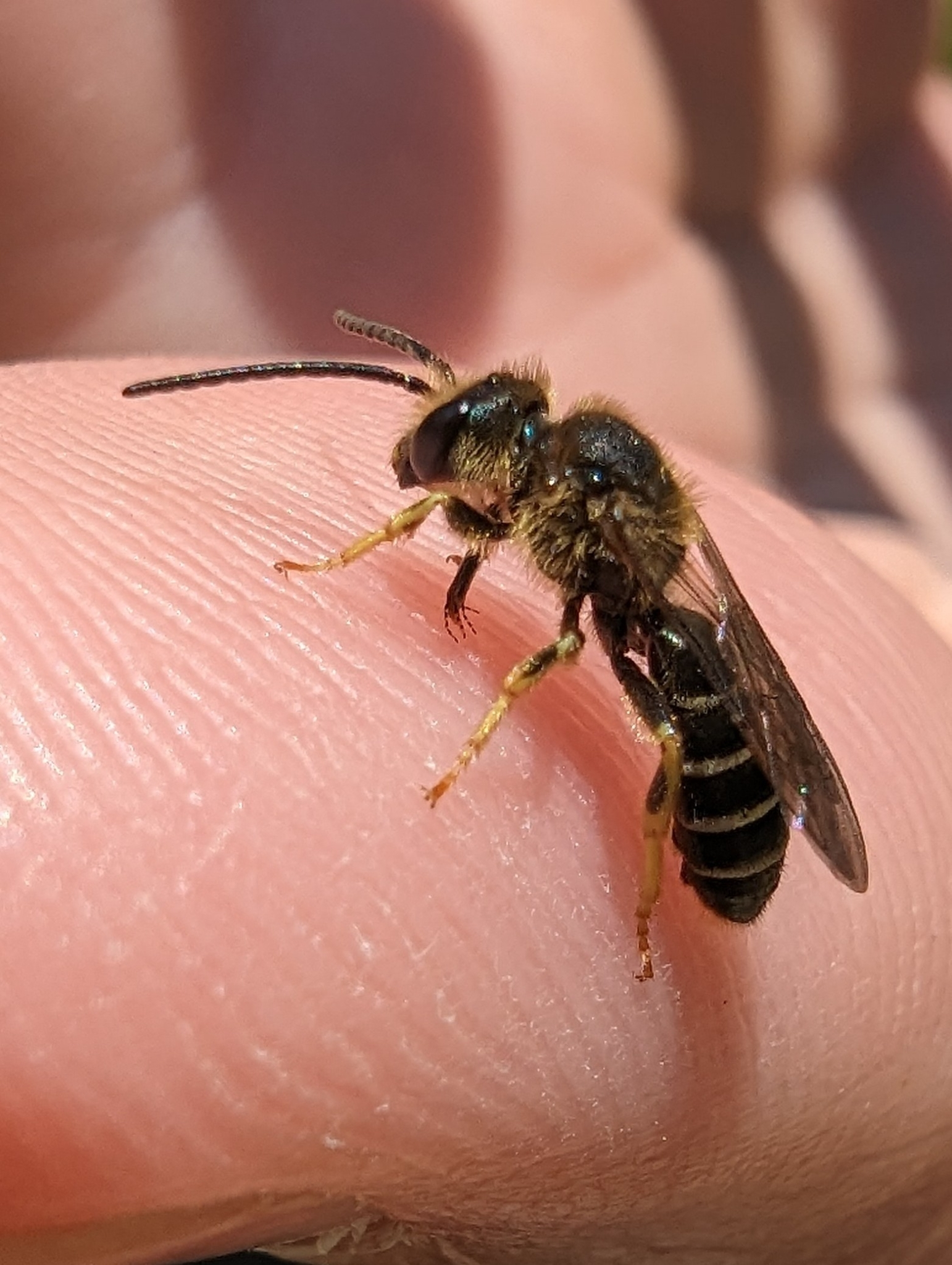
A male Halictus rubicundus with its tongue out, licking sweat

Only females have the ability to deliver a sting. Due to their non-aggressive nature, they are only likely to sting if disturbed; the sting is minor. The most common instances of stinging occur from swatting at or accidentally making contact with a halictid trying to get a lick of one's sweat, seeking the dissolved electrolytes.

== Phylogeny ==
Halictidae belongs to the hymenopteran clade Aculeata (stinging Hymenoptera), superfamily Apoidea (bees and wasps), series Anthophila (true bees). Fossils from this family are typically found in amber from the Baltic Region and the Dominican Republic and imply that Halictidae have existed since at least 96-75 million years ago. The oldest fossil record of Halictidae dates back to Early Eocene with a number of species, such as Neocorynura electra and Augochlora leptoloba known from amber deposits. Currently, the family is divided into four subfamilies, many genera, and more than 2000 known species. Rophitinae appears to be the sister group to the remaining three subfamilies (Nomiinae, Nomioidinae, Halictinae) based on both morphology and molecular data.

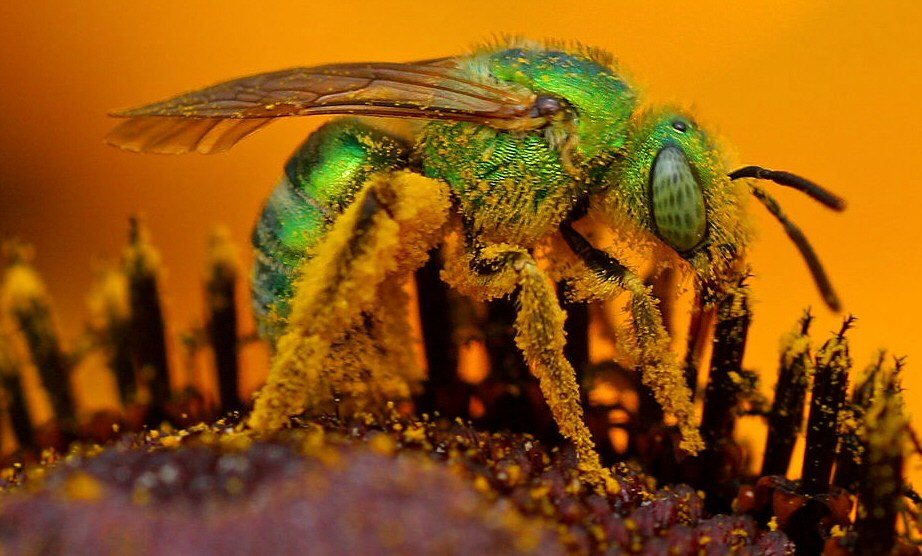
Agapostemon sp.

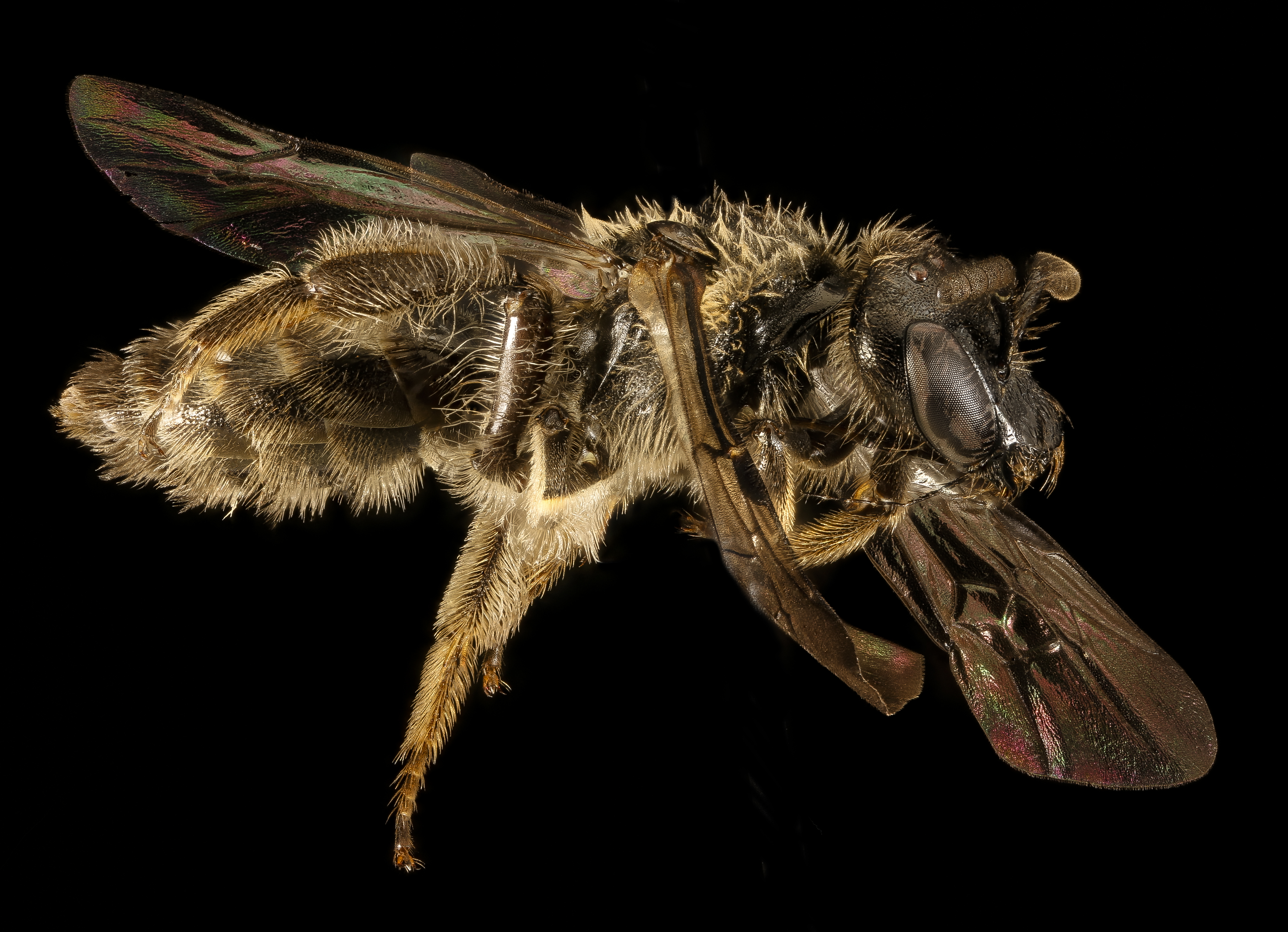
Dufourea novaeangliae side

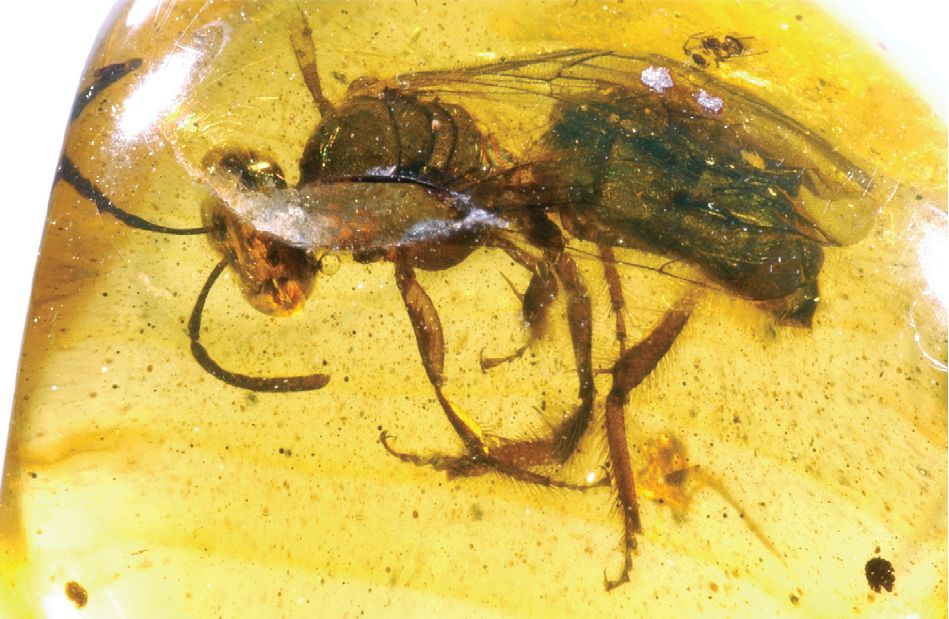
female Oligochlora semirugosa in Dominican amber of Miocene age

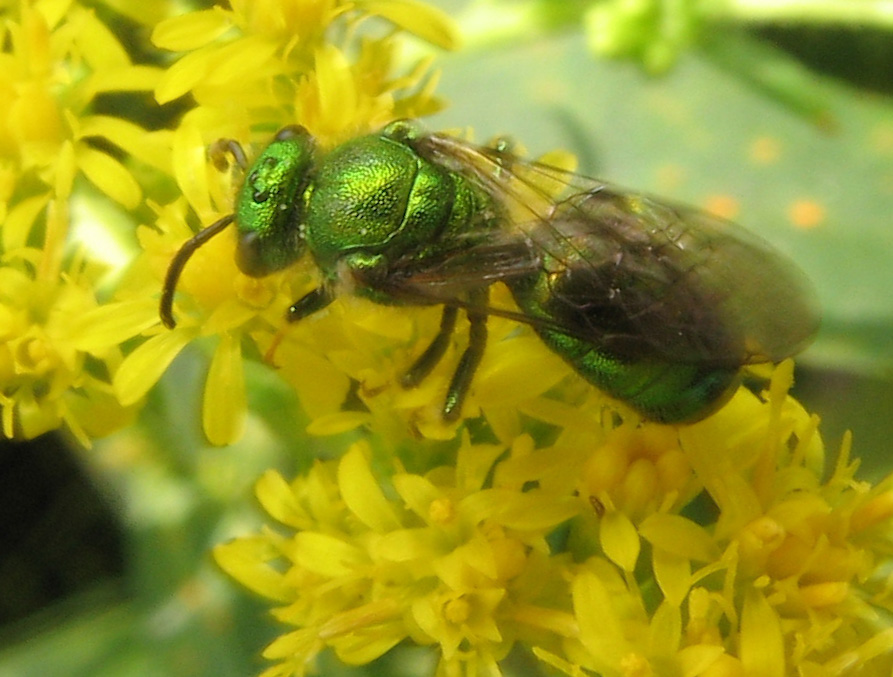
Augochloropsis metallica male

A pure green sweat bee foraging on yellow ironweed

== Classification ==
Subfamily Rophitinae:

- Ceblurgus
- Conanthalictus
- Dufourea
- Goeletapis
- Micralictoides
- Morawitzella
- Morawitzia
- Penapis
- Protodufourea
- Rophites
- Sphecodosoma
- Systropha
- Xeralictus

Subfamily Nomiinae:

- Dieunomia
- Halictonomia
- Lipotriches
- Mellitidia
- Nomia
- Pseudapis
- Ptilonomia
- Reepenia
- Spatunomia
- Sphegocephala
- Steganomus

Subfamily Nomioidinae:

- Cellariella
- Ceylalictus
- Nomioides

Subfamily Halictinae:
Tribe Halictini

- Agapostemon
- Caenohalictus
- Dinagapostemon
- Echthralictus
- Eupetersia
- Glossodialictus
- Habralictus
- Halictus
- Homalictus
- Lasioglossum
- Mexalictus
- Microsphecodes
- Nesosphecodes
- Paragapostemon
- Patellapis
- Pseudagapostemon
- Ptilocleptis
- Rhinetula
- Ruizantheda
- Sphecodes
- Thrincohalictus
- Urohalictus

Tribe Thrinchostomini

- Parathrincostoma
- Thrinchostoma

Tribe Augochlorini

- Andinaugochlora
- Ariphanarthra
- Augochlora
- Augochlorella
- Augochlorodes
- Augochloropsis
- Caenaugochlora
- Chlerogas
- Chlerogella
- Chlerogelloides
- Corynura
- Halictillus
- Ischnomelissa
- Megalopta
- Megaloptidia
- Megaloptilla
- Megommation
- Micrommation
- Neocorynura
- Paroxystoglossa
- Pseudaugochlora
- Rhectomia
- Rhinocorynura
- Temnosoma
- Thectochlora
- Xenochlora

Unplaced fossil halictines:

- †Eickwortapis
- †Nesagapostemon
- †Oligochlora
