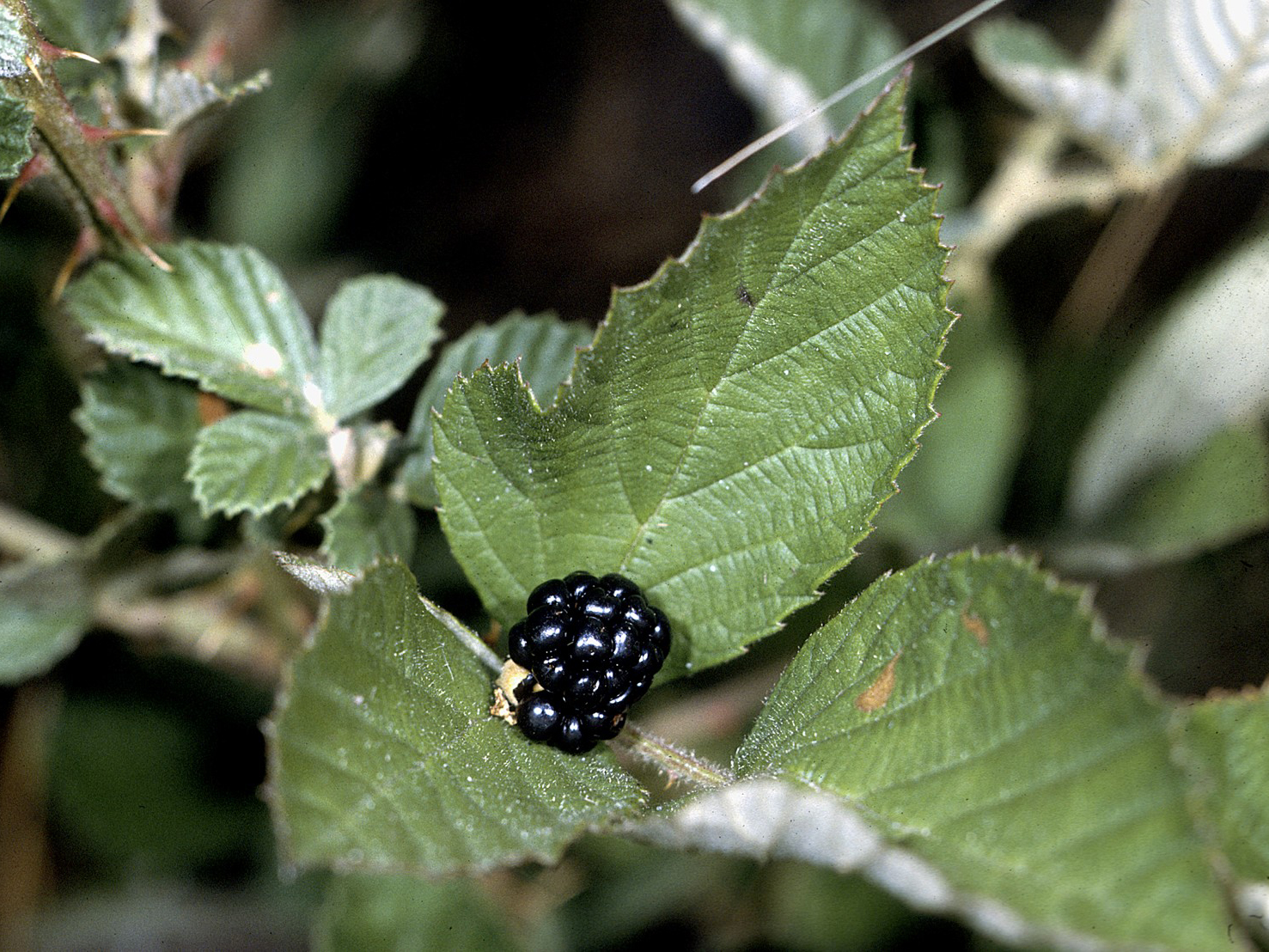
- Rubus cuneifolius

Conservation status
- Secure (NatureServe)

Scientific classification
- Kingdom: Plantae
- Clade: Embryophytes
- Clade: Tracheophytes
- Clade: Spermatophytes
- Clade: Angiosperms
- Clade: Eudicots
- Clade: Rosids
- Order: Rosales
- Family: Rosaceae
- Genus: Rubus
- Species: R. cuneifolius

Binomial name
- Rubus cuneifolius Pursh 1813 not Weihe ex Rchb. 1830 nor Mercier 1861

Synonyms
- List: Rubus audax L.H.Bailey; Rubus chapmanii L.H.Bailey; Rubus cuneifolius var. angustior L.H.Bailey; Rubus cuneifolius var. austrifer L.H.Bailey; Rubus cuneifolius var. spiniceps L.H.Bailey; Rubus cuneifolius var. subellipticus Fernald; Rubus dixiensis H.A.Davis, A.M.Fuller & T.Davis; Rubus escatilis L.H.Bailey; Rubus georgiensis L.H.Bailey; Rubus humei L.H.Bailey; Rubus longii Fernald; Rubus parvifolius Walter; Rubus probativus L.H.Bailey; Rubus randolphiorum L.H.Bailey; Rubus sejunctus L.H.Bailey

= Rubus cuneifolius =

Berry and plant

Rubus cuneifolius, the sand blackberry, is a North American species of flowering plant in the rose family.

== Taxonomy ==
The genetics of Rubus is extremely complex, so it is difficult to decide which groups should be recognized as species. There are many rare species with limited ranges such as this. Further study is suggested to clarify the taxonomy.

== Distribution and habitat ==
R. cuneifolius occurs in the eastern United States in every coastal state from Louisiana to New Hampshire, with the exception of Rhode Island. There are also reports of inland populations in Tennessee, Arkansas, and Oklahoma. The species has become invasive in South Africa.

Within its native range, the species has been observed in habitat types such as hardwood forests, longleaf pinelands, and in wooded floodplains. It has also been observed in disturbed environments such as along roadsides and firebreaks.

== Ecology ==
Rubus cuneifolius is insect pollinated and is recorded to have been visited in northern Florida by Agapostemon sericeus, Agapostemon splendens, Andrena cressonii, Anthidiellum notatum, Augochloropsis anonyma, Augochlorella aurata, Augochloropsis metallica, Augochloropsis sumptuosa, Bombus impatiens, Ceratina , Coelioxys sayi, Halictus poeyi/ligatus, Heriades variolosa/leavitti, Hoplitis pilosifrons, Lasioglossum pectorale, Lasioglossum reticulatum, Lasioglossum tegulare/puteulanum, Lasioglossum weemsi/leviense, Megachile mendica, Megachile petulans, Nomada affabilis, Osmia inspergens, and Xylocopa virginica .
