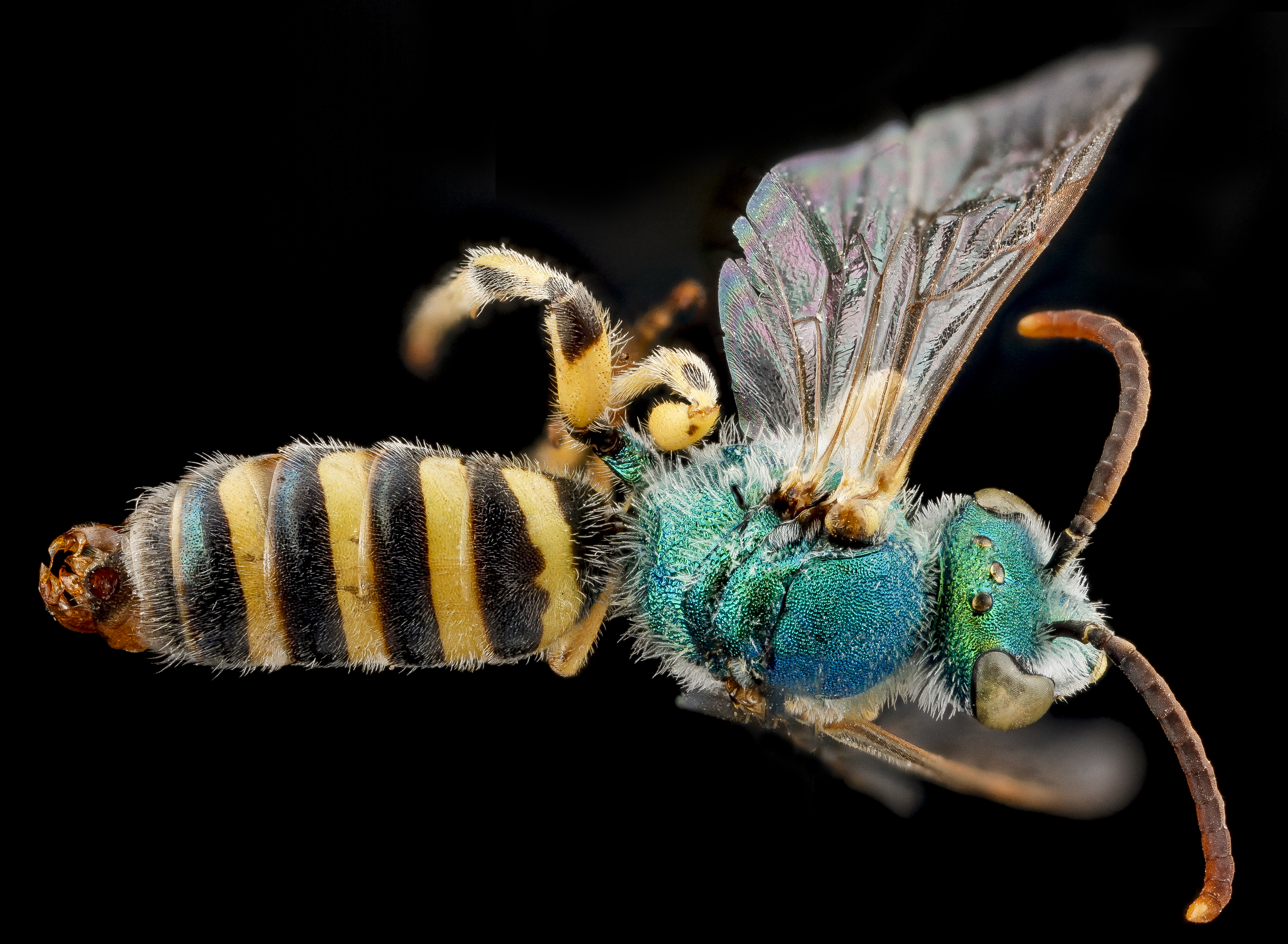

Scientific classification
- Domain: Eukaryota
- Kingdom: Animalia
- Phylum: Arthropoda
- Class: Insecta
- Order: Hymenoptera
- Family: Halictidae
- Tribe: Halictini
- Genus: Agapostemon
- Species: A. angelicus

Binomial name
- Agapostemon angelicus Cockerell, 1924

= Agapostemon angelicus =

Species of bee

Agapostemon angelicus is a species of sweat bee in the family Halictidae native to North America. Unlike apid bees, members of the Halictidae family are not honey-producers, although they still are pollinators.

== Subspecies ==
These two subspecies belong to the species Agapostemon angelicus:

- Agapostemon angelicus angelicus
- Agapostemon angelicus idahoensis

== Description and identification ==
Angeles striped sweat bees are small, approximately 10 mm to 14 mm in length. The species exhibits distinct sexual dimorphism with the female being a metallic green bee across its entire body whereas males have a bright yellow and black banded metasoma. A. angelicus is easily confused with A. texanus. Only the females have a small stinger.

== Distribution and habitat ==
The distribution of the Angeles striped sweat bee is limited to North America, from Canada south to Mexico. They are most commonly found in the western and central US, in and around the desert regions of the southwestern US.

== Behavior ==
As sweat bees, they get their name due to their attraction to human sweat. They often land on humans and lick sweat from the skin for the salt content. Males seem less likely to exhibit this behavior. They are polylectic pollinators, willing to feed off the nectar from any available pollen source. While generally docile, females are capable of stinging. Primarily active during the day, this species may take refuge on larger flowers during the night. The social nature of varies with females seeming to prefer to be solitary, while groups of males may gather on a single plant.

Like most members of the Halictidae family, female Angeles striped sweat bees build their nests in the form of tunnels in soil, or other substrates. Halictidae bees do not feed their young honey, but instead leave balls of pollen in the nest where eggs are laid for the young to consume. It's unclear if the nests of A. Angelicus are communally shared by females or not.
