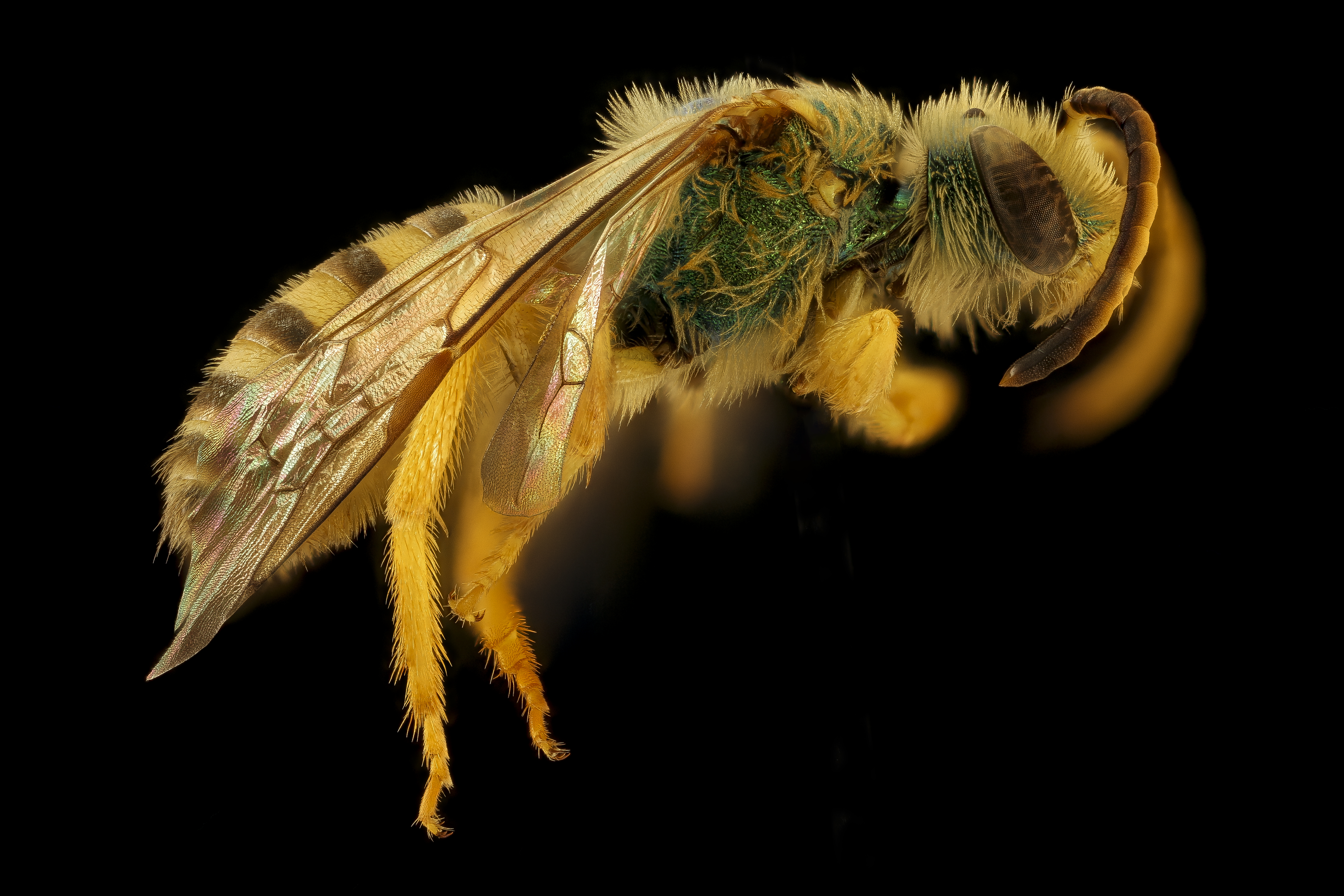

Scientific classification
- Domain: Eukaryota
- Kingdom: Animalia
- Phylum: Arthropoda
- Class: Insecta
- Order: Hymenoptera
- Family: Halictidae
- Tribe: Halictini
- Genus: Agapostemon
- Species: A. nasutus

Binomial name
- Agapostemon nasutus Smith, 1853

= Agapostemon nasutus =

Species of bee

Agapostemon nasutus is a species of sweat bee in the family Halictidae.

== Subspecies ==
These two subspecies belong to the species Agapostemon nasutus:

- Agapostemon nasutus gualanicus Cockerell
- Agapostemon nasutus nasutus
