= Mexalictus arizonensis =

Scientific classification
- Domain: Eukaryota
- Kingdom: Animalia
- Phylum: Arthropoda
- Class: Insecta
- Order: Hymenoptera
- Family: Halictidae
- Tribe: Halictini
- Genus: Mexalictus
- Species: M. arizonensis

Binomial name
- Mexalictus arizonensis Eickwort, 1978

Species of bee

Mexalictus arizonensis, the Arizona mexalictus, is a species of sweat bee in the family Halictidae.
