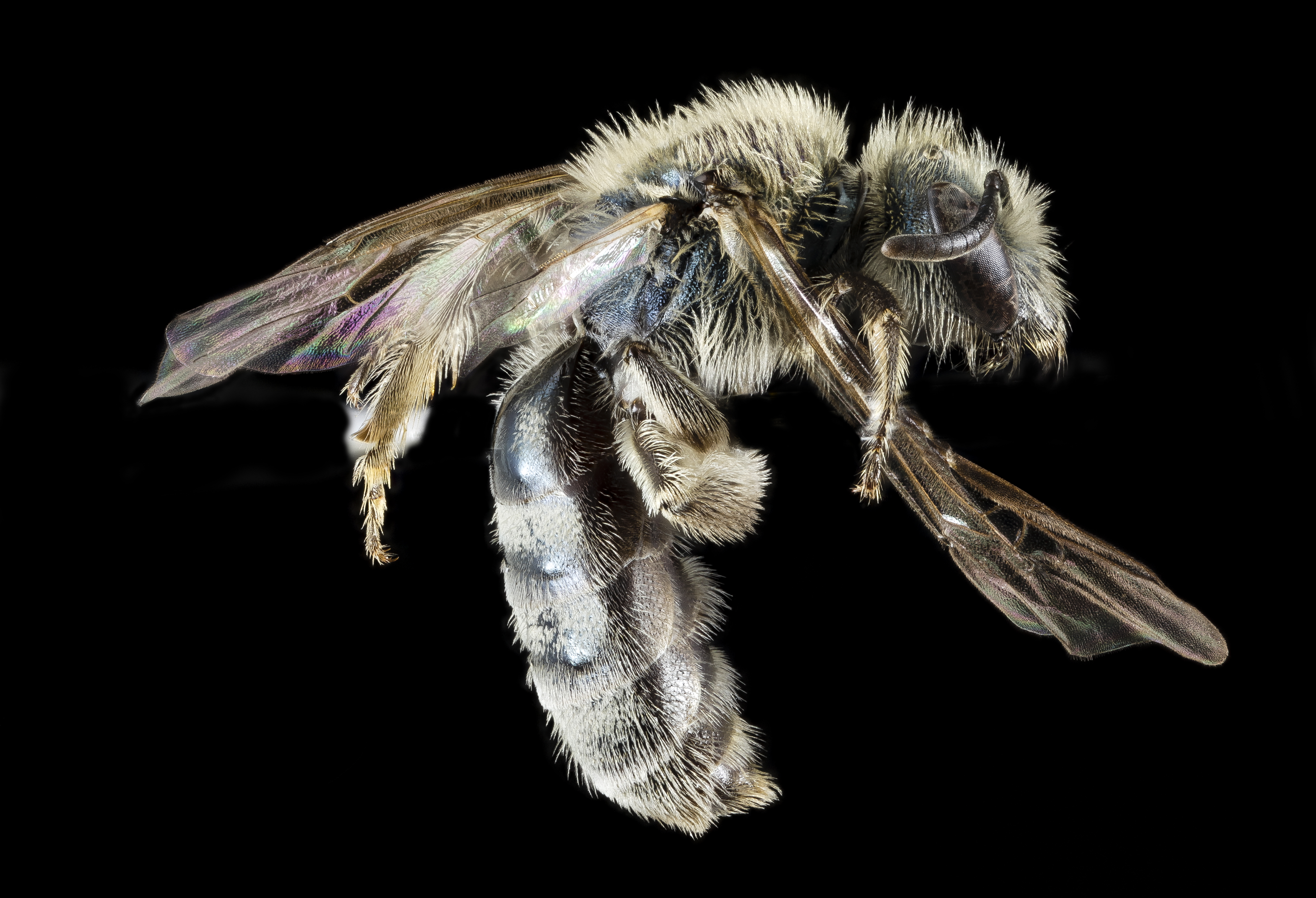

Scientific classification
- Kingdom: Animalia
- Phylum: Arthropoda
- Class: Insecta
- Order: Hymenoptera
- Family: Halictidae
- Tribe: Halictini
- Genus: Lasioglossum
- Species: L. pavonotum

Binomial name
- Lasioglossum pavonotum (Cockerell, 1925)

= Lasioglossum pavonotum =

Species of bee

Lasioglossum pavonotum is a species of sweat bee in the family Halictidae.
