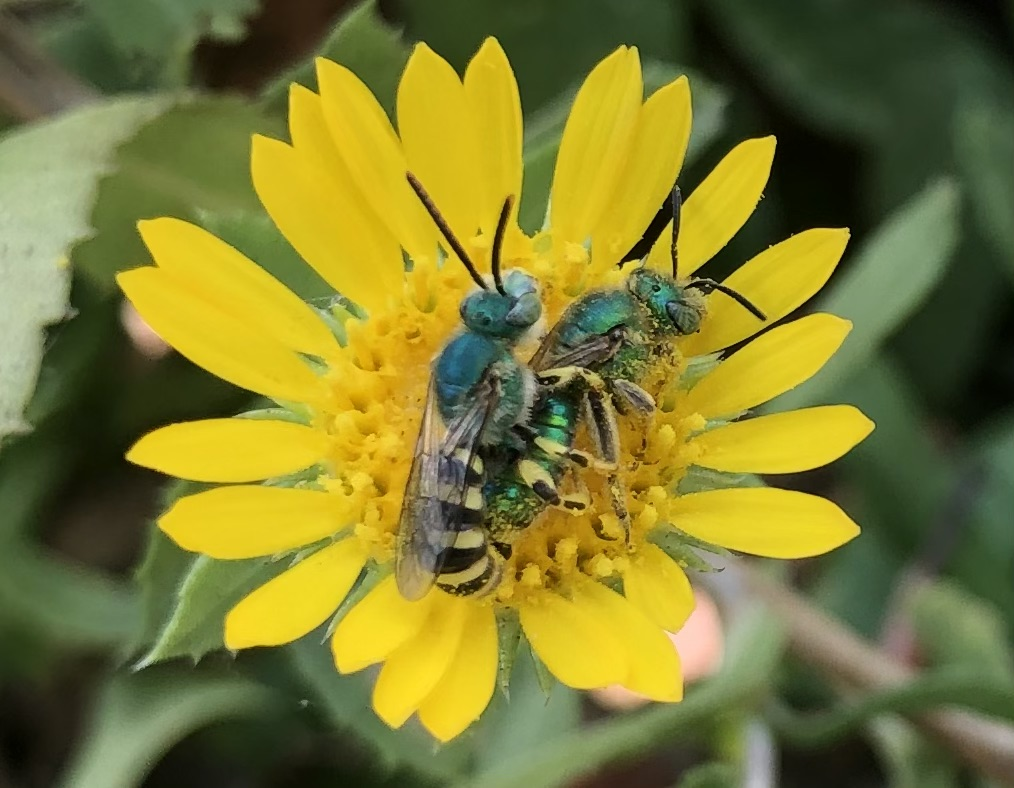
- Los Angeles, California, 2024

Scientific classification
- Kingdom: Animalia
- Phylum: Arthropoda
- Clade: Pancrustacea
- Class: Insecta
- Order: Hymenoptera
- Family: Halictidae
- Genus: Agapostemon
- Species: A. subtilior

Binomial name
- Agapostemon subtilior Cockerell, 1898

= Agapostemon subtilior =

Species of bee

Agapostemon subtilior is a North American species of sweat bee commonly known as the fine striped sweat bee.

== Description ==
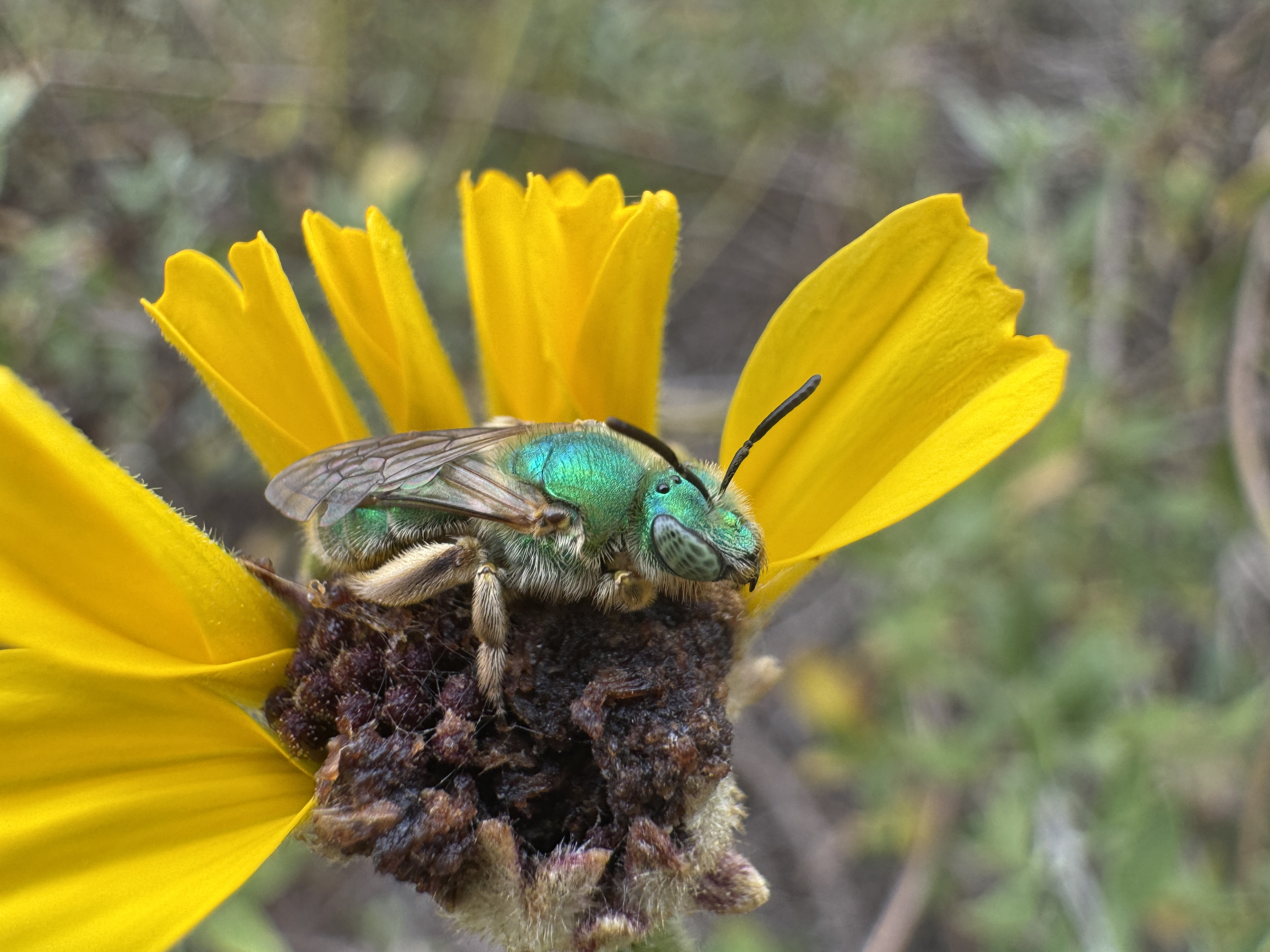
Side and top view of a female

Adult female bees are entirely green and typically approximately 11 mm (0.43 in) in length, while males are slightly smaller at 9–10 mm (0.35–0.39 in) and have abdomens striped with yellow.

An individual of A. subtilior may change color based on atmospheric humidity, varying from bluish to pale green as local conditions become respectively drier or moister.

== Taxonomy ==
Agapostemon subtilior was originally described in 1898 by Theodore D. A. Cockerell. Grace Sandhouse synonymized A. subtilior under A. texanus in 1936.

In 2024, the species name was revived, being applied to sweat bee populations formerly identified as A. texanus that occur outside the prairie areas of central North America.

The species epithet subtilior means "finer, more slender, or thinner." It is not known what motivated Cockerell to select this name, but finer sculpturing on the propodeum has been noted compared to related species.

== Distribution ==
The fine striped sweat bee occurs across the northern and central regions of the continental United States, and on the west coast of the U.S. at least as far south as the border with Mexico.

== Behavior ==
A generalist forager that collects pollen from many species of plants, A. subtilior nests in the ground in solitary burrows.
