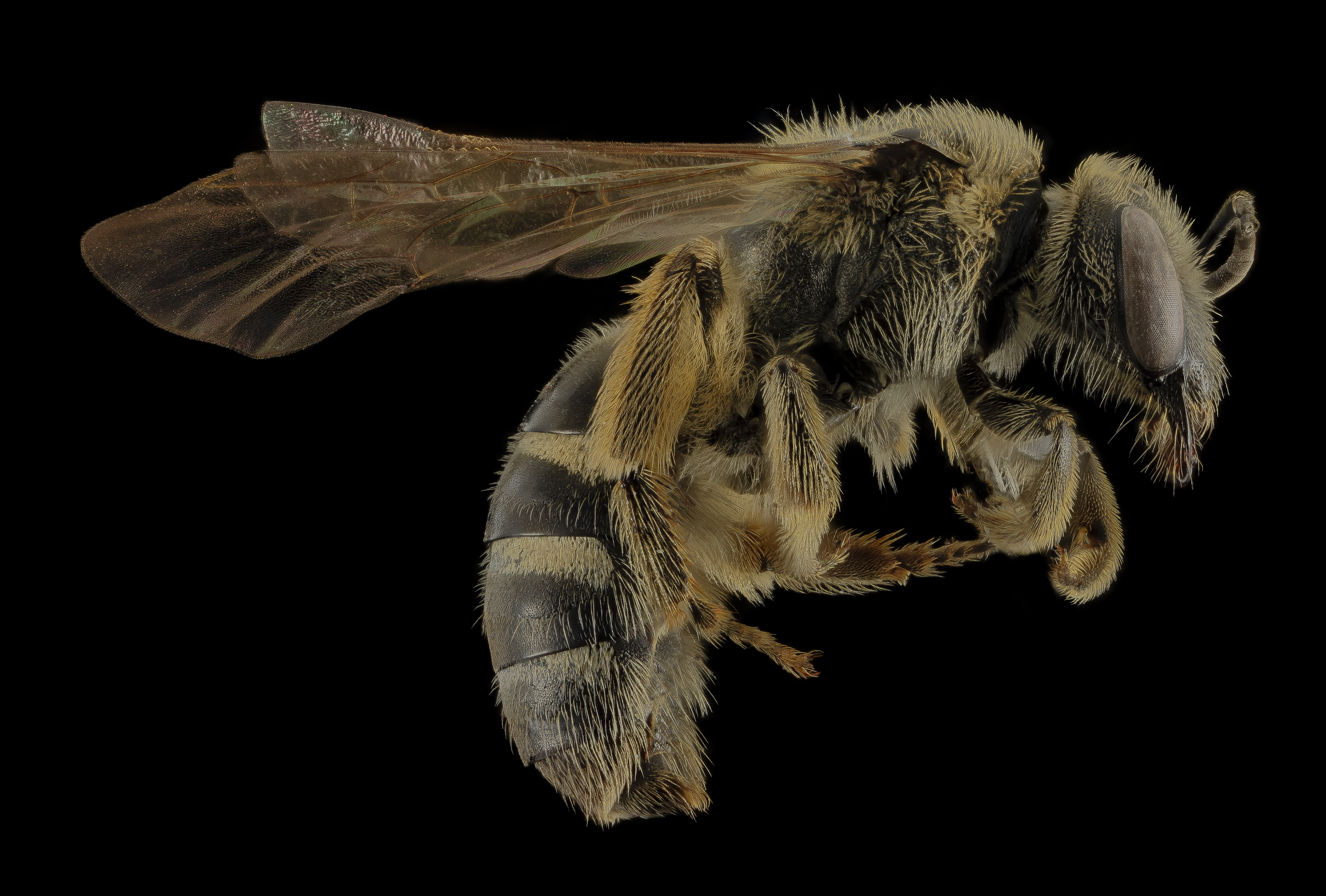

Scientific classification
- Domain: Eukaryota
- Kingdom: Animalia
- Phylum: Arthropoda
- Class: Insecta
- Order: Hymenoptera
- Family: Halictidae
- Tribe: Halictini
- Genus: Lasioglossum
- Species: L. coriaceum

Binomial name
- Lasioglossum coriaceum (Smith, 1853)

= Lasioglossum coriaceum =

Species of insect

Lasioglossum coriaceum is a species of sweat bee in the family Halictidae. A common name is leathery sweat bee.
