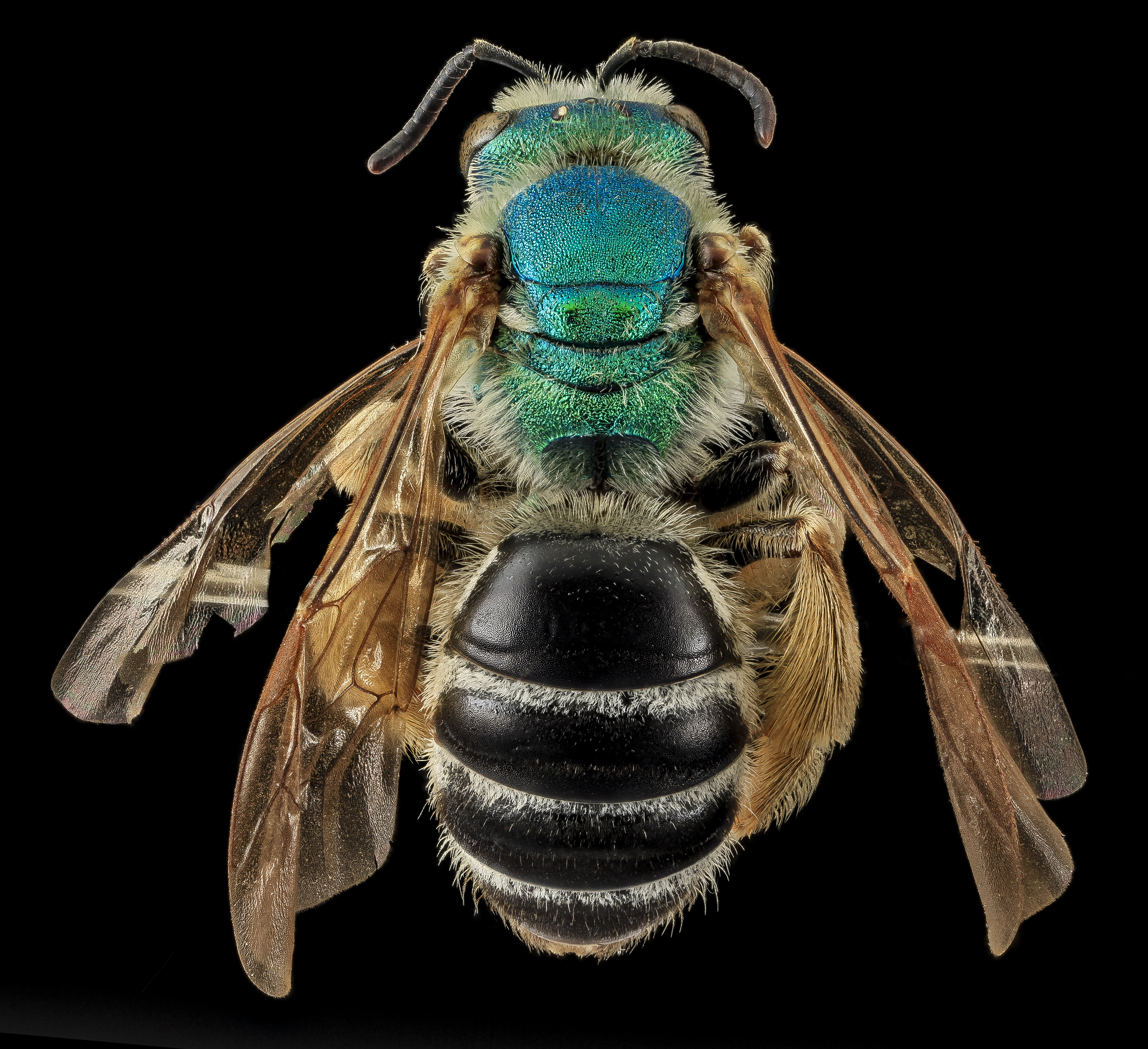

Scientific classification
- Domain: Eukaryota
- Kingdom: Animalia
- Phylum: Arthropoda
- Class: Insecta
- Order: Hymenoptera
- Family: Halictidae
- Tribe: Halictini
- Genus: Agapostemon
- Species: A. coloradinus

Binomial name
- Agapostemon coloradinus (Vachal, 1903)

= Agapostemon coloradinus =

Species of bee

Agapostemon coloradinus is a species of sweat bee in the family Halictidae.
