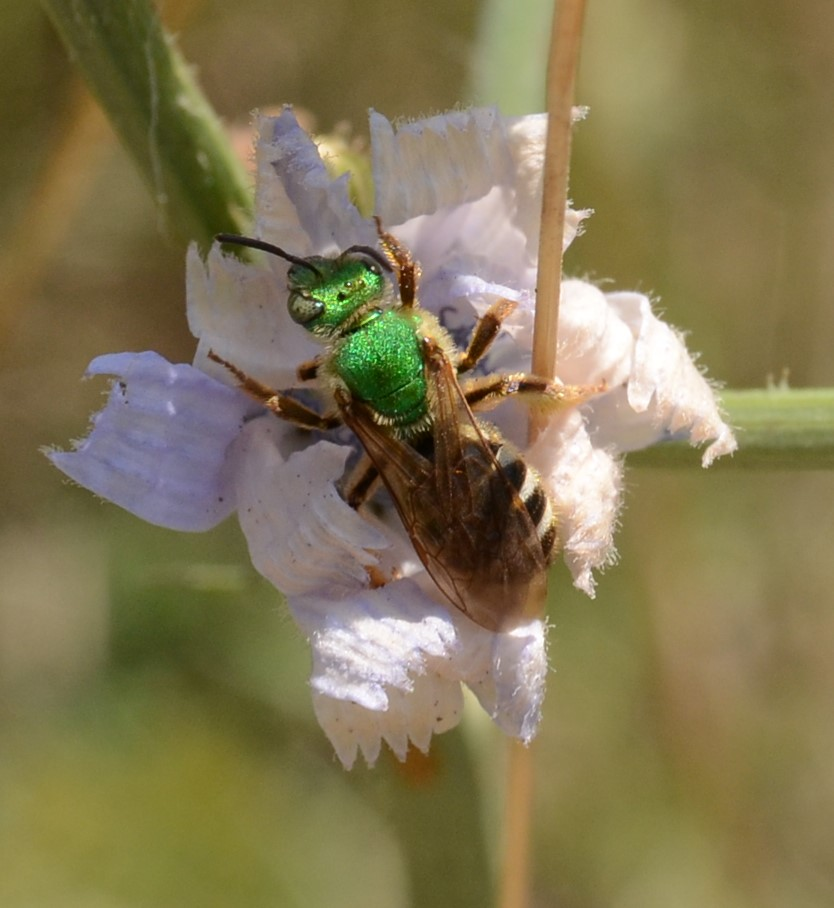

Scientific classification
- Kingdom: Animalia
- Phylum: Arthropoda
- Class: Insecta
- Order: Hymenoptera
- Family: Halictidae
- Tribe: Halictini
- Genus: Agapostemon
- Species: A. virescens

Binomial name
- Agapostemon virescens (Fabricius, 1775)

= Agapostemon virescens =

Species of bee

Agapostemon virescens, the bicolored striped sweat bee, is a species of sweat bee in the family Halictidae. It is found in North America, and is the official bee of the city of Toronto. Like other species in its genus, A. virescens nests underground, in aggregations wherein multiple females share a single burrow.

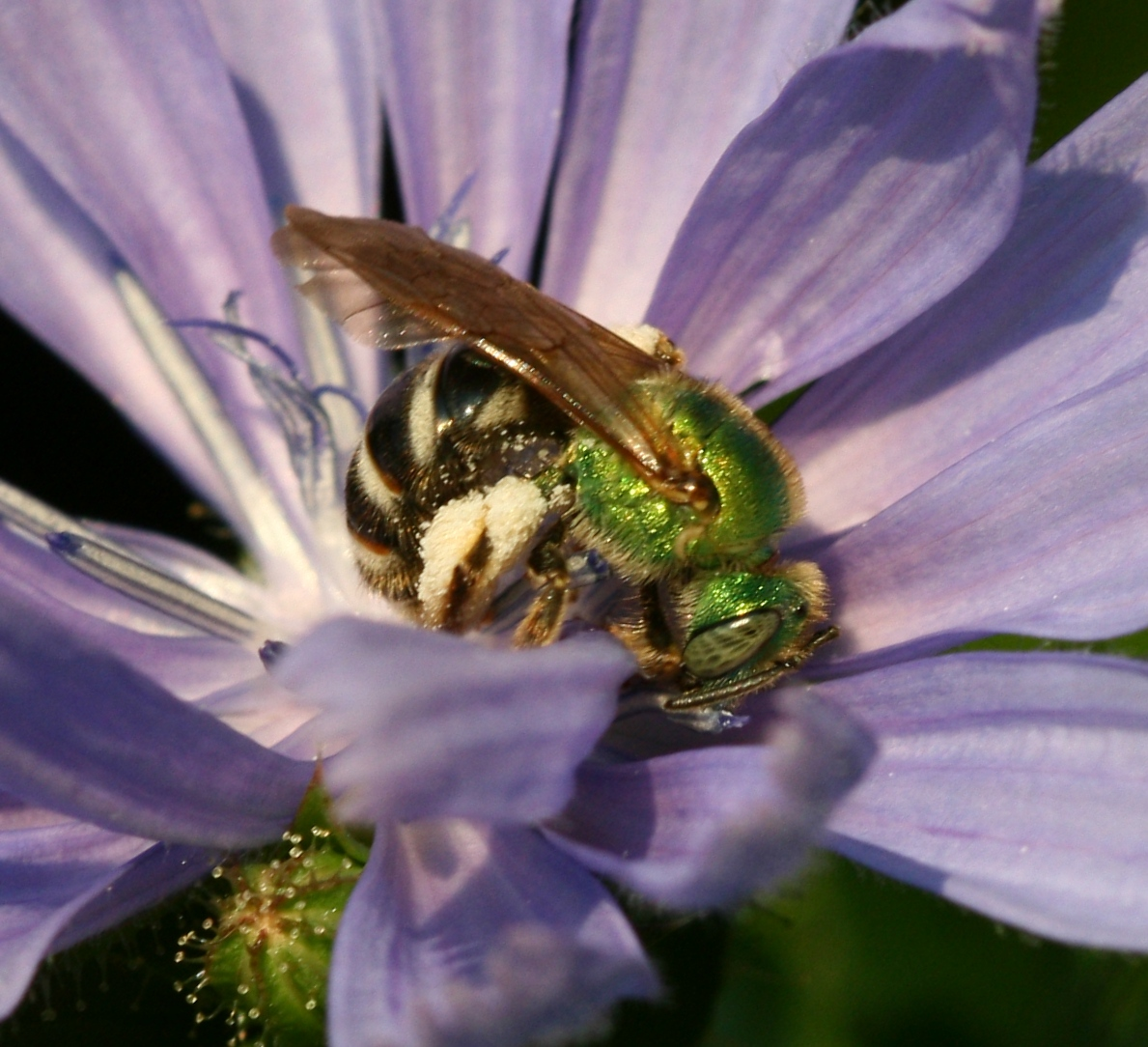
Bicolored striped-sweat bee, Agapostemon virescens

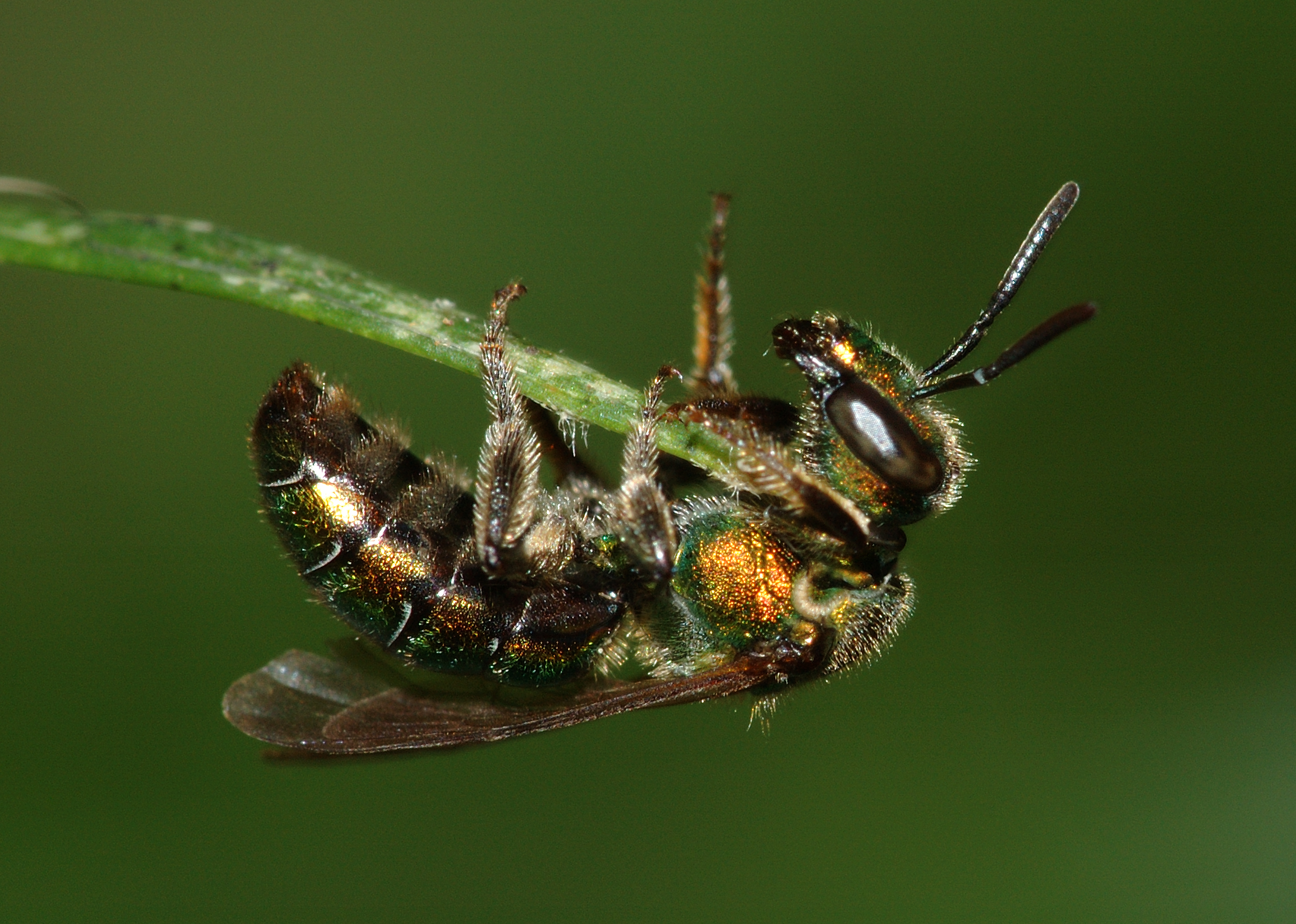
Bicolored striped-sweat bee, Agapostemon virescens
