= Agapostemon tyleri =

Scientific classification
- Kingdom: Animalia
- Phylum: Arthropoda
- Class: Insecta
- Order: Hymenoptera
- Family: Halictidae
- Tribe: Halictini
- Genus: Agapostemon
- Species: A. tyleri

Binomial name
- Agapostemon tyleri Cockerell, 1917

Species of bee

Agapostemon tyleri is a species of sweat bee in the family Halictidae.
