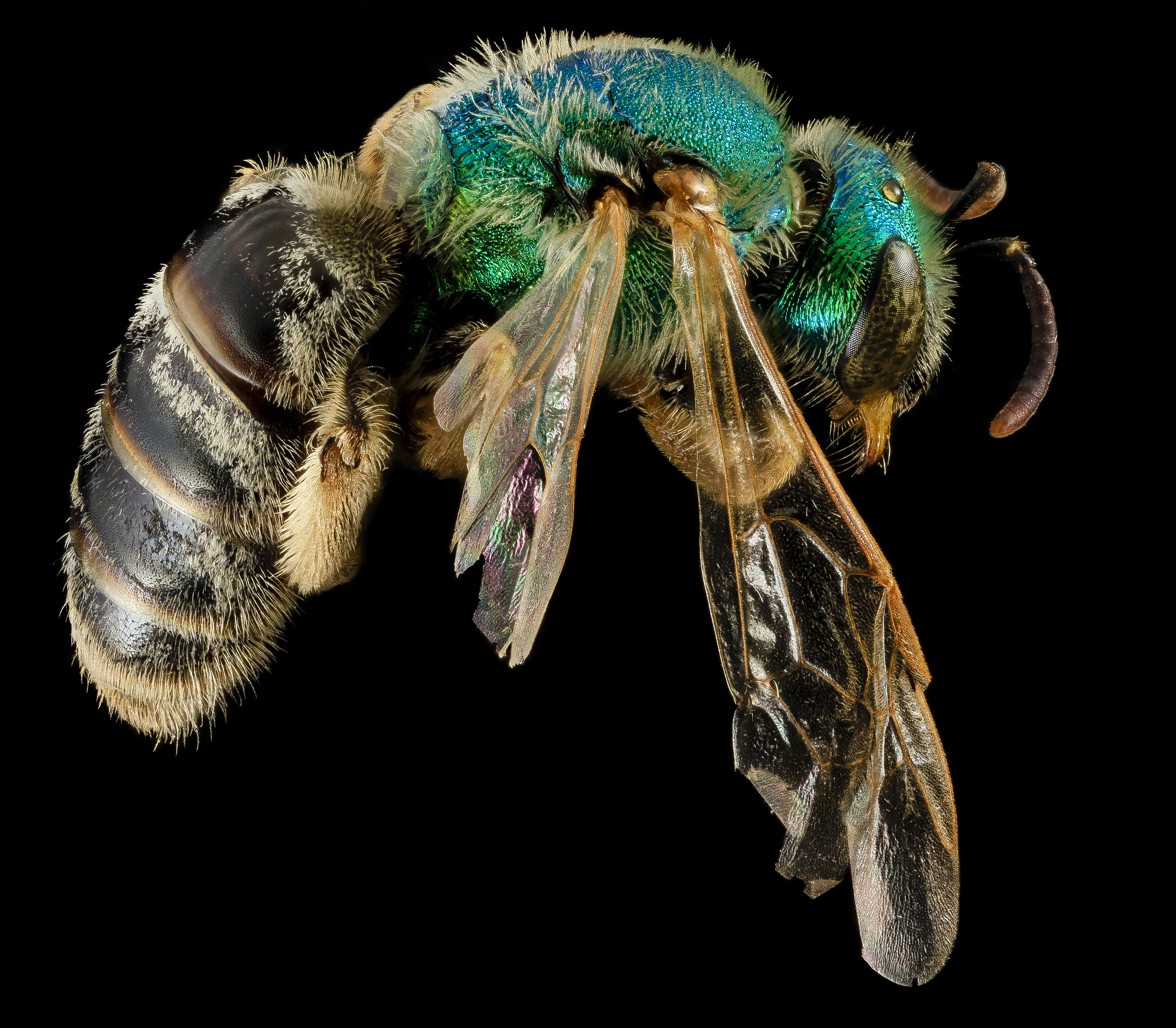

Scientific classification
- Domain: Eukaryota
- Kingdom: Animalia
- Phylum: Arthropoda
- Class: Insecta
- Order: Hymenoptera
- Family: Halictidae
- Tribe: Halictini
- Genus: Agapostemon
- Species: A. melliventris

Binomial name
- Agapostemon melliventris Cresson, 1874

= Agapostemon melliventris =

Species of bee

Agapostemon melliventris, the honey-tailed striped sweat bee, is a species of sweat bee in the family Halictidae.

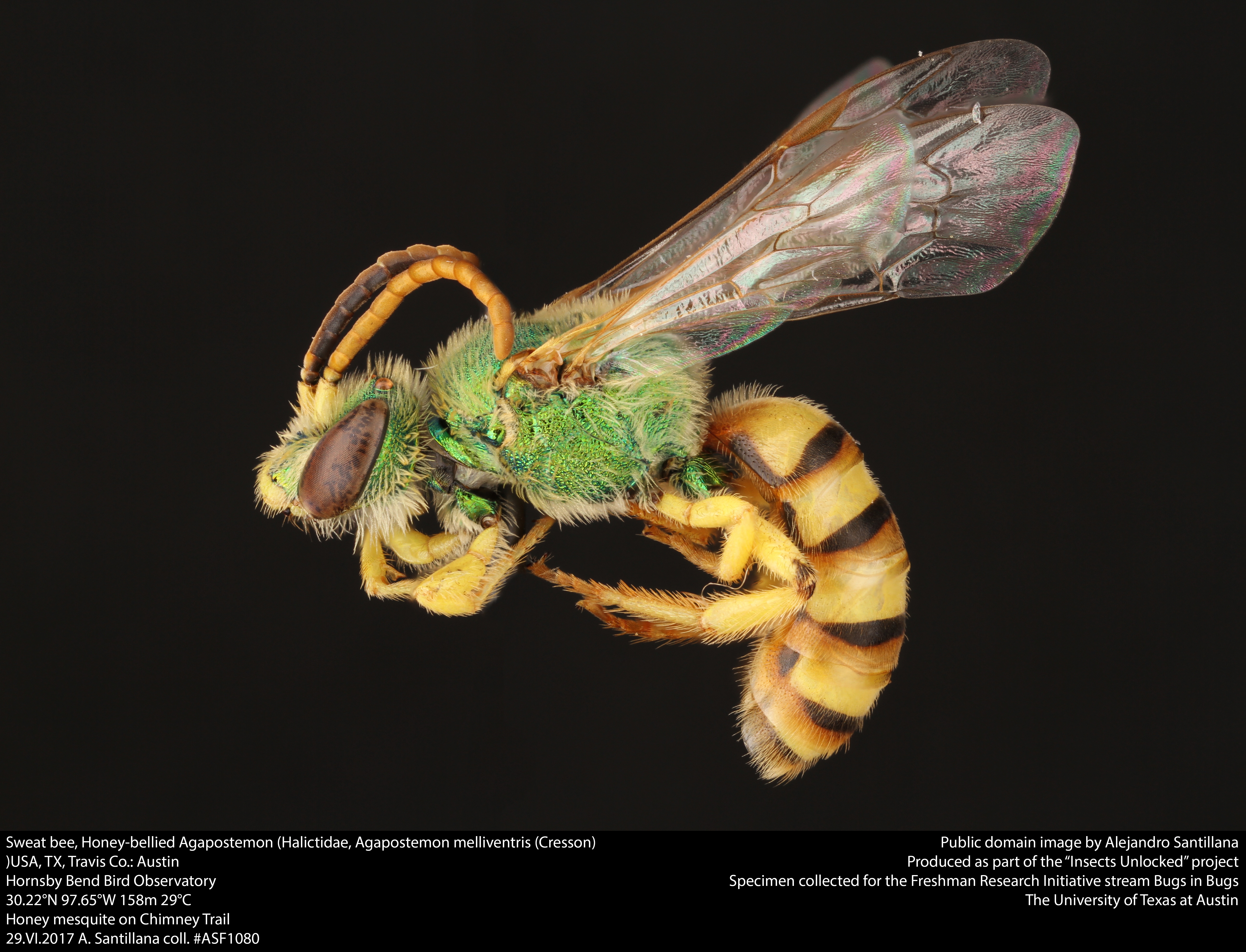
Honey-tailed striped-sweat bee, Agapostemon melliventris
