= Mexalictus =

Scientific classification
- Domain: Eukaryota
- Kingdom: Animalia
- Phylum: Arthropoda
- Class: Insecta
- Order: Hymenoptera
- Family: Halictidae
- Subfamily: Halictinae
- Tribe: Halictini
- Genus: Mexalictus; Eickwort, 1978

Genus of bees

Mexalictus is a genus of sweat bees in the family Halictidae. There are more than 20 described species in Mexalictus.

== Species ==
These 22 species belong to the genus Mexalictus:

- Mexalictus albofasciatus Dumesh, 2013
- Mexalictus anatolii Dumesh, 2013
- Mexalictus arizonensis Eickwort, 1978 (Arizona mexalictus)
- Mexalictus astriatus Dumesh, 2013
- Mexalictus ayalai Dumesh, 2013
- Mexalictus benyamini Dumesh, 2013
- Mexalictus diversus Dumesh, 2013
- Mexalictus eickworti Godínez-García, 1996
- Mexalictus genalis Dumesh, 2013
- Mexalictus gibbsi Dumesh, 2013
- Mexalictus guatemalensis Dumesh, 2013
- Mexalictus hansoni Dumesh, 2013
- Mexalictus jovelus Dumesh, 2013
- Mexalictus mexicanus Eickwort, 1978
- Mexalictus micheneri Eickwort, 1978
- Mexalictus nicaraguense Dumesh, 2013
- Mexalictus polybioides Packer, 1993
- Mexalictus punctatus
- Mexalictus raavo
- Mexalictus sheffieldi Dumesh, 2013
- Mexalictus veracruzense Dumesh, 2013
- Mexalictus verdazulus
