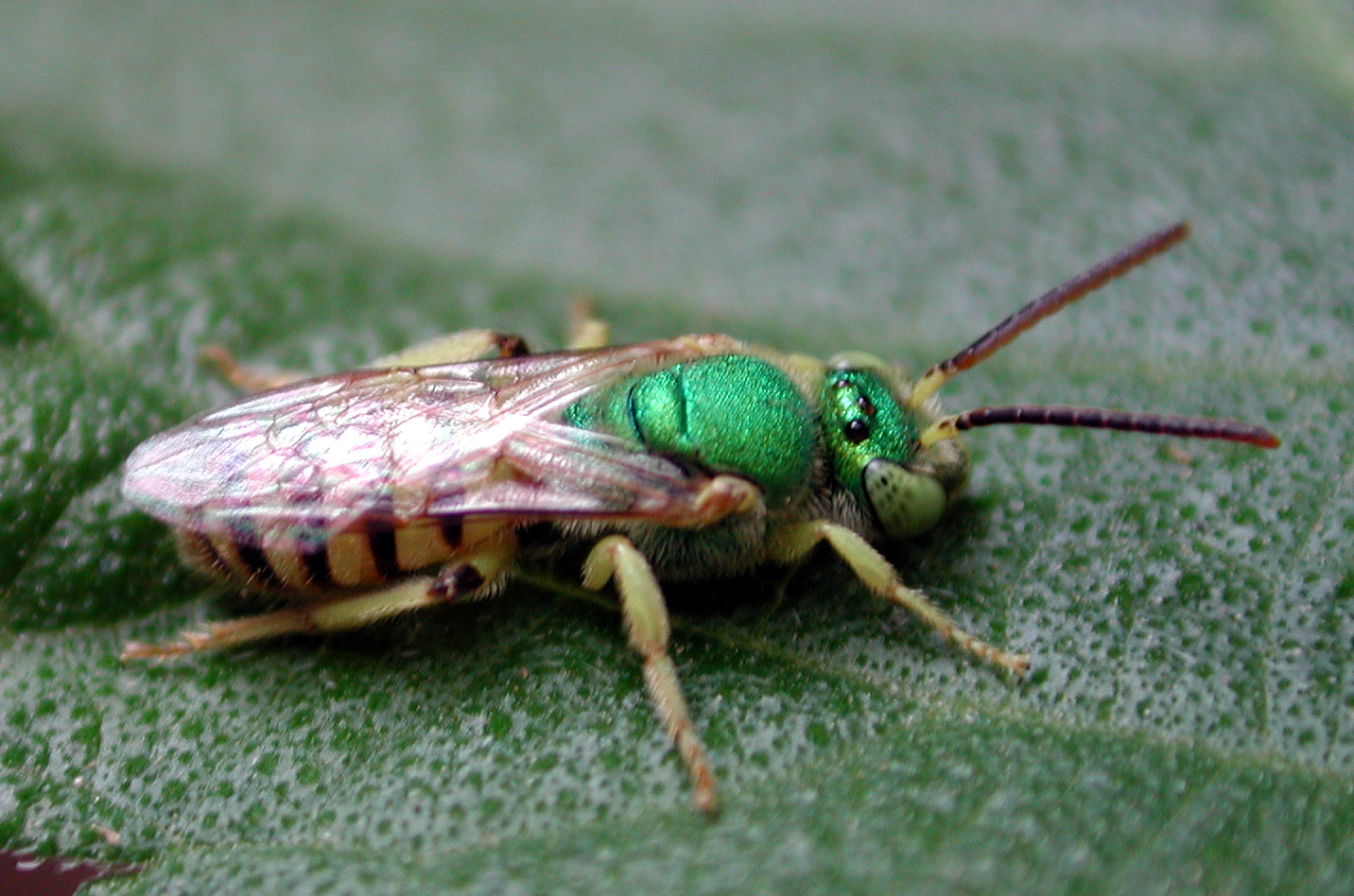
- Agapostemon texanus male

Scientific classification
- Kingdom: Animalia
- Phylum: Arthropoda
- Clade: Pancrustacea
- Class: Insecta
- Order: Hymenoptera
- Family: Halictidae
- Subfamily: Halictinae
- Tribe: Halictini
- Genus: Agapostemon; Guérin-Méneville, 1844

= Agapostemon =

Genus of bees

The genus Agapostemon (literally "stamen loving") is a common group of Western Hemisphere sweat bees.

They are members of the family of bees known as Halictidae. Unlike other sweat bees, they are not attracted to human sweat. They are generally green or blue, especially the head and thorax. Sometimes the abdomen in females is green or blue, although it may be striped, and most males have the yellow-striped abdomen on a black or metallic background. They superficially resemble various members of another tribe, the Augochlorini, which are also typically metallic green.

== Nesting ==
All species of Agapostemon nest in the ground, sometimes in dense aggregations. Some species are communal, such as A. virescens. In this and other communal species, multiple females share the same nest entrance, but beneath the common entrance burrow, they construct their own portion of the nest. Thus, each female digs her own brood cells and collects pollen and nectar to fashion the pollen ball upon which she will lay an egg.

Unlike other social bees, in communal bees there is no reproductive division of labor. The advantage of this form of sociality seems to be that kleptoparasitic Nomada cuckoo bees have greater difficulty gaining access to the nest and brood cells when there are multiple females inside.

== Range ==
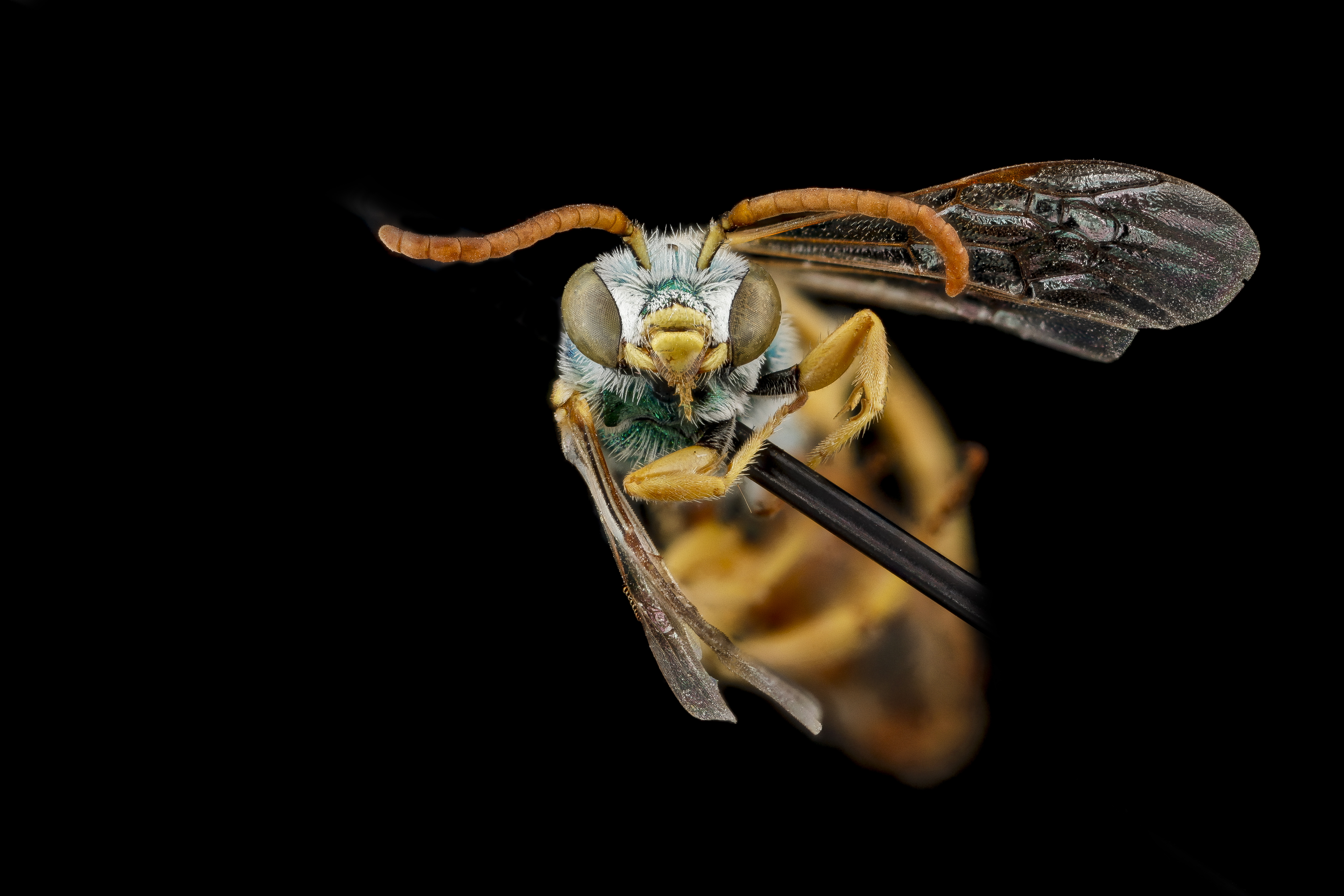
A. angelicus

Some 42 species in the genus range from Canada to Argentina. In cool temperate regions, there is one generation per year, with females active in the early summer and males and pre-diapausing females active in the late summer. Only mated females survive the winter. This is probably because unmated females cannot enter diapause. Males can often be seen in large numbers flying around shrubs with large flowers, such as Rose of Sharon. Agapostemon angelicus is native to the Texas high plains. They specialize in being pollinators for cotton. They can serve as a replacement for honey bees in pollination.

== Types of flight ==
Like other bees, A. texanus can fly from a short or long distance. Their flight patterns usually rely on flower density; they favor flowers with high densities. Their flight patterns best resemble those of the bumble bee and the honey bee.

== Species ==
Over 40 species of Agapostemon have been identified:

- Agapostemon aenigma
- Agapostemon alayoi
- Agapostemon angelicus
- Agapostemon ascius
- Agapostemon atrocaeruleus
- Agapostemon boliviensis
- Agapostemon centratus
- Agapostemon chapadensis
- Agapostemon chiriquiensis
- Agapostemon coloradinus
- Agapostemon columbi
- Agapostemon cubensis
- Agapostemon cyaneus
- Agapostemon erebus
- Agapostemon femoratus
- Agapostemon heterurus
- Agapostemon inca
- Agapostemon insularis
- Agapostemon intermedius
- Agapostemon jamaicensis
- Agapostemon kohliellus
- Agapostemon krugii
- Agapostemon lanosus
- Agapostemon leunculus
- Agapostemon melliventris
- Agapostemon mexicanus
- Agapostemon mourei
- Agapostemon nasutus
- Agapostemon obliquus
- Agapostemon obscuratus
- Agapostemon ochromops
- Agapostemon peninsularis
- Agapostemon poeyi
- Agapostemon rhopalocerus
- Agapostemon sapphirinus
- Agapostemon semimelleus
- Agapostemon sericeus
- Agapostemon splendens
- Agapostemon subtilior
- Agapostemon swainsonae
- Agapostemon texanus
- Agapostemon tyleri
- Agapostemon viequesensis
- Agapostemon virescens
- Agapostemon viridulus
