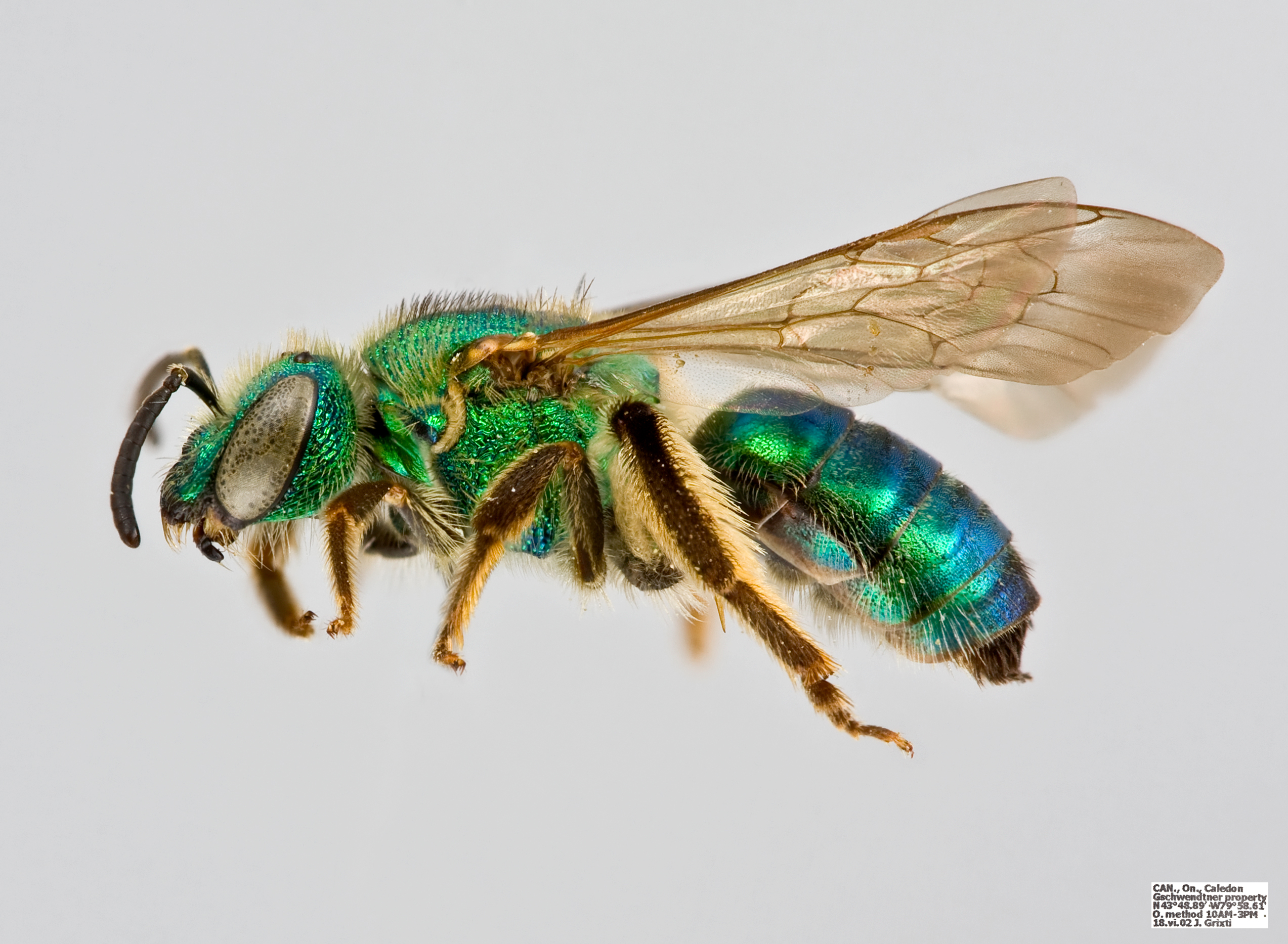

Scientific classification
- Kingdom: Animalia
- Phylum: Arthropoda
- Clade: Pancrustacea
- Class: Insecta
- Order: Hymenoptera
- Family: Halictidae
- Tribe: Halictini
- Genus: Agapostemon
- Species: A. sericeus

Binomial name
- Agapostemon sericeus (Forster, 1771)

= Agapostemon sericeus =

Species of bee

Agapostemon sericeus, the silky striped sweat bee, is a species of sweat bee in the family Halictidae.

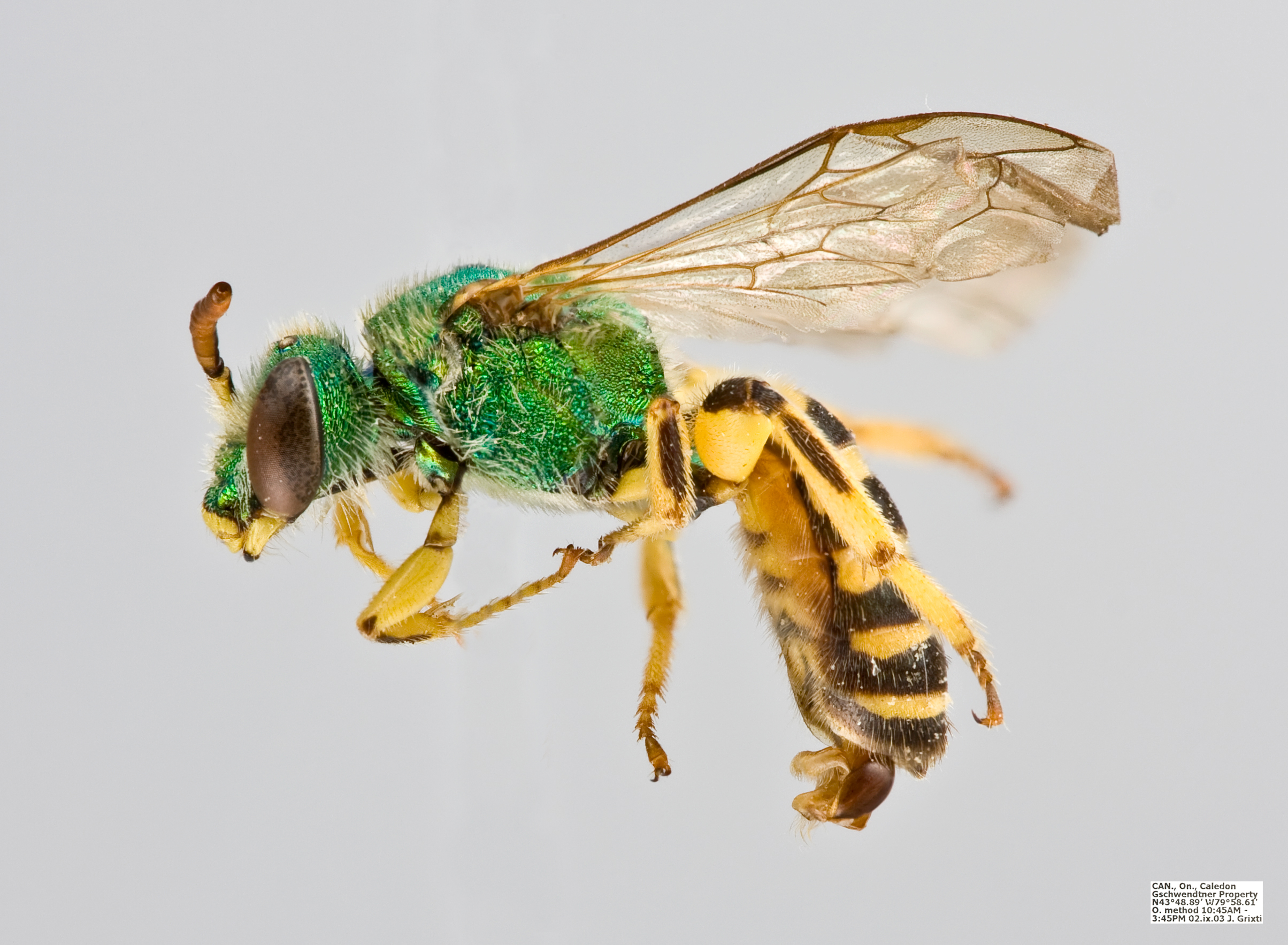
Silky striped-sweat bee, Agapostemon sericeus

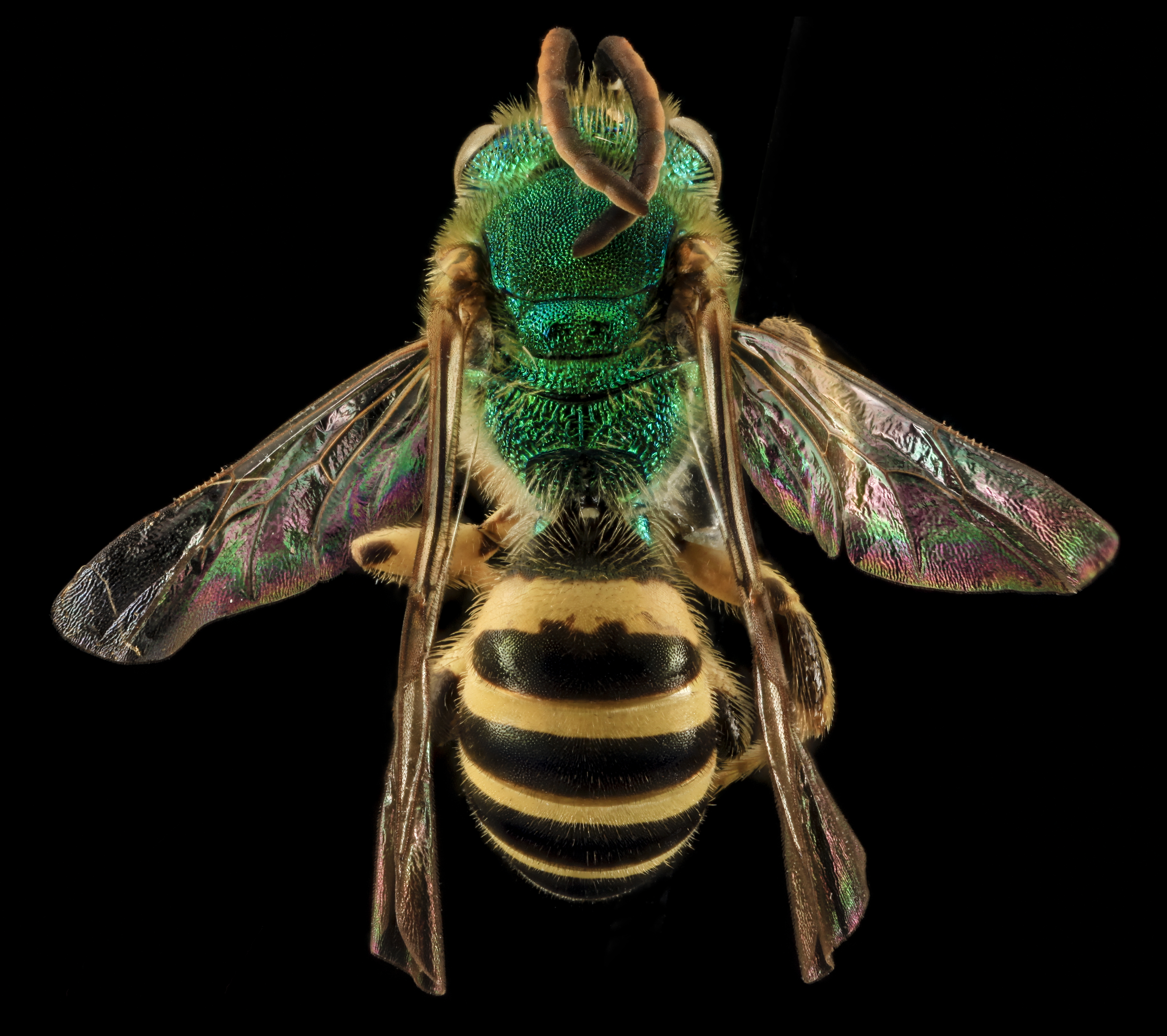
Silky striped-sweat bee, Agapostemon sericeus

== Nesting biology ==
This solitary species is not choosy about nesting sites, including moist lawns surrounded by gardens and unmowed areas, as long as flowers are available.
