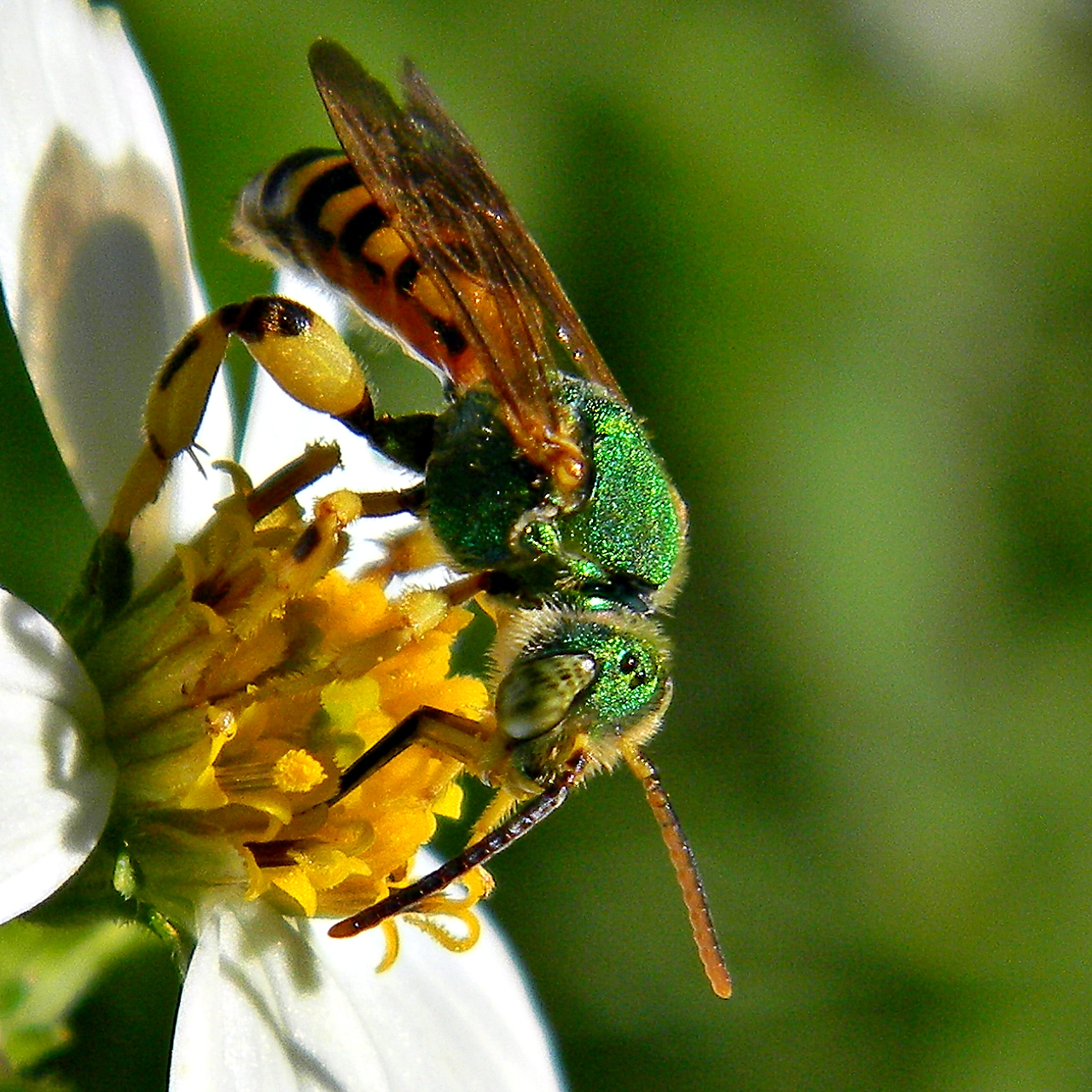

Scientific classification
- Kingdom: Animalia
- Phylum: Arthropoda
- Class: Insecta
- Order: Hymenoptera
- Family: Halictidae
- Tribe: Halictini
- Genus: Agapostemon
- Species: A. splendens

Binomial name
- Agapostemon splendens (Lepeletier, 1841)

= Agapostemon splendens =

Species of bee

Agapostemon splendens, the brown-winged striped sweat bee, is a species of sweat bee in the family Halictidae.

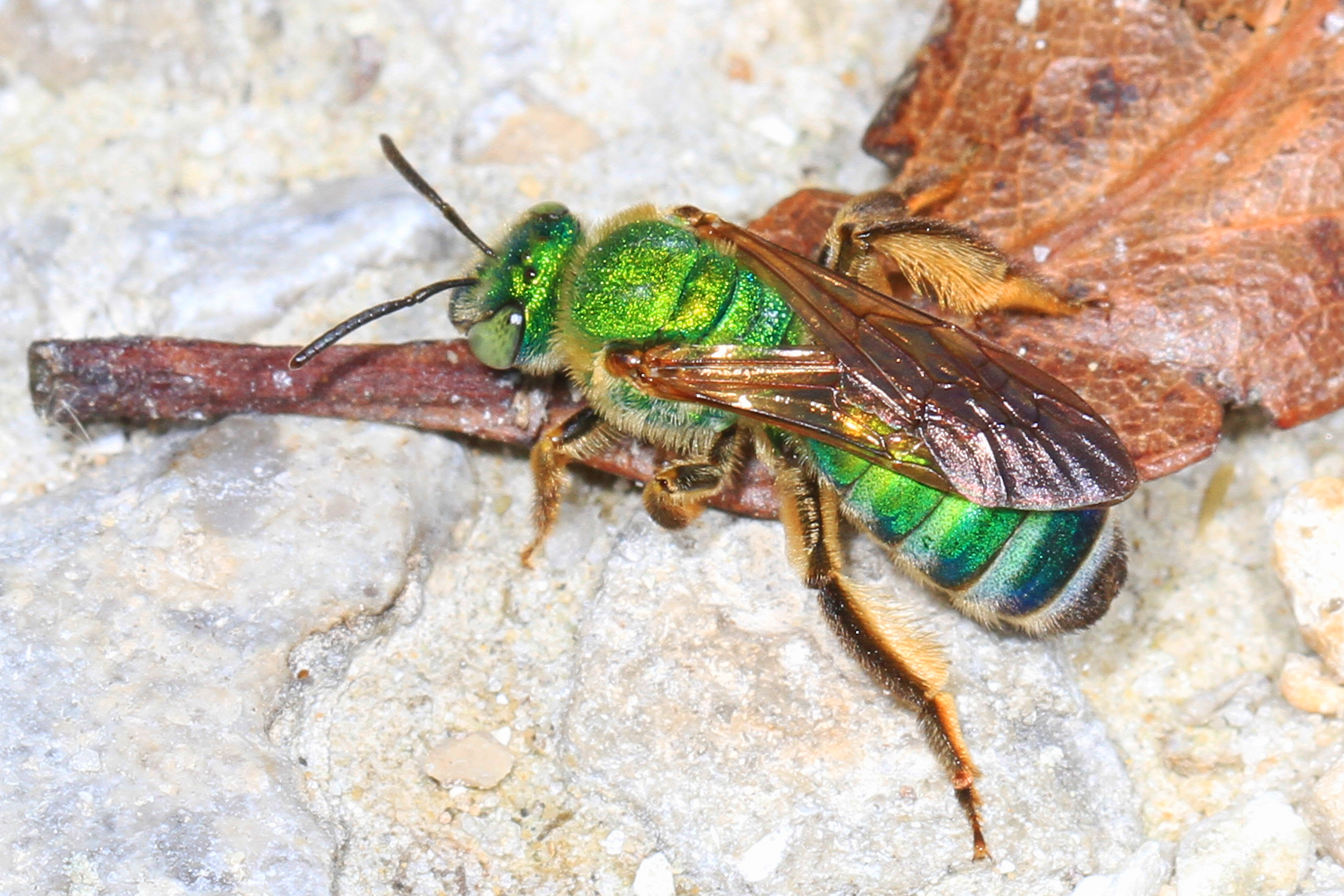
Brown-winged striped-sweat bee, Agapostemon splendens

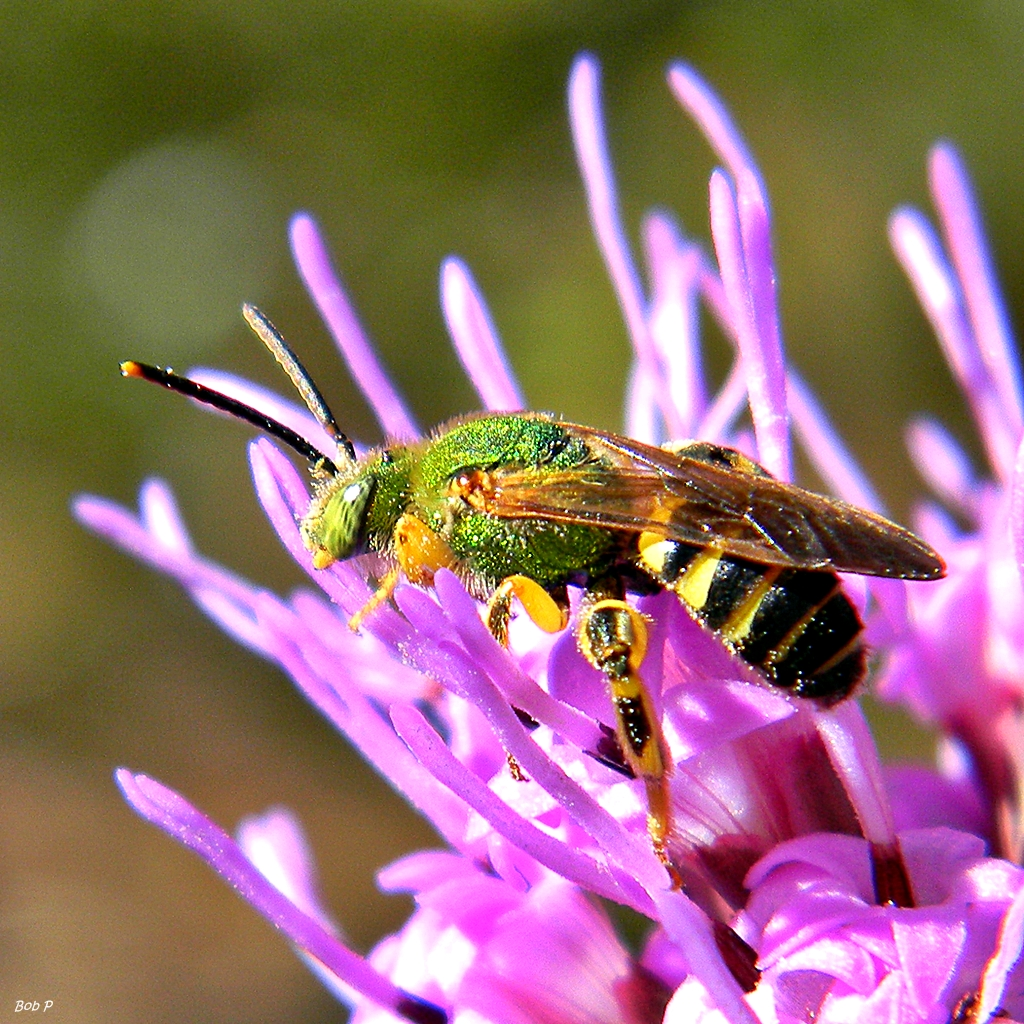
Brown-winged striped-sweat bee, Agapostemon splendens
