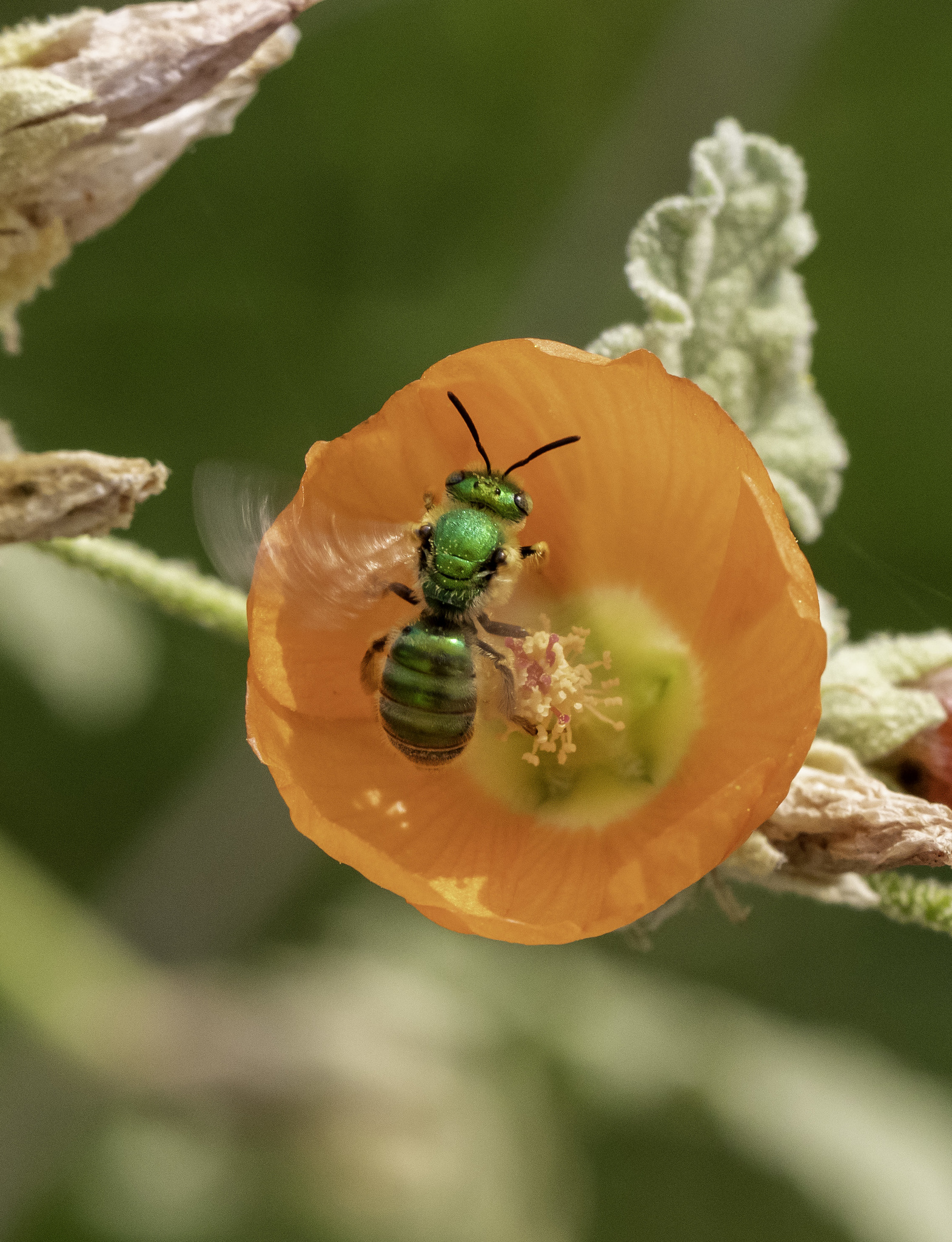
- Ventura County, California, 2020

Scientific classification
- Kingdom: Animalia
- Phylum: Arthropoda
- Class: Insecta
- Order: Hymenoptera
- Family: Halictidae
- Tribe: Halictini
- Genus: Agapostemon
- Species: A. texanus

Binomial name
- Agapostemon texanus Cresson, 1872

= Agapostemon texanus =

Species of bee

Agapostemon texanus is a species of bee found in North America. Commonly known as the metallic green sweat bee or the Texas striped sweat bee, it varies greatly in its appearance, with variations in color and in the amount of black markings on the legs.

The flight season of A. texanus ranges from March to October with their peak activity happening in May to September. They transport pollen on their hind legs.

== Range ==
A. texanus has the greatest range of any species in the genus Agapostemon. It has been documented as far north as southern Canada and as far south as Costa Rica, but is most common to the west of the Mississippi River and on the west coast of the United States. Its range in the southwest United States is interrupted in arid areas. A. texanus can tolerate a wide range of elevation, documented from sea level all the way up to 8,000 feet in California’s Sierra Nevada mountain range.

== Description ==
The head and thorax of both male and female Agapostemon texanus are variations of a bright metallic blue or green. The males can be distinguished by the black and yellow bands on their metasoma, whereas the females are all one color. The females tend to be about 11 mm in length and the males are between 9-10 mm long.

== Nesting habits ==
Agapostemon texanus is a ground nesting species that builds on both vertical banks and horizontal surfaces. Females fly close to the ground in search of ideal nesting sites and are specifically attracted to dark, hidden spots. They prefer to build in loamy soil, under pebbles and leaves or in pre-existing cracks or holes in the ground to stay hidden. A. texanus is an exclusively solitary nester, unlike the other members of its genus, which can be found in both solitary and community nests.

== Nest architecture ==
Agapostemon texanus is considered a ground nesting bee. The A. texanus nest consists of a nearly vertical tunnel with 6-14 lateral branches, each of which end in a single cell and are dug with no particular sequence. Burrows show a downwards trend in their construction, likely due to periodic deepening of the nest. The vertical tunnel can range in depth from 20-150 cm and the lateral branches can be around 5-20 cm long. The main tunnel is just large enough for the female to be able to turn around in, with a diameter of about 4 cm. The side tunnels are narrower than the main tunnel and as such are too small for the female to turn around in.

During excavation, any detritus from the digging is built up in a mound around the entrance of the nest. If undisturbed the size can range from 3-5 cm in diameter with a height of 1-3 cm high. This mound is usually dispersed by wind and other weather conditions. The entrance of the burrow is found at the center of this mound and, unlike the nests of other members of Halictinae, the entrance is not usually narrower than the main tunnel. During the night when the bee is no longer foraging, the entrance is sealed with dirt.

The lateral tunnels in the main burrow end in a cell that is many times smaller in length than the tunnel itself. This feature is unique to the Agapostemon genus. Only one side tunnel is open at a time, once finished and filled, the tunnel is packed with dirt. Each cell is about 7 by 11 mm, with an entrance slightly narrower than the width of the attached tunnel. The cell wall is coated with a salivary secretion, forming a fragile film that lines the cell. After the egg has been deposited the female seals the cell with a secretion from her anal region.

== Foraging ==
Similar to honeybees and bumblebees, A. texanus is observed to make short, direct flights between the flower it forages at and other neighboring flowers. This habit has been shown to decrease the probability of revisiting already foraged flowers. A. texanus is not observed to have a preference towards any specific flowers and is thus considered a generalist. They are recorded foraging at any flower they can during the day.

== Parasites and predators ==
Based on current research there do not appear to be any specific predators or parasites of A. texanus. The following species are observed to prey on A. texanus:

- Crab spiders (Thomisidae)
- Ambush bugs (Phymatidae)
- Philanthe wasps (Sphecidae)
- Robber flies (Asilidae)

Blister beetle (Meloidae) larvae can be commonly found on adult bees, and are also occasionally found in the cells of A. texanus.

== Gallery ==
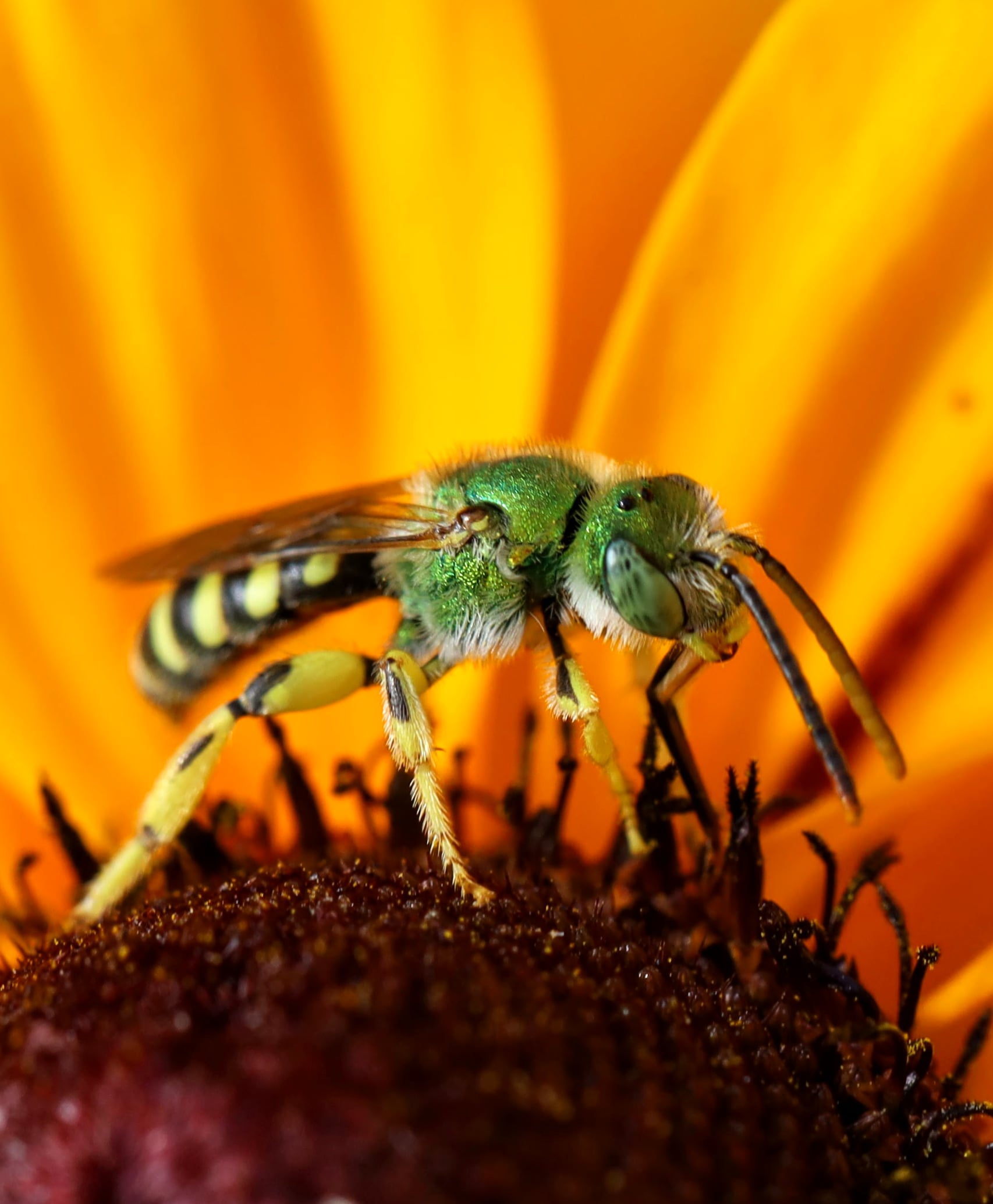
Agapostemon texanus male from Kirkland, Washington

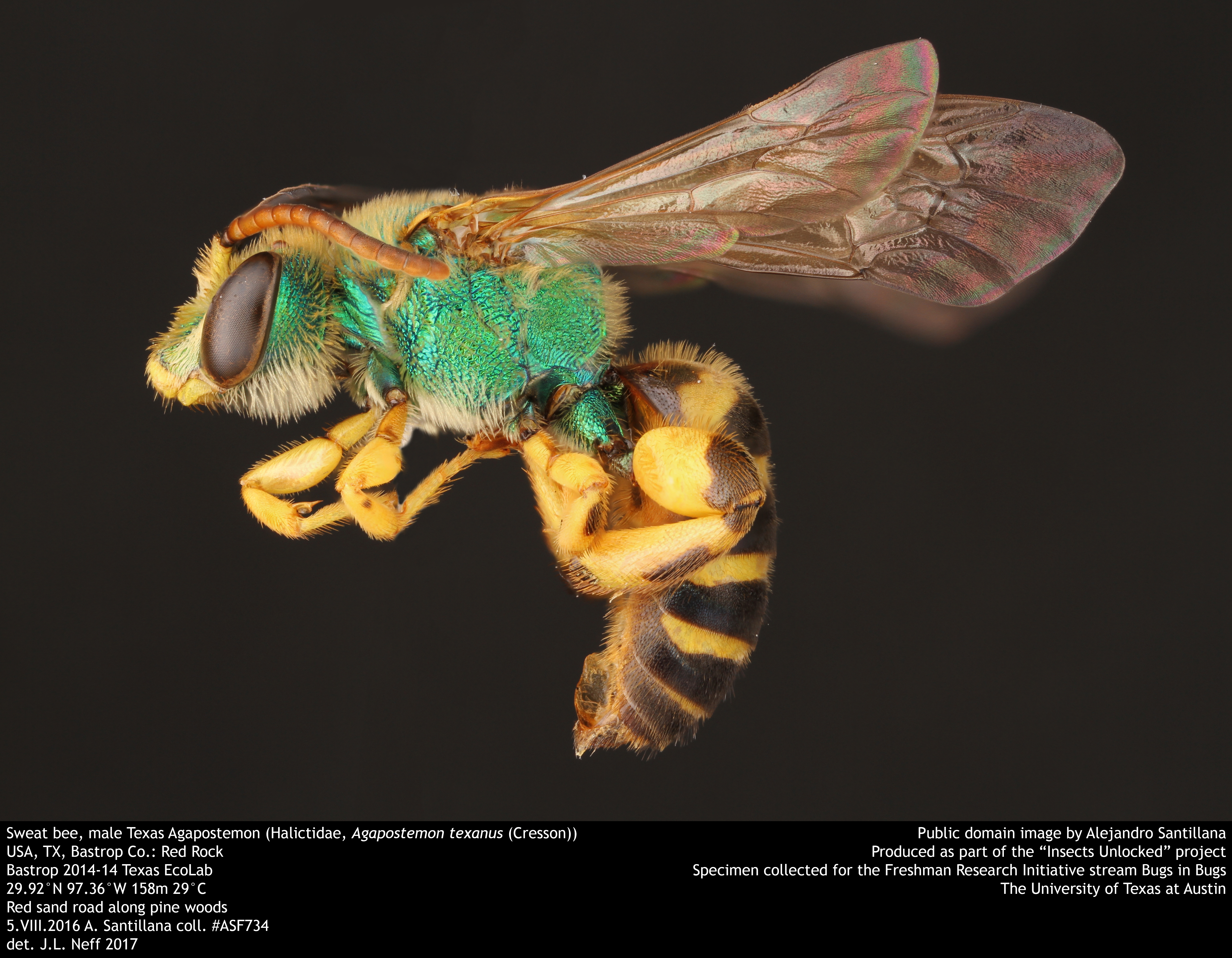
Sweat bee, male Texas Agapostemon (Halictidae, Agapostemon texanus (Cresson)) USA, TX, Bastrop Co.: Red Rock

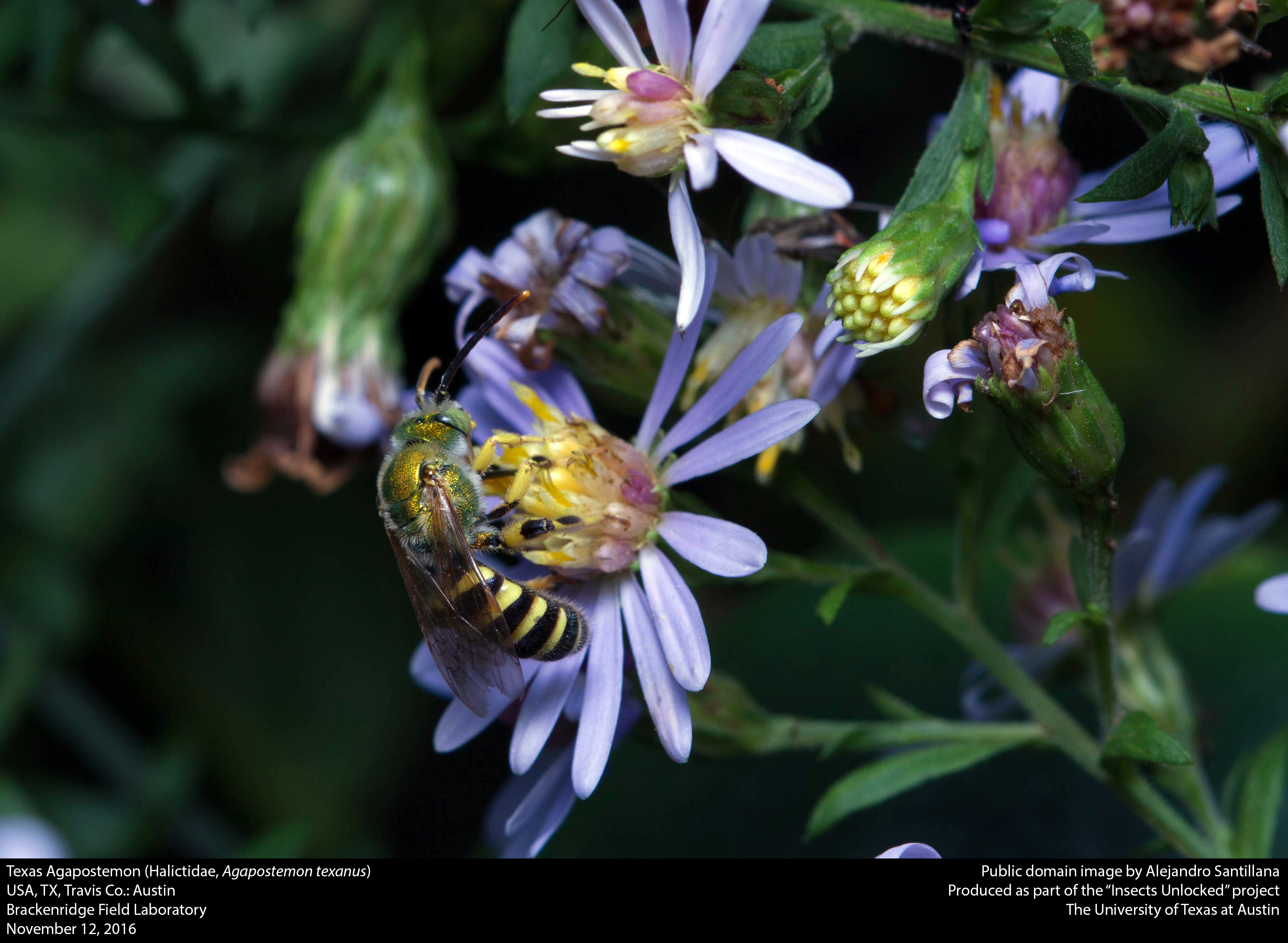
USA, TX, Travis Co.: Austin Brackenridge Field Laboratory

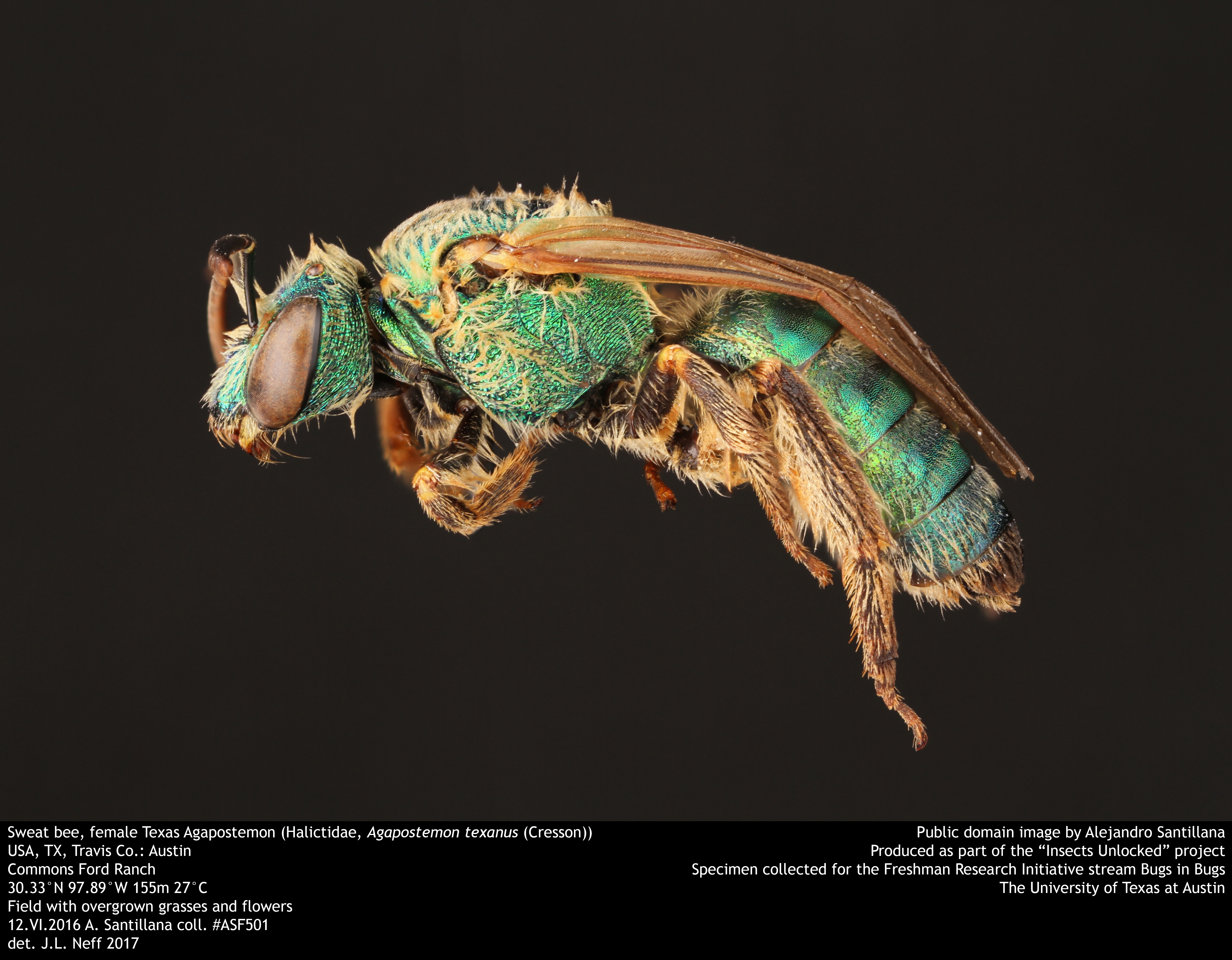
Sweat bee, female Texas Agapostemon (Halictidae, Agapostemon texanus (Cresson)) USA, TX, Travis Co.: Austin Commons Ford Ranch
