= Paragapostemon =

Scientific classification
- Kingdom: Animalia
- Phylum: Arthropoda
- Clade: Pancrustacea
- Class: Insecta
- Order: Hymenoptera
- Family: Halictidae
- Subfamily: Halictinae
- Tribe: Halictini
- Genus: Paragapostemon; Vachal, 1903
- Species: P. coelestinus

Binomial name
- Paragapostemon coelestinus (Westwood, 1875)

Genus of bees

Paragapostemon is a monotypic genus of bees belonging to the family Halictidae. The only species is Paragapostemon coelestinus, which is found in Central America.
