= Brackenridge Field Laboratory =

Research station owned by the University of Texas at Austin

Coordinates: 30.284°N 97.778°W

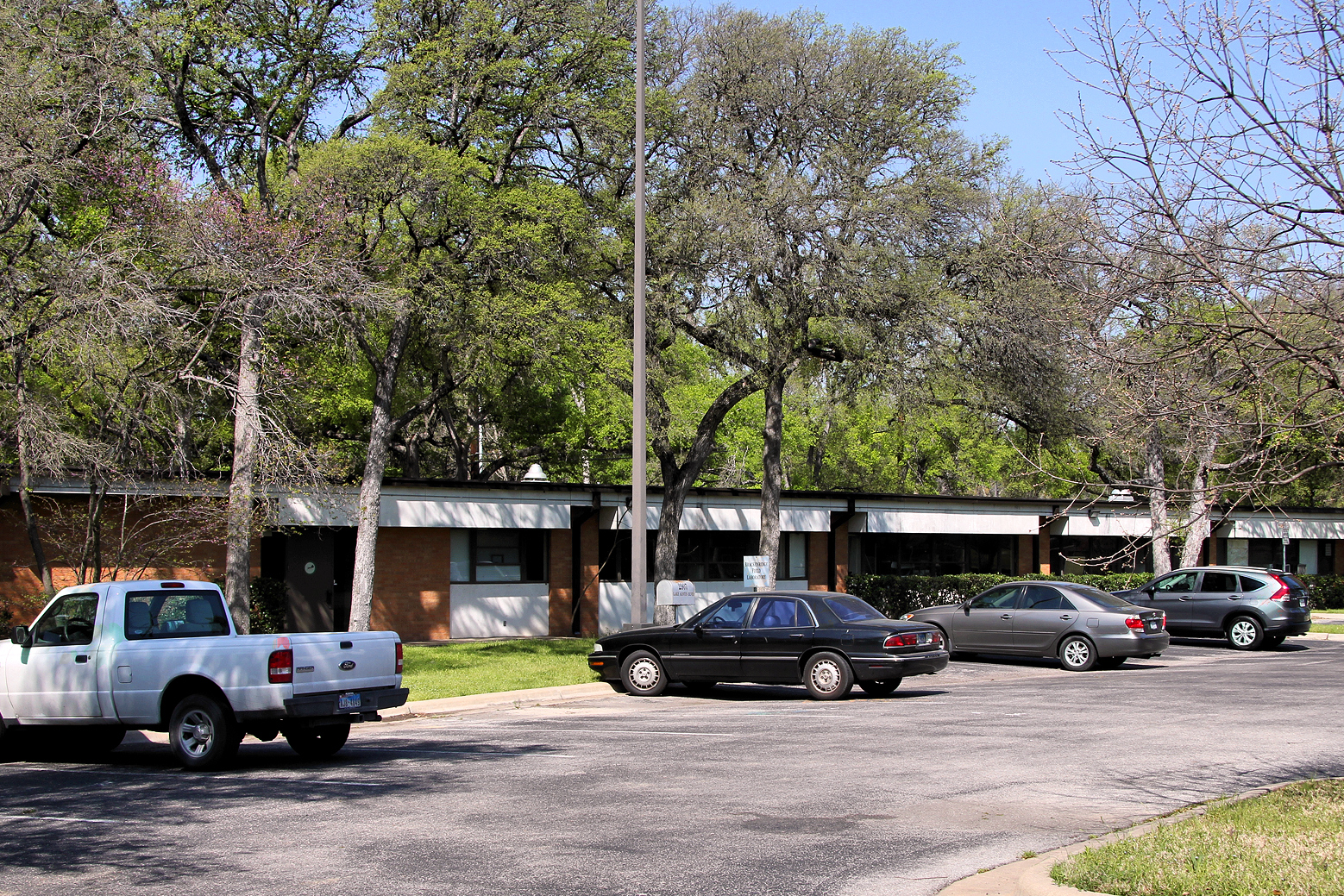
A research building at the Brackenridge Field Laboratory.

The Brackenridge Field Laboratory (BFL) is an urban research station owned by the University of Texas at Austin. Established officially in 1967, it contains 82 acres of land and research infrastructure. It is dedicated to studies in biology. The extensive historical data kept about its diverse habitats has been important to the study of biodiversity, ecological succession and ecology. Some of the key studies into the red imported fire ant (Solenopsis invicta) and potential biocontrol agents such as phorid flies have originated at the field station. It also contains the second largest insect collection in Texas. Since 1973 the Brackenridge Field Laboratory has been a subject of controversy due to the high value of the land.

In 1910, George Washington Brackenridge donated 500 acres (2.0 km^{2}) located on the Colorado River to the university. The Brackenridge Field Laboratory was established on 82 acres (330,000 m^{2}) of the land in 1967.

A satellite field station in Bastrop County (Stengl Lost Pines Biological Station) is also available for biological research and teaching.

== Entomology collection ==
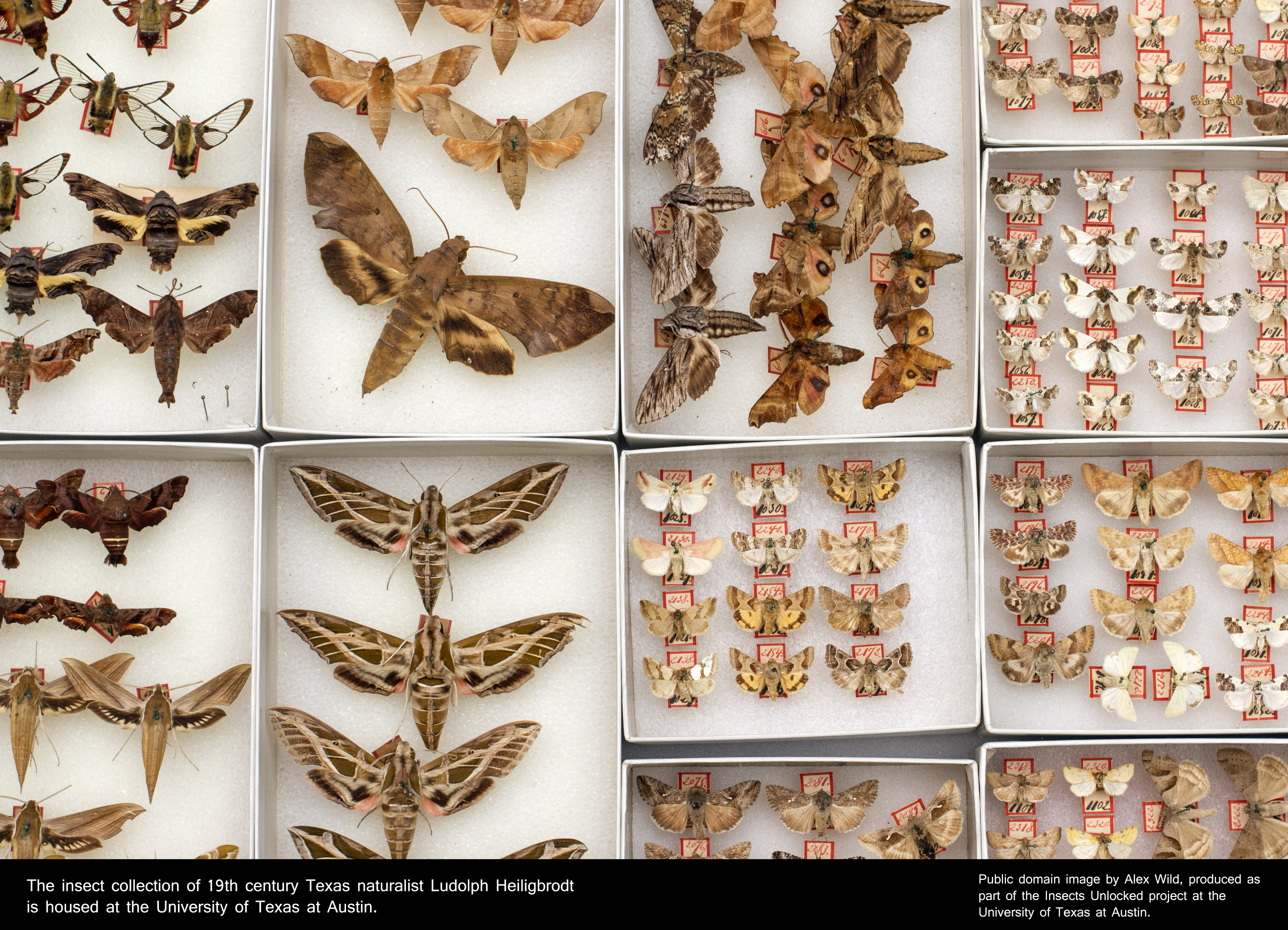
Photograph of the Ludolph Heiligbrodt Collection taken as part of the "Insects Unlocked" project

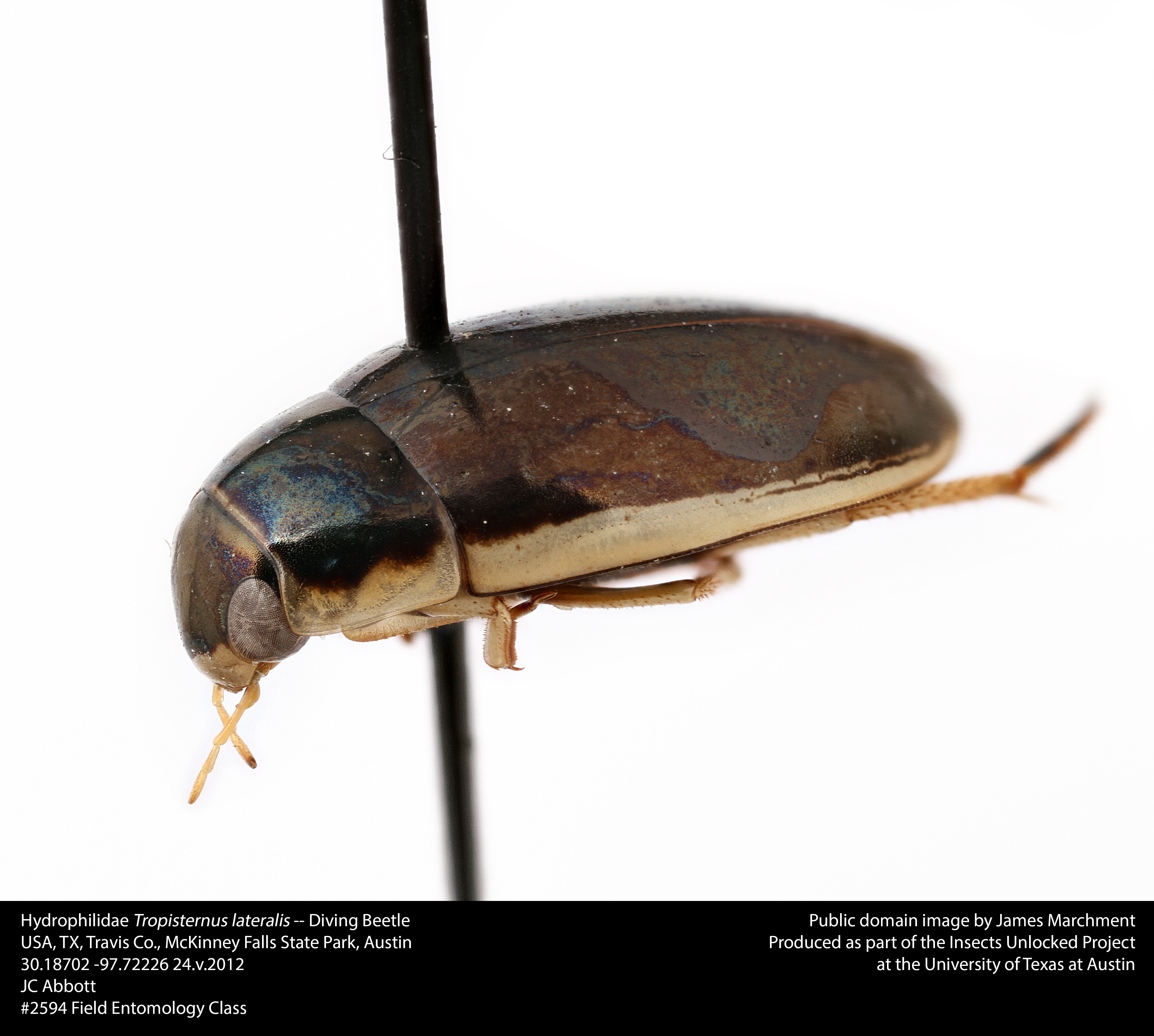
Preserved Tropisternus lateralis specimen at the collection, part of the "Insects Unlocked" project

The University of Texas's entomological collection of insects, located in the Brackenridge Field Laboratory, is the second largest of its kind in the State of Texas. Created in 2011 after the insect collection in the Texas Memorial Museum was merged with the one at the Brackenridge Field Lab, the site contains the largest man-made collection of cave-dwelling invertebrates. The curator of entomology, Alex Wild, is the only full-time researcher employed in the collection. The collection's insects are stored in groups of grey cabinets marked by orders, such as Odonata for dragonflies; each individual drawer contains multiple insects from their respective order-labeled row. Wild started an online image project known as "Insects Unlocked", which provides photographs of insects released to the public under the public domain; it has since amassed over 1,500 photographs, and Wild has said the database has seen use by government agencies. The collection's oldest insect specimens were collected in the late 19th century, part of the Ludolph Heiligbrodt Collection which ran from 1870 to 1910. According to the official website of the collection, it contains about half a million individual pinned insects and about 1,500,000 insects preserved in ethanol. Along with the Texas specimens located in the collection, there are insects housed there from other U.S. States, Canada, Mexico, South America, Central America, Europe, Africa, and Asia. Besides the large amount of insects, studies about fire ants along with specimens of insects using plants as their hosts for research can be found in the entomology collection.
