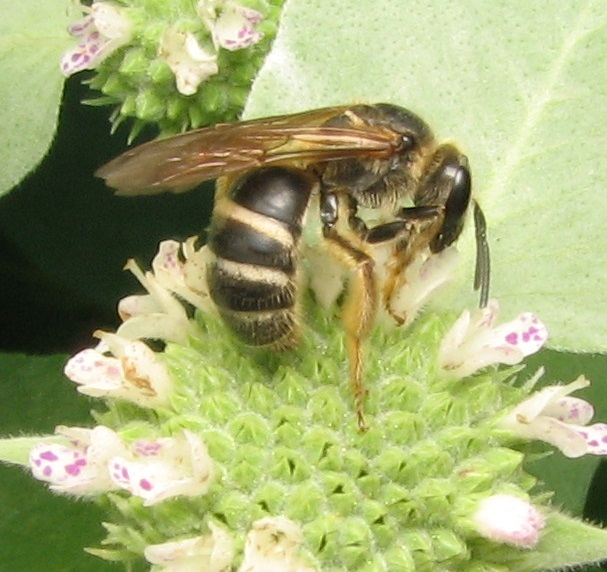
- female Lasioglossum

Scientific classification
- Kingdom: Animalia
- Phylum: Arthropoda
- Class: Insecta
- Order: Hymenoptera
- Family: Halictidae
- Subfamily: Halictinae
- Tribe: Halictini; Thomson, 1869

Genera
- See text

= Halictini =

Tribe of bees

Halictini is a tribe of sweat bees in the sub-family Halictinae.

== Genera ==
The following are included by BioLib.cz:

- Agapostemon Guérin-Ménéville, 1844
- Agapostemonoides Roberts & Brooks, 1987
- Caenohalictus Cameron, 1903
- Dinagapostemon Moure & Hurd, 1982
- Echthralictus Perkins & Cheesman, 1928
- Eupetersia Blüthgen, 1928
- Glossodialictus Pauly, 1984
- Habralictus Moure, 1941
- Halictus Latreille, 1804
- Homalictus Cockerell, 1919
- Lasioglossum Curtis, 1833
- Mexalictus Eickwort, 1978
- Microsphecodes Eickwort & Stage, 1972
- Nesosphecodes Engel, 2006
- Paragapostemon Vachal, 1903
- Parathrincostoma Blüthgen, 1933
- Patellapis Friese, 1909
- Pseudagapostemon Schrottky, 1909
- Ptilocleptis Michener, 1978
- Rhinetula Friese, 1922
- Ruizantheda Moure, 1964
- Sphecodes Latreille, 1805 (parasitic sweat bees)
- Thrinchostoma Saussure, 1890
- Thrincohalictus Blüthgen, 1955
- Urohalictus Michener, 1980
