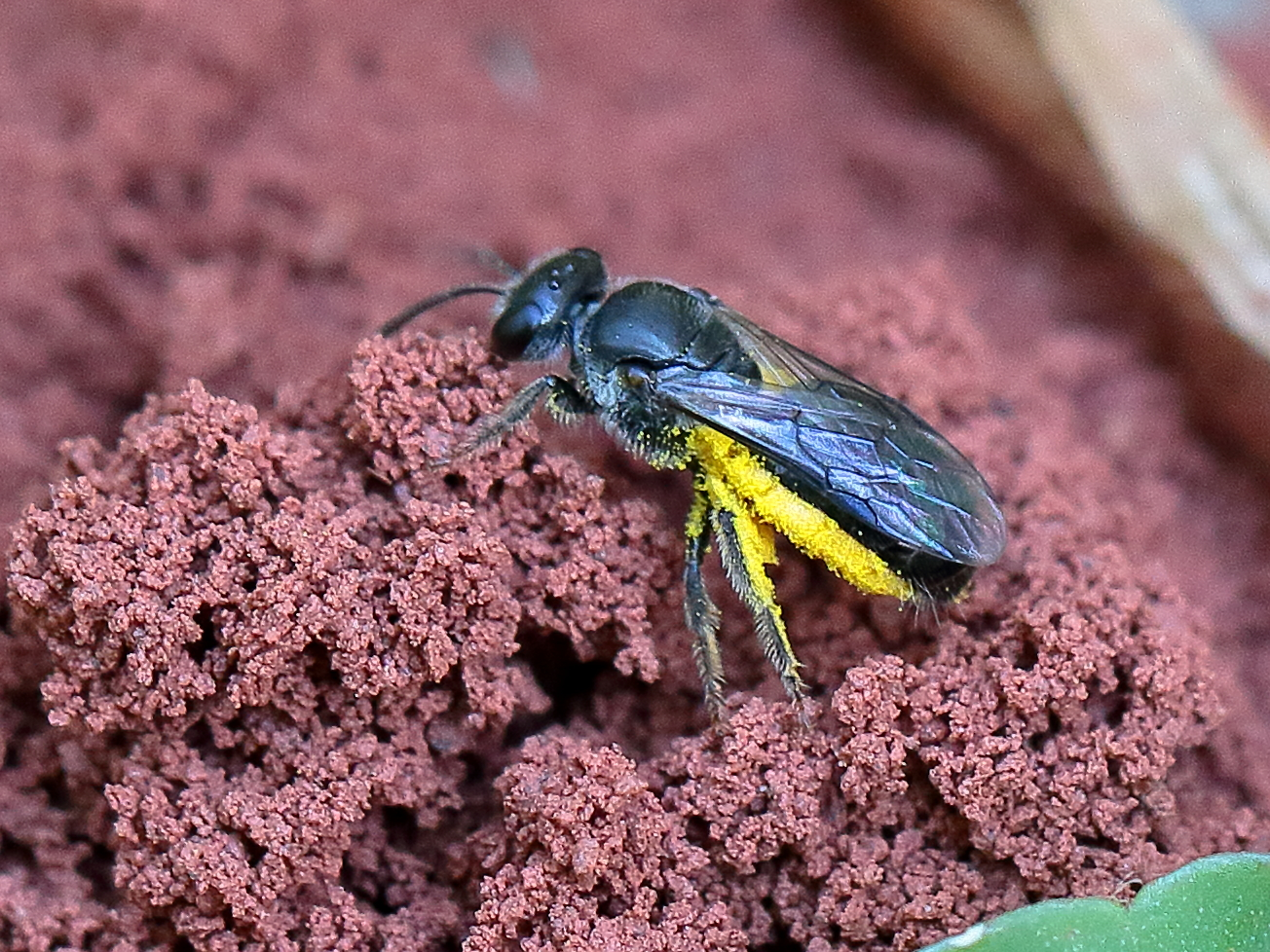

Scientific classification
- Kingdom: Animalia
- Phylum: Arthropoda
- Clade: Pancrustacea
- Class: Insecta
- Order: Hymenoptera
- Family: Halictidae
- Genus: Lasioglossum
- Subgenus: Homalictus; Cockerell, 1919

Species
- Over 150, see text

= Homalictus =

Subgenus of bees

Homalictus is a subgenus of bees in the genus Lasioglossum subfamily Halictinae of the family Halictidae. They are found in Sri Lanka, Southeast Asia, east across the Pacific to the Mariana Islands, Samoa, Fiji and are most prevalent in Australia.

Homalictus is sometimes regarded to be a full genus, but studies have shown that Homalictus is embedded within Lasioglossum, forming a clade with other Australian members of the genus.

== Species ==
The subgenus Lasioglossum (Homalictus) contains over 150 species including the following (list incomplete):

- Homalictus achrostus Michener, 1979
- Lasioglossum adiazetus (Walker, 1997)
- Lasioglossum andrewsi (W.F. Kirby, 1900)
- Homalictus atritergus Dorey, Schwarz & Stevens, 2019
- Lasioglossum atrus (Walker, 1986)
- Lasioglossum behri (Cockerell, 1910)
- Lasioglossum blackburni (Cockerell, 1910)
- Lasioglossum bremerense (Rayment, 1931)
- Lasioglossum brevicornutum (Walker, 1986)
- Lasioglossum brisbanense (Cockerell, 1918)
- Lasioglossum callaspis (Cockerell, 1915)
- Lasioglossum caloundrense (Cockerell, 1914)
- Lasioglossum cassiaefloris (Cockerell, 1914)
- Homalictus concavus Dorey, Schwarz & Stevens, 2019
- Lasioglossum ctenander Michener, 1965
- Lasioglossum dampieri (Cockerell, 1905)
- Lasioglossum dotatum (Cockerell, 1912)
- Lasioglossum eurhodopus (Cockerell, 1914)
- Lasioglossum exlautum (Cockerell, 1905)
- Lasioglossum exleyae (Walker, 1986)
- Lasioglossum exophthalmus (Walker, 1986)
- Homalictus fijiensis (Perkins & Cheesman, 1928)
- Lasioglossum flindersi (Cockerell, 1905)
- Lasioglossum forrestae (Walker, 1986)
- Homalictus groomi Dorey, Schwarz & Stevens, 2019
- Lasioglossum grossopedalum (Walker, 1986)
- Lasioglossum holochlorum (Cockerell, 1914)
- Lasioglossum houstoni (Walker, 1986)
- Lasioglossum imitatum (Walker, 1986)
- Homalictus kaicolo Dorey, Schwarz & Stevens, 2019
- Lasioglossum latitarse (Friese, 1909)
- Lasioglossum luteoaeneum (Friese, 1924)
- Lasioglossum maitlandi (Cockerell, 1910)
- Lasioglossum mataroa (Donovan, 2007)
- Lasioglossum megagnathum (Walker, 1997)
- Lasioglossum megastigmum (Cockerell, 1926)
- Lasioglossum multicavum (Walker, 1986)
- Lasioglossum murrayi (Cockerell, 1905)
- Homalictus nadarivatu Dorey, Schwarz & Stevens, 2019
- Lasioglossum nivefrons (Cockerell, 1914)
- Homalictus ostridorsum Dorey, Schwarz & Stevens, 2019
- Lasioglossum pectinalum (Walker, 1986)
- Lasioglossum pilosigyna (Walker, 1997)
- Lasioglossum rowlandi (Cockerell, 1910)
- Lasioglossum scrupulosum (Cockerell, 1930)
- Lasioglossum sicarius (Walker, 1997)
- Lasioglossum sphecodoides (Smith, 1853)
- Lasioglossum sphecodopsis (Cockerell, 1905)
- Lasioglossum stradbrokense (Cockerell, 1916)
- Lasioglossum tasmaniae (Cockerell, 1905)
- Lasioglossum tatei (Cockerell, 1910)
- Homalictus taveuni Dorey, Schwarz & Stevens, 2019
- Homalictus terminalis Dorey, Schwarz & Stevens, 2019
- Lasioglossum thor (Cockerell, 1929)
- Homalictus tuiwawae Dorey, Schwarz & Stevens, 2019
- Lasioglossum urbanum (Smith, 1879)
- Homalictus versifrons (Perkins & Cheesman, 1928)
- Lasioglossum verticulum (Walker, 1997)
- Lasioglossum woodsi (Cockerell, 1910)
