= Lasioglossum punctatum =

Scientific classification
- Kingdom: Animalia
- Phylum: Arthropoda
- Clade: Pancrustacea
- Class: Insecta
- Order: Hymenoptera
- Family: Halictidae
- Genus: Lasioglossum
- Subgenus: Ctenonomia
- Species: L. punctatum

Binomial name
- Lasioglossum punctatum (Smith, 1858)

Synonyms
- Nomia punctata Smith, 1858

Species of insect

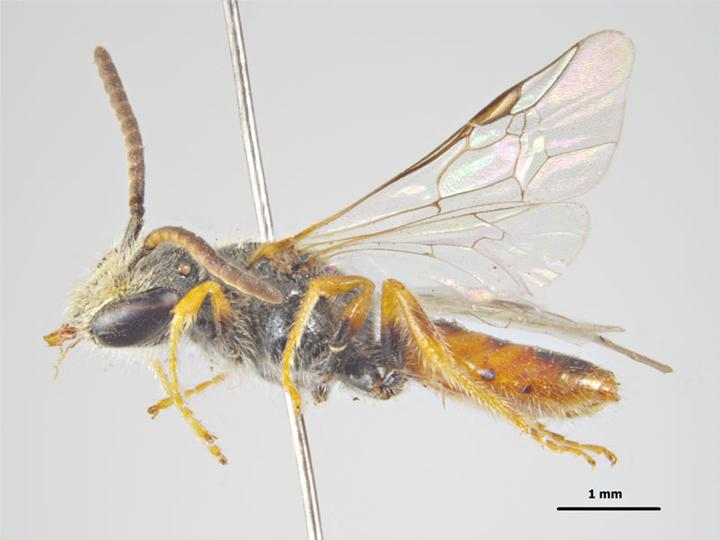
Lasioglossum punctatum at the Museum Victoria

Lasioglossum punctatum is a species of halictid bee found in Indonesia. It was first described in 1858 as Nomia punctata.

The same name was later applied to an Australian bee described in 1879. As a junior homonym, that species required renaming and is now considered Lasioglossum exlautum.
