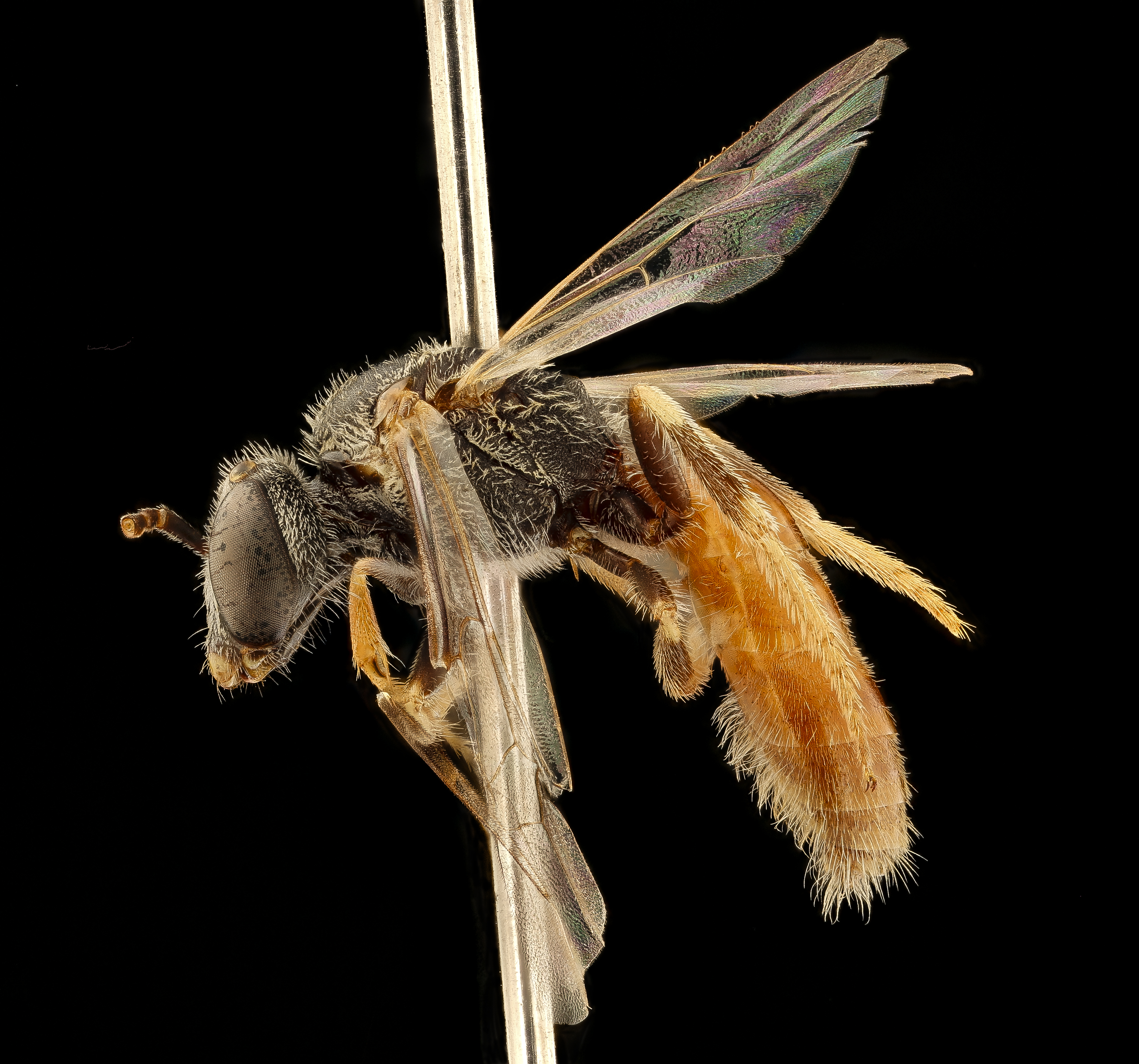

Scientific classification
- Kingdom: Animalia
- Phylum: Arthropoda
- Clade: Pancrustacea
- Class: Insecta
- Order: Hymenoptera
- Family: Halictidae
- Genus: Lasioglossum
- Species: L. texanum

Binomial name
- Lasioglossum texanum (Cresson, 1872)

= Lasioglossum texanum =

Species of bee

Lasioglossum texanum is a species of sweat bee in the family Halictidae. It is a ground nesting bee that flies out to collect pollen in the evening and also at night until around 10:00 PM when the moon is up. It only collects pollen from the flowers of the four-point evening-primrose (Oenothera rhombipetala).
