= Ixodia =

Ixodia may refer to:

- Ixodia (bird), a genus of bird in the family Pycnonotidae
- Ixodia (plant), a genus of plants in the family Asteraceae
