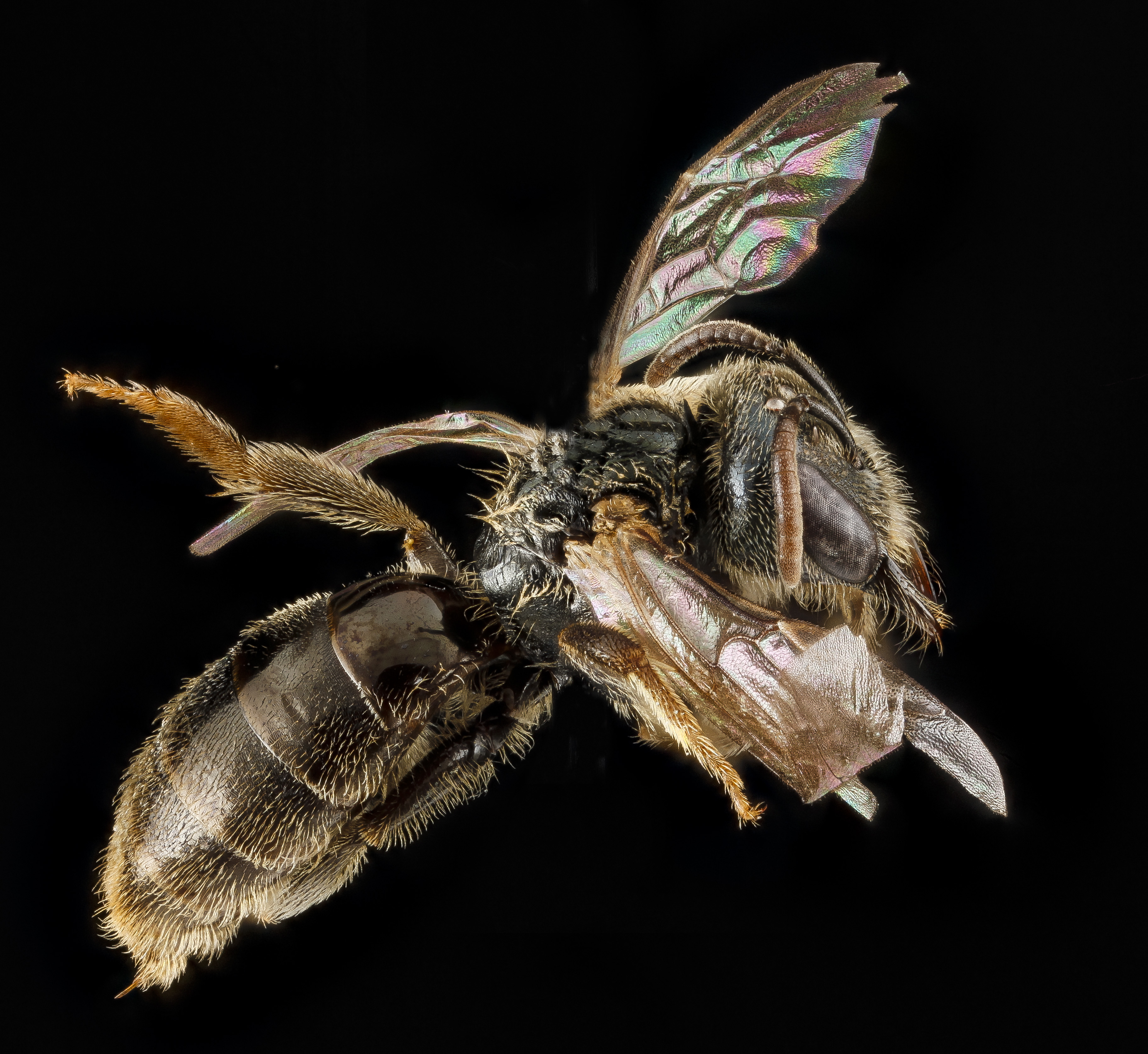

Scientific classification
- Domain: Eukaryota
- Kingdom: Animalia
- Phylum: Arthropoda
- Class: Insecta
- Order: Hymenoptera
- Family: Halictidae
- Tribe: Halictini
- Genus: Lasioglossum
- Species: L. lionotum

Binomial name
- Lasioglossum lionotum ANNANDALE, 1905

= Lasioglossum lionotum =

Species of bee

Lasioglossum lionotum is a species of Lasioglossum in the Halictidae family.
