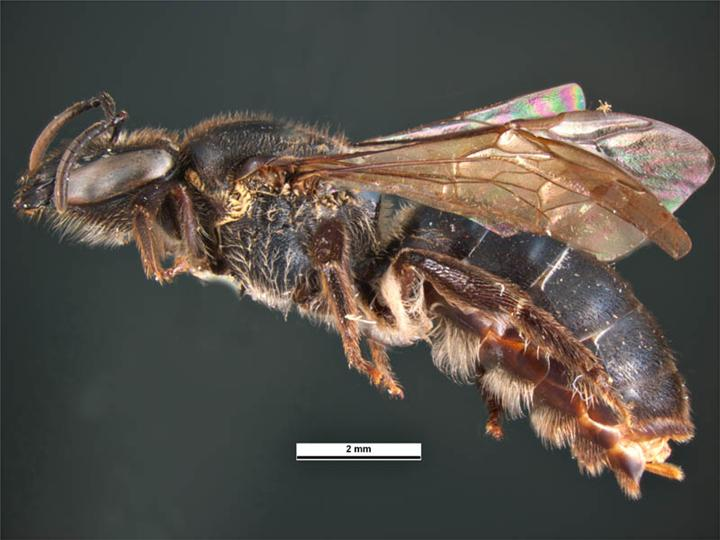

Scientific classification
- Kingdom: Animalia
- Phylum: Arthropoda
- Clade: Pancrustacea
- Class: Insecta
- Order: Hymenoptera
- Family: Halictidae
- Genus: Lasioglossum
- Species: L. davide

Binomial name
- Lasioglossum davide (Cockerell, 1910)

= Lasioglossum davide =

Species of bee

Lasioglossum halictoides, also known as the Lasioglossum (Australictus) davide , is a species of bee in the subgenus Australictus of the genus Lasioglossum, in the Halictidae family. It was first described in 1910 by Theodore Dru Alison Cockerell as Halictus davidis, from a specimen collected at Kuranda, Queensland.
