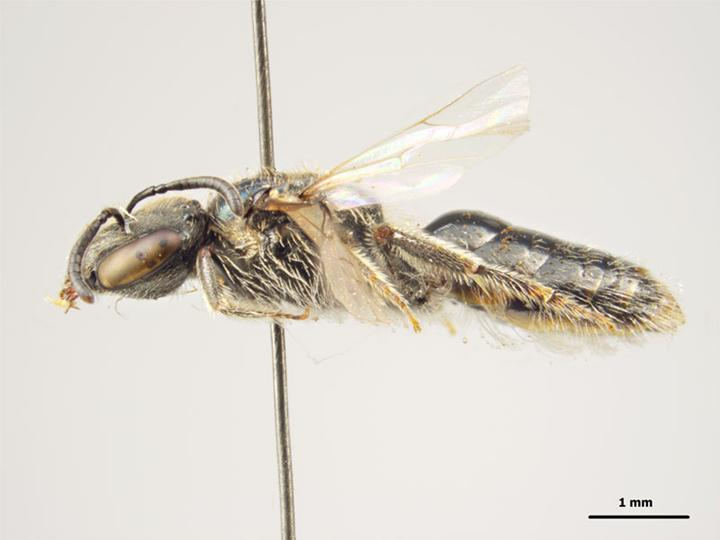
- Female

Scientific classification
- Kingdom: Animalia
- Phylum: Arthropoda
- Clade: Pancrustacea
- Class: Insecta
- Order: Hymenoptera
- Family: Halictidae
- Genus: Lasioglossum
- Species: L. sphecodoides

Binomial name
- Lasioglossum sphecodoides Smith, 1853

Synonyms
- Halictus sphecodoides Smith, 1853; Halictus limatus Smith, 1853; Halictus humilis Smith, 1879; Halictus burkei Cockerell, 1906; Halictus demissus Cockerell, 1916; Halictus limatiformis Cockerell, 1922; Halictus humiliformis Cockerell, 1922

= Lasioglossum sphecodoides =

Species of bee

Lasioglossum sphecodoides, or Lasioglossum (Homalictus) sphecodoides, is a species of bee in the family Halictidae and subfamily Halictinae. It is endemic to Australia. It was described by English entomologist Frederick Smith in 1853.

== Distribution and habitat ==
The species occurs across much of southern Australia. Type localities include Geraldton in Western Australia, the Lamington National Park in south-east Queensland, Ebor in New South Wales, as well as Hobart and Launceston in Tasmania.

== Behaviour ==
The adults are flying mellivores. They nest communally and gregariously in soil, and have sedentary larvae. Flowering plants visited by the bees include Acacia, Arctotheca, Banksia, Brachyscome, Brassica, Bursaria, Cotoneaster, Eucalyptus, Gastrolobium, Goodenia, Helichrysum, Helipterum, Hypochaeris, Ixodia, Jacksonia, Lagunaria, Leptospermum, Melaleuca, Schinus, Taraxacum, Veronica and Wahlenbergia species.

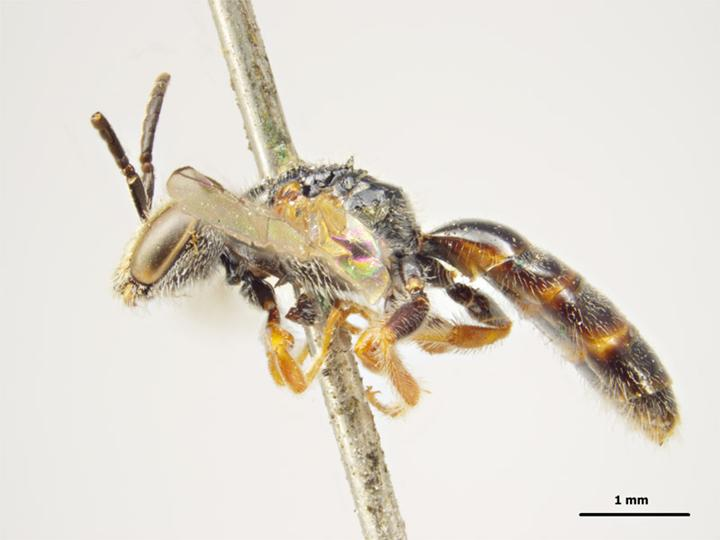
Male
