= Lasioglossum luteoaeneum =

Scientific classification
- Kingdom: Animalia
- Phylum: Arthropoda
- Clade: Pancrustacea
- Class: Insecta
- Order: Hymenoptera
- Family: Halictidae
- Genus: Lasioglossum
- Species: L. luteoaeneum

Binomial name
- Lasioglossum luteoaeneum (Friese, 1924)

Synonyms
- Halictus luteoaeneus Friese, 1924

Species of bee

Lasioglossum luteoaeneum, or Lasioglossum (Homalictus) luteoaeneum, is a species of bee in the family Halictidae and subfamily Halictinae. It is endemic to Australia. It was described by German entomologist Heinrich Friese in 1924.

== Distribution and habitat ==
The species occurs in eastern Australia. The type locality is Victoria, without further site precision.

== Behaviour ==
The adults are flying mellivores.
