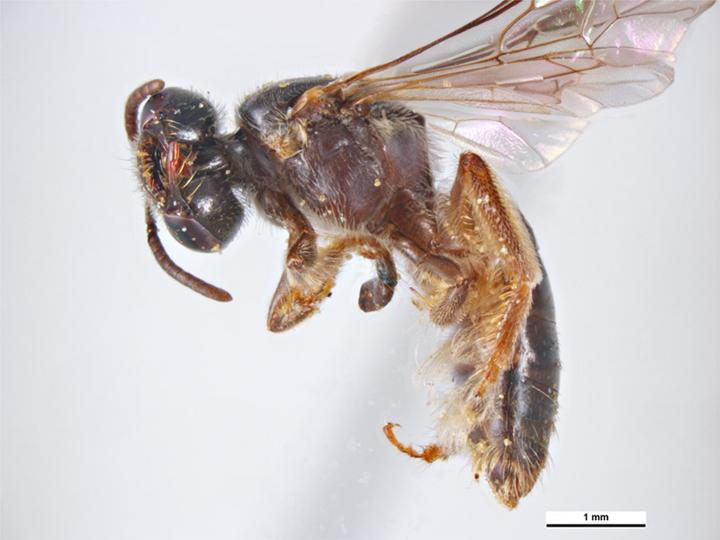
- Female

Scientific classification
- Kingdom: Animalia
- Phylum: Arthropoda
- Clade: Pancrustacea
- Class: Insecta
- Order: Hymenoptera
- Family: Halictidae
- Genus: Lasioglossum
- Species: L. latitarse

Binomial name
- Lasioglossum latitarse (Friese, 1909)

Synonyms
- Halictus latitarsis Friese, 1909; Halictus caroli Cockerell, 1919; Halictus mcgregori Cockerell, 1919

= Lasioglossum latitarse =

Species of bee

Lasioglossum latitarse, or Lasioglossum (Homalictus) latitarse, is a species of bee in the family Halictidae and subfamily Halictinae. It was described by German entomologist Heinrich Friese in 1909.

== Distribution and habitat ==
The species is native to Australia, New Guinea, the Bismarck Archipelago and the Philippines.

== Behaviour ==
The adults are flying mellivores. Flowering plants visited by the bees include Tristaniopsis species.

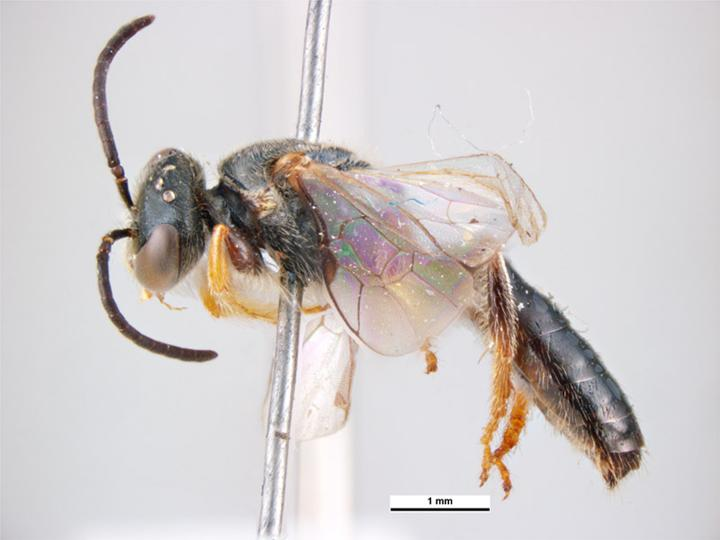
Male
