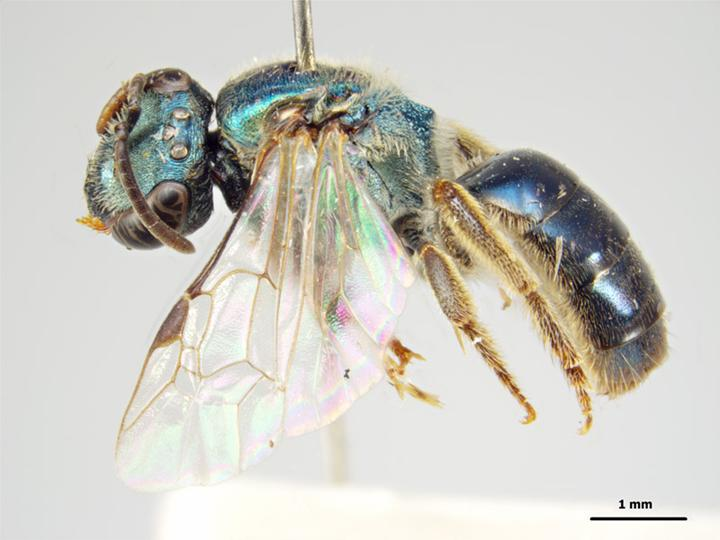
- Female
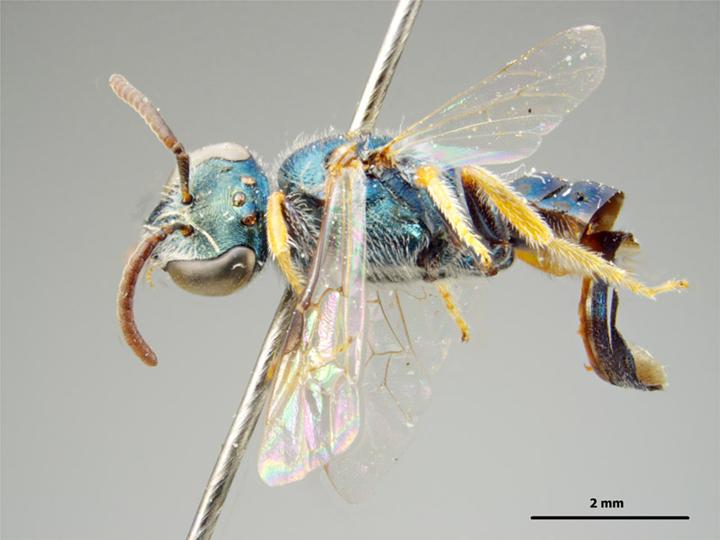
- Male

Scientific classification
- Kingdom: Animalia
- Phylum: Arthropoda
- Clade: Pancrustacea
- Class: Insecta
- Order: Hymenoptera
- Family: Halictidae
- Genus: Lasioglossum
- Species: L. woodsi

Binomial name
- Lasioglossum woodsi (Cockerell, 1910)

Synonyms
- Halictus woodsi Cockerell, 1910; Halictus behri transvolans Cockerell, 1912

= Lasioglossum woodsi =

Species of bee

Lasioglossum woodsi, or Lasioglossum (Homalictus) woodsi, is a species of bee in the family Halictidae and subfamily Halictinae. It is endemic to Australia. It was described by British-American entomologist Theodore Dru Alison Cockerell in 1910.

== Description ==
Female body length is about 6.5 mm, male 5 mm. Integumental colouration is mainly black and green to greenish, with red markings.

== Distribution and habitat ==
The species occurs in tropical northern Australia. Type localities include Cooktown, Queensland and Mackay, Queensland. It has also been recorded from Port Darwin in the Northern Territory.

== Behaviour ==
The adults are flying mellivores. Flowering plants visited by the bees include Spermacoce, Eucalyptus, Eugenia and Melaleuca species.
