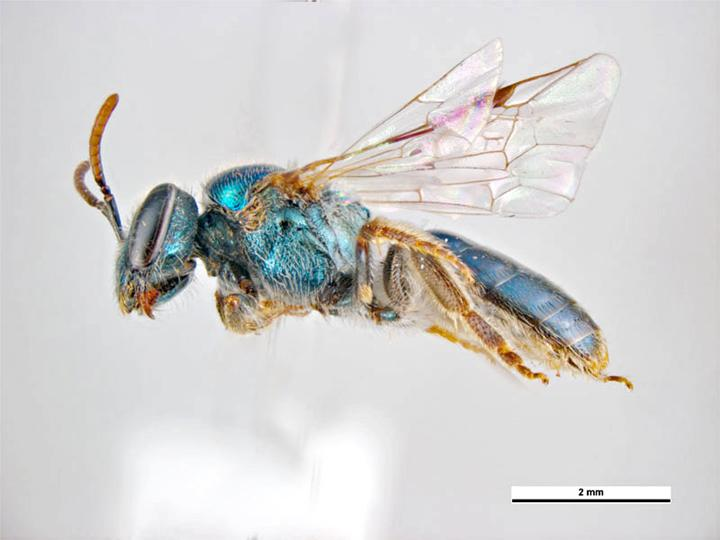
- Female

Scientific classification
- Kingdom: Animalia
- Phylum: Arthropoda
- Clade: Pancrustacea
- Class: Insecta
- Order: Hymenoptera
- Family: Halictidae
- Genus: Lasioglossum
- Species: L. flindersi

Binomial name
- Lasioglossum flindersi (Cockerell, 1905)

Synonyms
- Halictus flindersi Cockerell, 1905; Halictus hilli Cockerell, 1929

= Lasioglossum flindersi =

Species of bee

Lasioglossum flindersi, or Lasioglossum (Homalictus) flindersi, is a species of bee in the family Halictidae and subfamily Halictinae. It is endemic to Australia. It was described by British-American entomologist Theodore Dru Alison Cockerell in 1905.

== Description ==
Female body length is about 6 mm, male body length 5 mm. Integumental colouration is mainly glossy purple-blue, with peacock-green markings.

== Distribution and habitat ==
The species occurs in tropical northern and north-eastern Australia. Type localities include Darwin, Northern Territory, as well as Mackay, Queensland.

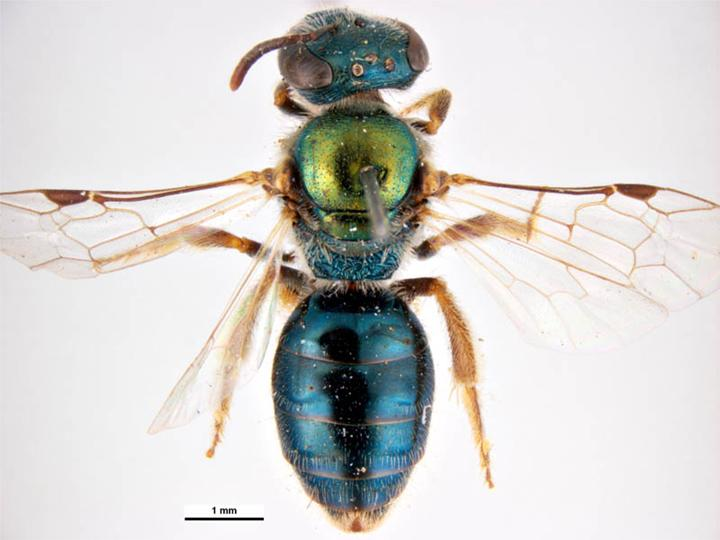
Female, dorsal view

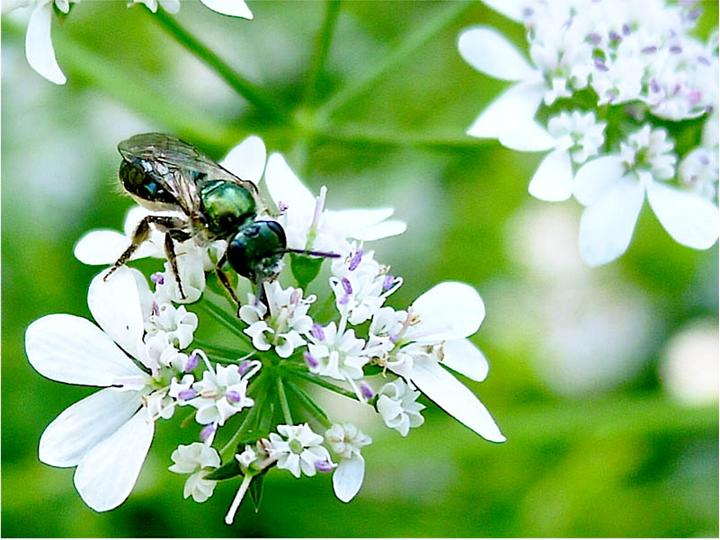
Female on coriander flowers

== Behaviour ==
The adults are flying mellivores. Flowering plants visited by the bees include Acacia, Pogostemon, Eucalyptus, Hibiscus, Melaleuca, Parinari, Pongamia and Tournefortia species.

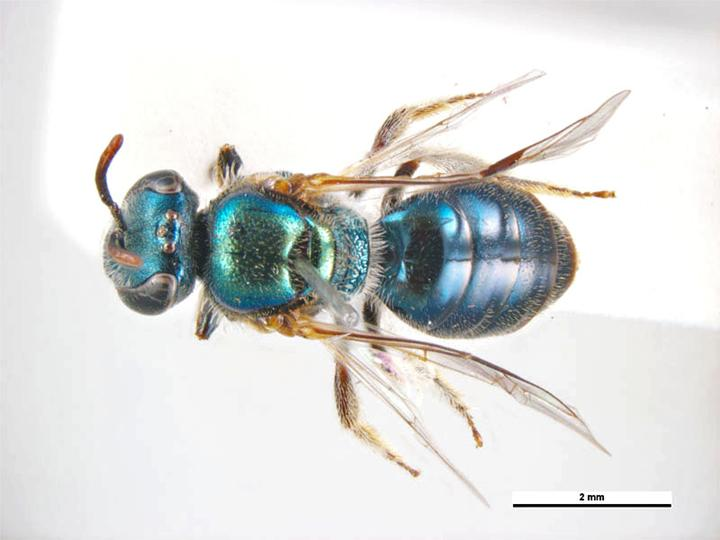
Male
