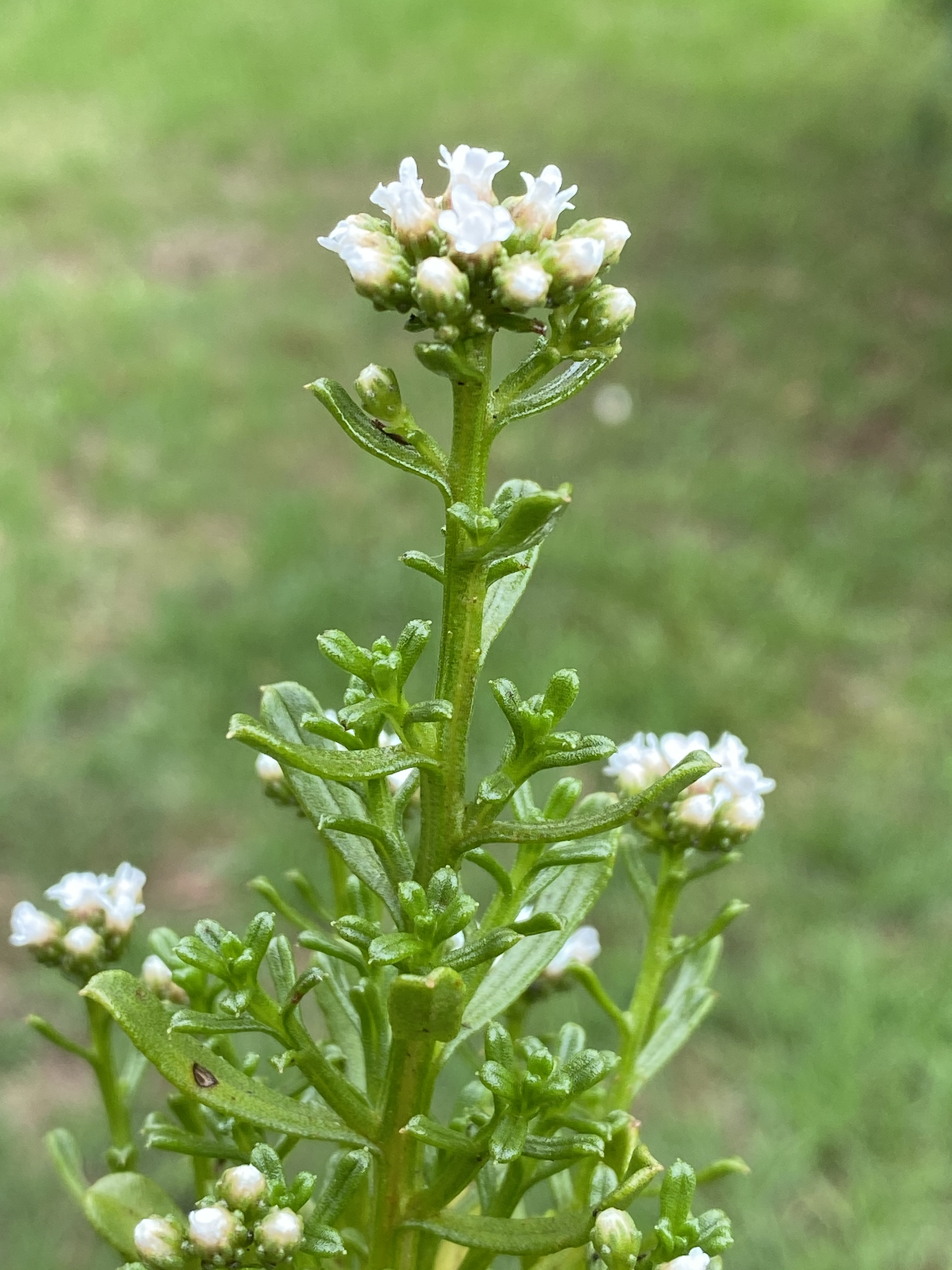

Scientific classification
- Kingdom: Plantae
- Clade: Tracheophytes
- Clade: Angiosperms
- Clade: Eudicots
- Clade: Asterids
- Order: Asterales
- Family: Asteraceae
- Genus: Ixodia
- Species: I. achillaeoides

Binomial name
- Ixodia achillaeoides R.Br.

= Ixodia achillaeoides =

Species of flowering plant

Ixodia achillaeoides, commonly known as mountain daisy, is a species of flowering plant in the family Asteraceae and is found in South Australia and Victoria. It is a small shrub with sticky, smooth branchlets and small white flowers in spring and summer.

== Description ==
Ixodia achillaeoides is a small understory shrub up to 10–200 cm (3.9–78.7 in) high, stems smooth, sticky and branched. The leaves are variable from linear to egg-shaped, sticky, 5–100 mm (0.20–3.94 in) long, decurrent, dark green on upper surface, paler on the underside and a prominent mid-vein. The inflorescence is an urn-shaped to oval-shaped cluster of 3-80 white flowers with yellow centres at the end of stems. Individual flowers 3–9 mm (0.12–0.35 in) long and 1–8 mm (0.039–0.315 in) in diameter, sessile or on a short peduncle. The fruit is a cypsela 1.5–2.5 mm (0.059–0.098 in) long and covered with soft hairs. Flowering mostly occurs in spring and summer.

== Taxonomy and naming ==
Ixodia achillaeoides was first formally described in 1812 by Robert Brown and the description was published in Hortus Kewensis. The specific epithet (achilleoides) refers to the similarity of the inflorescence to those of plants in the genus Achillea.

== Distribution and habitat ==
This species has a scattered distribution in Victoria. A widespread species in South Australia, occurring in woodland, scrubland and forest.
