= Parasphecodes =

Scientific classification
- Kingdom: Animalia
- Phylum: Arthropoda
- Clade: Pancrustacea
- Class: Insecta
- Order: Hymenoptera
- Family: Halictidae
- Genus: Lasioglossum
- Subgenus: Parasphecodes; Smith,1853

Subgenus of bees

Parasphecodes is a subgenus of the bee genus Lasioglossum, which is in the family Halictidae. It comprises 40 species, including 1 from New Guinea and 39 from Australia (absent from Northern Territory). Body length ranges from 5–11.3mm. About half of the species have a black head and thorax with a reddish abdomen. Males have relatively slender bodies, longer antennae and yellow on the clypeus. This subgenus was revised in 2024 by Ken Walker and Kathryn Sparks.
