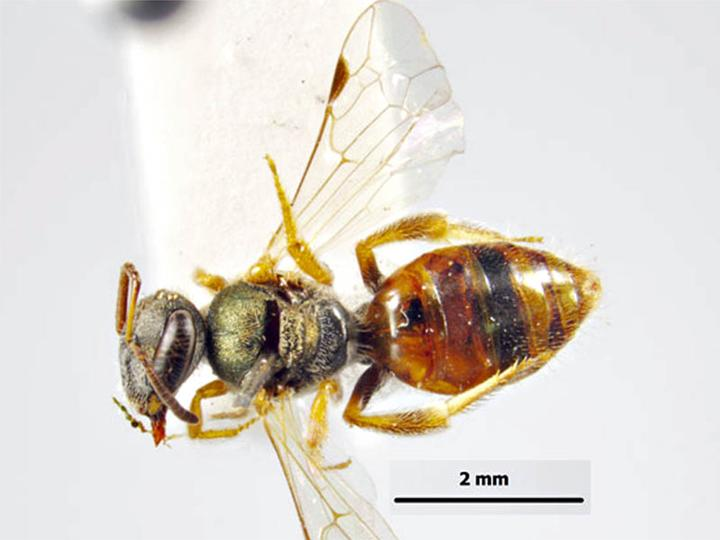
- Female

Scientific classification
- Kingdom: Animalia
- Phylum: Arthropoda
- Clade: Pancrustacea
- Class: Insecta
- Order: Hymenoptera
- Family: Halictidae
- Genus: Lasioglossum
- Species: L. tatei

Binomial name
- Lasioglossum tatei (Cockerell, 1910)

Synonyms
- Halictus (Chloralictus) tatei Cockerell, 1910; Halictus saycei Cockerell, 1912

= Lasioglossum tatei =

Species of bee

Lasioglossum tatei, or Lasioglossum (Homalictus) tatei, is a species of bee in the family Halictidae and subfamily Halictinae. It is endemic to Australia. It was described by British-American entomologist Theodore Dru Alison Cockerell in 1910.

== Description ==
Female body length is about 5 mm. Integumental colouration is black head and thorax, green mesothorax, with the abdomen chestnut-red to dark red.

== Distribution and habitat ==
The species occurs in tropical north-eastern Australia. The type locality is Mackay, Queensland. It has also been recorded from Forty Mile Scrub, near Mount Garnet, Queensland.

== Behaviour ==
The adults are flying mellivores. Flowering plants visited by the bees include Eucalyptus species.
