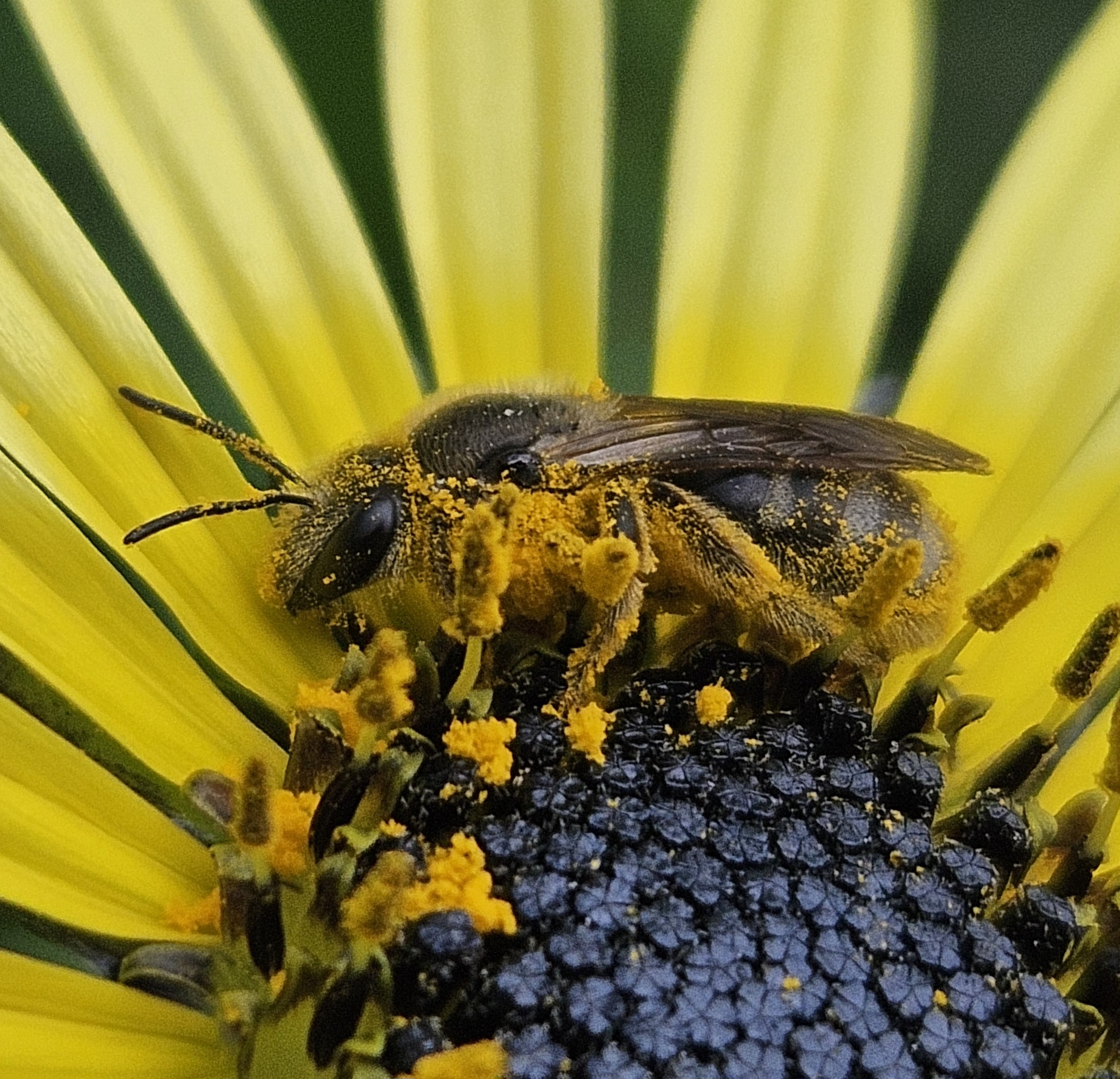
- Chilalictus bee on capeweed flower

Scientific classification
- Kingdom: Animalia
- Phylum: Arthropoda
- Clade: Pancrustacea
- Class: Insecta
- Order: Hymenoptera
- Family: Halictidae
- Genus: Lasioglossum
- Subgenus: Chilalictus; Michener, 1965

= Chilalictus =

Subgenus of Lasioglossum

Chilalictus is a subgenus of the bee genus Lasioglossum, which is in the family Halictidae. It comprises 139 species, which are found throughout Australia. They are tiny to medium-sized bees (3-12mm long). The species vary widely in appearance, with some having bright metallic markings on the dorsal surfaces of the body, while others (generally the larger species) are non-metallic and dark coloured. The abdominal terga usually have basal hair bands. They visit a wide variety of plants.
