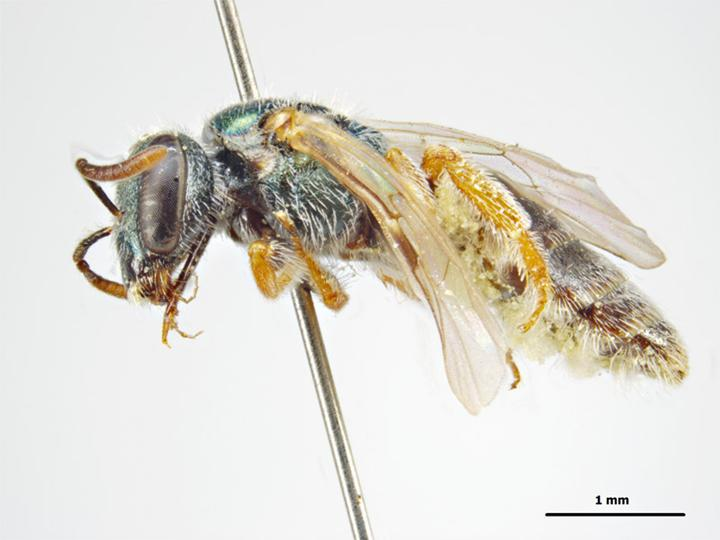
- Female

Scientific classification
- Kingdom: Animalia
- Phylum: Arthropoda
- Clade: Pancrustacea
- Class: Insecta
- Order: Hymenoptera
- Family: Halictidae
- Genus: Lasioglossum
- Species: L. urbanum

Binomial name
- Lasioglossum urbanum Smith, 1879

Synonyms
- Halictus urbanus Smith, 1879; Halictus urbanus baudinensis Cockerell, 1905; Halictus cretinicola Friese, 1909; Halictus kesteveni Cockerell, 1912; Halictus hackeriellus Cockerell, 1914; Halictus pavonellus Cockerell, 1915; Halictus olivinus Cockerell, 1922; Halictus urbanus lomatiae Cockerell, 1922; Halictus microchalceus Cockerell, 1929; Halictus subcarus Cockerell, 1930; Halictus williamsi Cockerell, 1930; Halictus suburbanus Cockerell, 1930; Halictus aponi Cheesman, 1939; Halictus aponi erromangana Cheesman, 1939

= Lasioglossum urbanum =

Species of bee

Lasioglossum urbanum, or Lasioglossum (Homalictus) urbanum, is a species of bee in the family Halictidae and subfamily Halictinae. It is native to Australasia . It was described by English entomologist Frederick Smith in 1879.

== Distribution and habitat ==
The species occurs in all states and territories of mainland Australia, as well as in New Guinea, New Caledonia and Vanuatu.

== Behaviour ==
The adults are flying mellivores. They nest gregariously and communally in soil, and have sedentary larvae. Flowering plants visited by the bees include Acacia, Alphitonia, Amyema, Angophora, Arctotheca, Atalaya, Boronia, Brachychiton, Bursaria, Calandrinia, Callistemon, Calothamnus, Cassia, Daviesia, Eucalyptus, Frankenia, Goodenia, Hakea, Syncarpha, Alectryon, Hibbertia, Hypochaeris, Jacksonia, Leptospermum, Lomatia, Melaleuca, Torenia, Persoonia, Pimelea, Pittosporum, Scaevola, Swainsona, Terminalia, Trachymene, Veronica and Wahlenbergia species.
