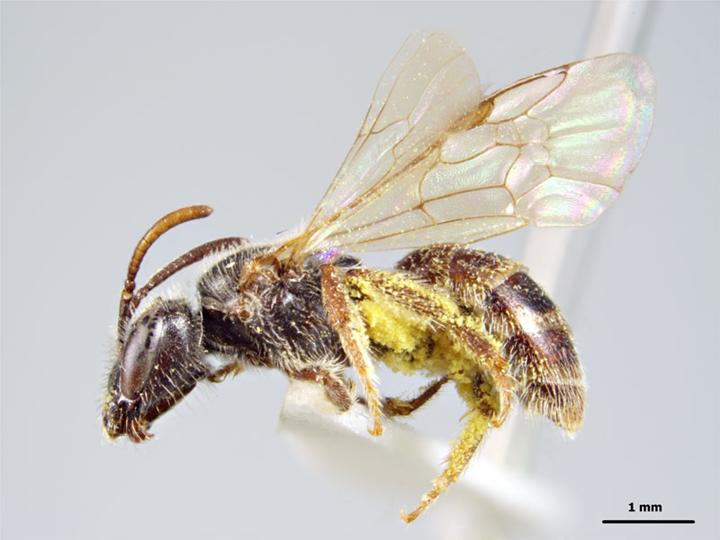
- Female, New Zealand, Canterbury Co. S.I., Porters Pass
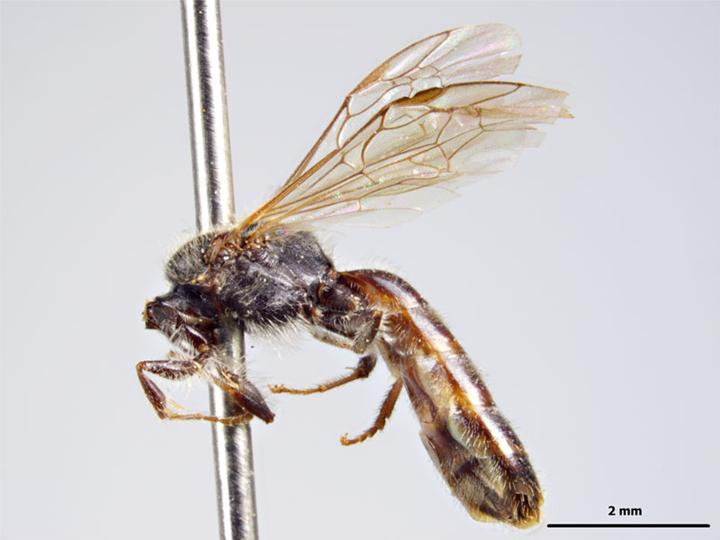
- Lasioglossum mataroa unheaded male

Scientific classification
- Kingdom: Animalia
- Phylum: Arthropoda
- Class: Insecta
- Order: Hymenoptera
- Family: Halictidae
- Tribe: Halictini
- Genus: Lasioglossum
- Species: L. mataroa

Binomial name
- Lasioglossum mataroa Donovan, 2007

= Lasioglossum mataroa =

Species of bee

Lasioglossum mataroa is a bee species that is found in New Zealand.

L. mataroa is part of the genus Lasioglossum and the subfamily Halictinae. L. mataroa is similar to other native bees in New Zealand, most of which are also solitary and ground nesting.

L. mataroa was first described by Barry Donovan in 2007

== Identification ==
The image of L. mataroa from Sarah McCaffrey shows the bee to scale and supports findings by Donovan that the average length of a female ranges from 4.5-6.1 mm and a male 3.9-4.9mm with widths reaching no more than 2mm. Understandably due to the size the L.mataroa is also known as ‘small native bee’ and ngaro huruhuru in Maori as the species is native to New Zealand.

The colour of L. mataroa is primarily blackish brown with yellow antennae central and ahead of the pedicel on both sexes. The face exhibits hues of metallic reds and blues. Legs beyond the main sector of the body are yellow, but those attached to the front are half yellow and half black.

Due to L. mataroa having a general resemblance to some flies they are not easily recognizable. Also help separate this species from the fly the length of the forewing can be identified and ranges from 3.1– 3.9 mm on females and 2.5–3.2 mm on males. The wing veins for both are of a beige colour or pale yellow to the naked eye and L. mataroa has red tarsal claws. By sight the Halictinae can be mistaken for the Colletinae, Andreninae, and Melittidae however it can be distinguished from these families “by the strongly curved (rather than gently curved or straight) 1st abscissa (1/M) of vein M (basal vein) of the fore wing and in females by having metasomal tergum 6 hidden beneath tergum 5”.

L. mataroa can be likened to the L. sordidum in many ways but they can be individually identified, either through the female of the L. mataroa being of a slightly smaller size, most commonly metallic colouration for both male and females on some of the body and as mentioned previously with the origin of the name they have a slightly longer face.

== Distribution ==
Lasioglossum mataroa (New Zealand)

=== Natural global range ===
L. mataroa is native and endemic to New Zealand and does not appear to have been recorded anywhere else. See map image for approximate most common location for specimens collected.

=== New Zealand range ===
Only found in South Island especially eastern and south-central regions possibly preferring temperate environments.

=== Habitat preferences ===
L. mataroa species prefers montane environments. They are a ground nesting species preferring nests sites with a silty matrix and a higher moisture content below the surface with a sloping orientation. It is also important to recognize that the soils which naturally have this consistency in New Zealand have a saline content (are slightly salty) and this may therefore have a significant impact of the L. mataroa's geographical range. The L. mataroa also prefers tumulus surrounding the entrance to the nest consisting of soil and can be clarified by Donovan who reports that the “Nest tunnel is about 1–2 mm across, clear, in substrate fine sandstone, soil, or silt; cells are not lined with cellophane like material”.

== Life cycle/phenology ==
L. mataroa has not widely been researched and therefore, it should be considered that information regarding the lifecycle of this species is assumed to be most similar to Lasioglossum sordidum as confirmed by Donovan, “An outline of the life cycle is known for only one species, L.sordidum, but that of other species is almost certainly similar”. Depending on climatic conditions particularly in relation to soil temperature early summer November – December is generally the period when new adults emerge from the nest. If soil is warming much earlier than this then emergence could even begin in late winter. Ground nests are close together and therefore there could be many thousands emerging at the same time. The percentage of male and female individuals hatching may have been altered in the nest as the female bee is partly able to influence the ratio of sexes. The ability to influence sex ratio for Hymenoptera is due to the haplo-diploid system whereby the unfertilized eggs produce males and fertilized eggs produce females, this leaves the ability for speculation whether the female L. mataroa considers the needs for the success of its own species in its local population when mating. Once out of the nest active flight season begins immediately and the female bees start to construct their own nests.

With preference to nesting alongside each other, mature L. mataroa may re-use a previous nest, one which they have spent the winter in or build a new one. Males do not play an active role in the nesting cycle and therefore, the males only role is to feed himself, seek a female mate, and rest, “males which appear by late spring are all gone [die] by autumn” (B. Donovan, personal communication, March 26, 2019). Females undertake all nest construction, defence, raising of young and foraging to feed young. Females also bear the responsibility for the collection of pollen and nectar which is primarily transported on the hairs of metathoracic legs and propodeum. Furthermore, a female born in late summer or autumn that has been fertilized will spend the winter underground in the nest possibly living for up to 12 months or more. However, as B. Donovan (personal communication March 26, 2019) explained it may be possible that those bees over wintering in the nest may die and be replaced by the fertilized daughters resulting in the life span being like that of the male.

The L. mataroa nest construction is a blind tunnel excavated in fine-grained moist soil that contains cells in which the larvae are raised. The cells contain individual chambers in which the female bee will instil mass-provisions of pollen and nectar that are necessary for the survival of the larvae. The cell is sealed after the egg has been laid on the provisions and the female bee does not re-enter. Although this species generally has only one brood of offspring per year, if the summer has been particularly hot it is possible that a second brood may be nested.

== Diet and foraging ==
Pollen and nectar is consumed by all New Zealand bees, protein is gained through the pollen and sugars are gained through nectar.

The Halictinae have a long resting period throughout winter, so it is necessary to build up resources and reserves to last throughout therefore they must forage on a wide variety of flowering plant species to gain maximum provisions. Host plants of this species include natives and introduced, but L. mataroa has a liking “for 3 native species of Asteraceae, but a very strong preference for 2 introduced species in the family”. The daisy family, Asteraceae, are the largest of flowering plants (Stevens, 2001 as cited in Panero & Crozier, 2004), and L. mataroa prefers the Achillea millefolium (Yarrow) which is highly competitive possibly making it readily available to forage on and “commonly found in pastures throughout New Zealand” but it is also resistant to drought in the summer. The Taraxacum officinale (Dandelion) is the second and is also commonly found in pastures but those that are low in competition as it grows in soil which has fairly low soil fertility. This could possibly explain why the L. mataroa favours this plant as nesting sites are in saline soils and therefore the dandelion species would be growing close by and easily accessible. Furthermore, the root system of these plants reach deep under the surface allowing the plant to survive drought which would be common conditions in the temperate inland environment where the bee can be found.

== Predators, parasites, and diseases ==
No information found for L. mataroa gave specific details for predators, parasites or diseases.

"Enemies of Halictinae are unknown" (Donovan, 1980, p. 107).

== Cultural Value ==
The origin of the name mataroa in Māori breaks down to mata (face) and roa (long). This is due to the females’ face appearing longer than other species in the genus.

== Economic value ==
Native bees play an important role in commercial crops of New Zealand. They are pollinators of some fruits of great commercial value like kiwi fruit. Not being affected by varroa mites makes them easy to control.
