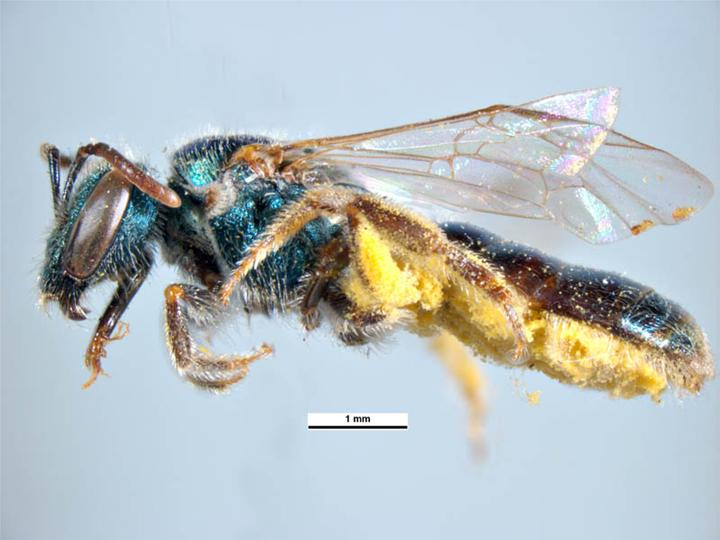
- Female

Scientific classification
- Kingdom: Animalia
- Phylum: Arthropoda
- Clade: Pancrustacea
- Class: Insecta
- Order: Hymenoptera
- Family: Halictidae
- Genus: Lasioglossum
- Species: L. caloundrense

Binomial name
- Lasioglossum caloundrense (Cockerell, 1914)

Synonyms
- Halictus caloundrensis Cockerell, 1914; Halictus flindersi leucurus Cockerell, 1914; Halictus rufoaeneus Friese, 1924; Halictus viridinitens Friese, 1924

= Lasioglossum caloundrense =

Species of bee

Lasioglossum caloundrense, or Lasioglossum (Homalictus) caloundrense, is a species of bee in the family Halictidae and subfamily Halictinae. It is endemic to Australia. It was described by British-American entomologist Theodore Dru Alison Cockerell in 1914.

== Description ==
Female body length is about 6 mm. Integumental colouration is: head bluish-green, mesothorax yellowish-green, abdomen steel-blue. The hair is white.

== Distribution and habitat ==
The species occurs in south-eastern mainland Australia. Type localities include Caloundra and Bribie Island in Queensland, as well as Sydney.

== Behaviour ==
The adults are flying mellivores. Flowering plants visited by the bees include Atalaya, Eucalyptus, Melaleuca and Schinus species.
