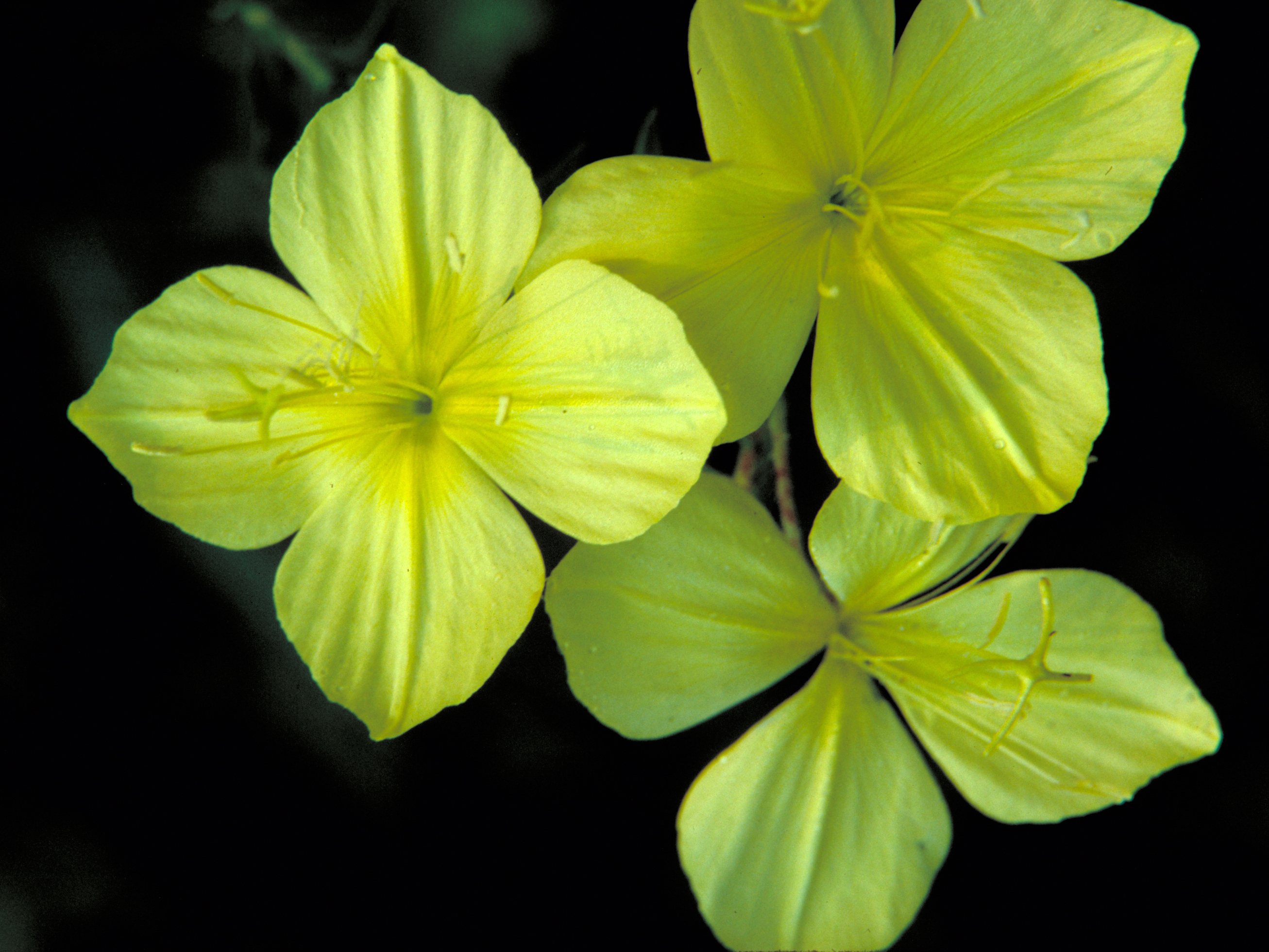
- Close-up of flowers
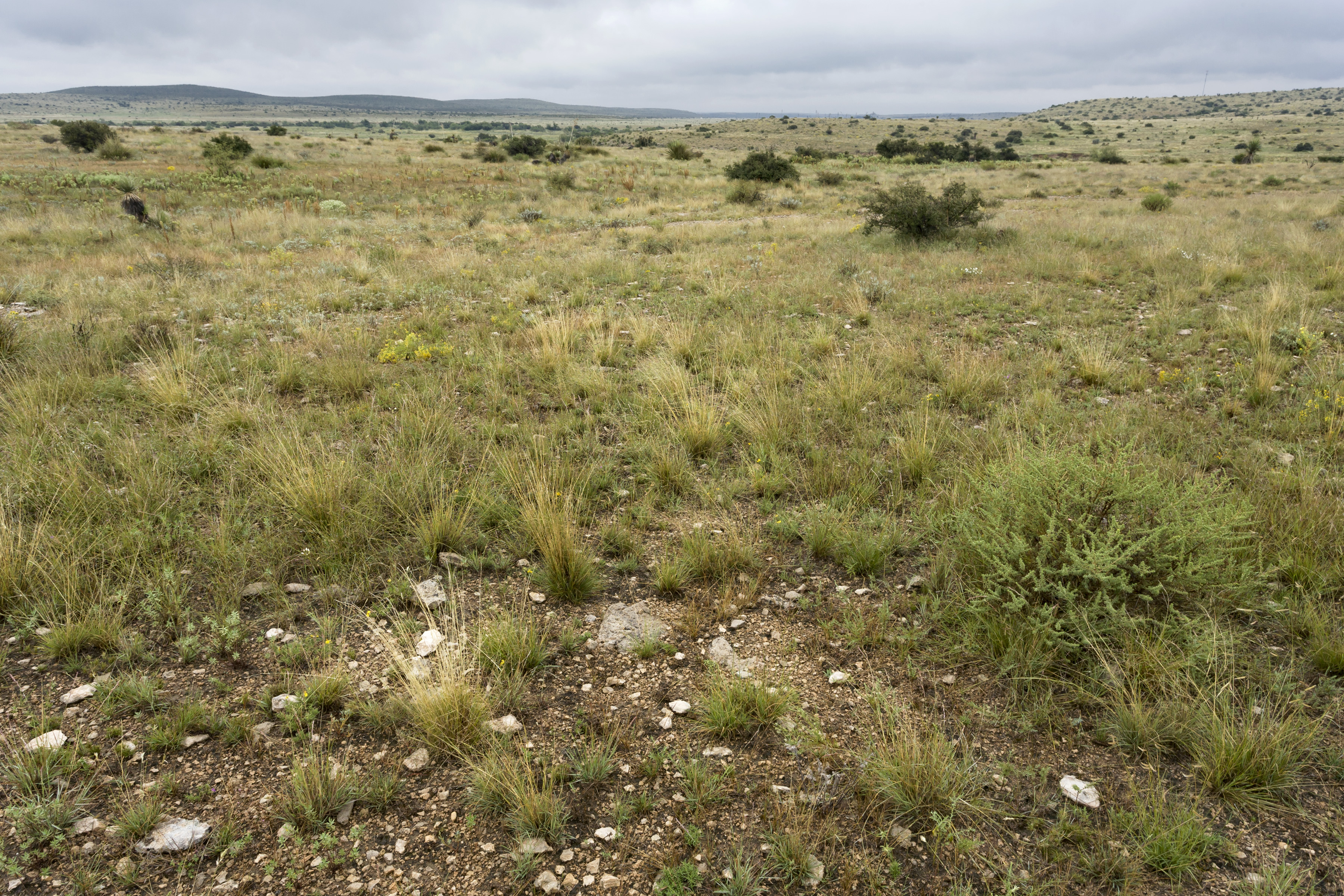
- Habitat

Conservation status
- Apparently Secure (NatureServe)

Scientific classification
- Kingdom: Plantae
- Clade: Tracheophytes
- Clade: Angiosperms
- Clade: Eudicots
- Clade: Rosids
- Order: Myrtales
- Family: Onagraceae
- Genus: Oenothera
- Species: O. rhombipetala

Binomial name
- Oenothera rhombipetala Nutt.

Synonyms
- List: Oenothera heterophylla var. rhombipetala; Raimannia rhombipetala

= Oenothera rhombipetala =

Plant species in the evening primrose family

Oenothera rhombipetala, the four-point evening-primrose, greater four-point evening-primrose, or diamond petal primrose, is a species of flowering plant in the family Onagraceae. It is native to the central United States. A biennial, it is often found alongside roads. It can grow up to 5 feet (1.5 metres) tall.

== Taxonomy ==
Oenothera rhombipetala was scientifically described and named by botanist Thomas Nuttall in 1840. It is classified in the genus Oenothera within the Onagraceae family. It has no varieties, but was described as a variety of Oenothera heterophylla in 1942. It has two heterotypic synonyms.

Table of Synonyms
Name	Year	Rank
Oenothera heterophylla var. rhombipetala (Nutt.) Fosberg	1942	variety
Raimannia rhombipetala (Nutt.) Rose ex Britton & A.Br.	1913	species

== Ecology ==
The dusk and night flying bee Lasioglossum texanum only collects pollen from the four-point evening-primrose.
