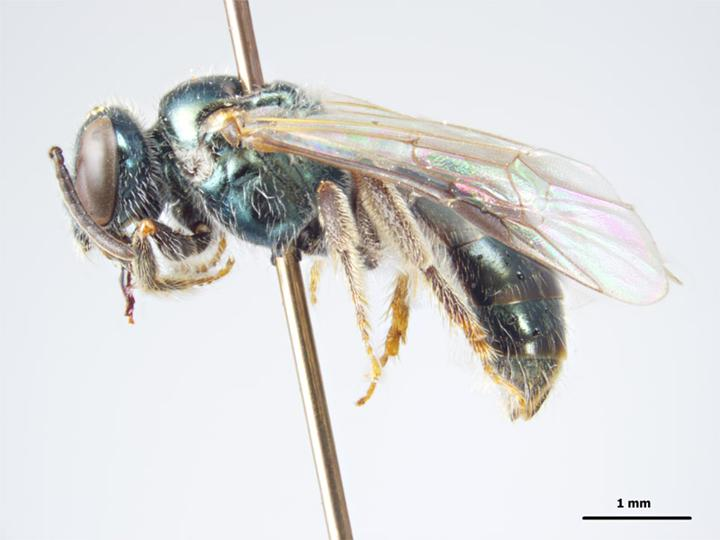
- Female

Scientific classification
- Kingdom: Animalia
- Phylum: Arthropoda
- Clade: Pancrustacea
- Class: Insecta
- Order: Hymenoptera
- Family: Halictidae
- Genus: Lasioglossum
- Species: L. dampieri

Binomial name
- Lasioglossum dampieri (Cockerell, 1905)

Synonyms
- Halictus dampieri Cockerell, 1905; Halictus indigoteus Friese, 1924; Halictus strangulatus Friese, 1924

= Lasioglossum dampieri =

Species of bee

Lasioglossum dampieri, or Lasioglossum (Homalictus) dampieri, is a species of bee in the family Halictidae and subfamily Halictinae. It is endemic to Australia. It was described by British-American entomologist Theodore Dru Alison Cockerell in 1905.

== Description ==
Female body length is about 6 mm. Integumental colouration is mainly dark olive-green.

== Distribution and habitat ==
The species occurs in northern and north-eastern Australia. The type locality is Mackay, Queensland.

== Behaviour ==
The adults are flying mellivores. Flowering plants visited by the bees include Acacia, Alphitonia, Amyema, Angophora, Bursaria, Callistemon, Cassia, Eucalyptus, Eugenia, Jacksonia, Leptospermum, Melaleuca, Terminalia, Tristaniopsis and Xanthorrhoea species.

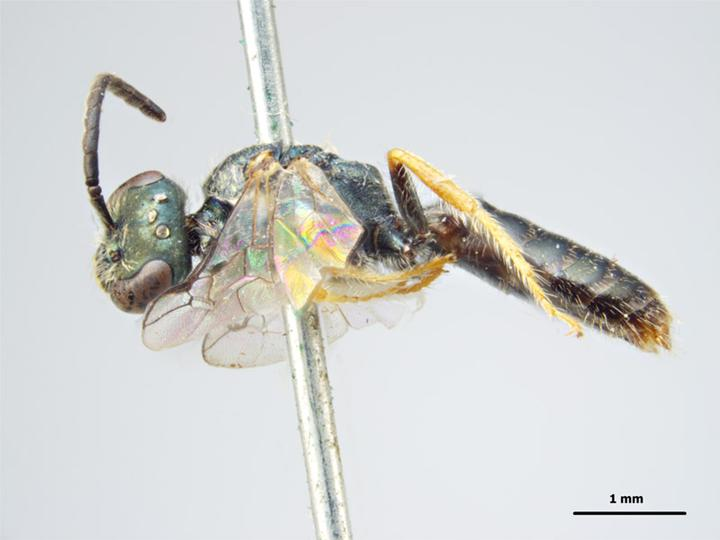
Male
