= Lasioglossum tasmaniae =

Scientific classification
- Kingdom: Animalia
- Phylum: Arthropoda
- Clade: Pancrustacea
- Class: Insecta
- Order: Hymenoptera
- Family: Halictidae
- Genus: Lasioglossum
- Species: L. tasmaniae

Binomial name
- Lasioglossum tasmaniae (Cockerell, 1905)

Synonyms
- Sphecodes tasmaniae Cockerell, 1905

Species of bee

Lasioglossum tasmaniae, or Lasioglossum (Homalictus) tasmaniae, is a species of bee in the family Halictidae and subfamily Halictinae. It is endemic to Australia. It was described by British-American entomologist Theodore Dru Alison Cockerell in 1905.

== Description ==
Male body length is about 5.5 mm. Integumental colouration is mainly black, with reddish markings.

== Distribution and habitat ==
The species occurs in Tasmania. The type locality is Hobart.

== Behaviour ==
The adults are flying mellivores.
