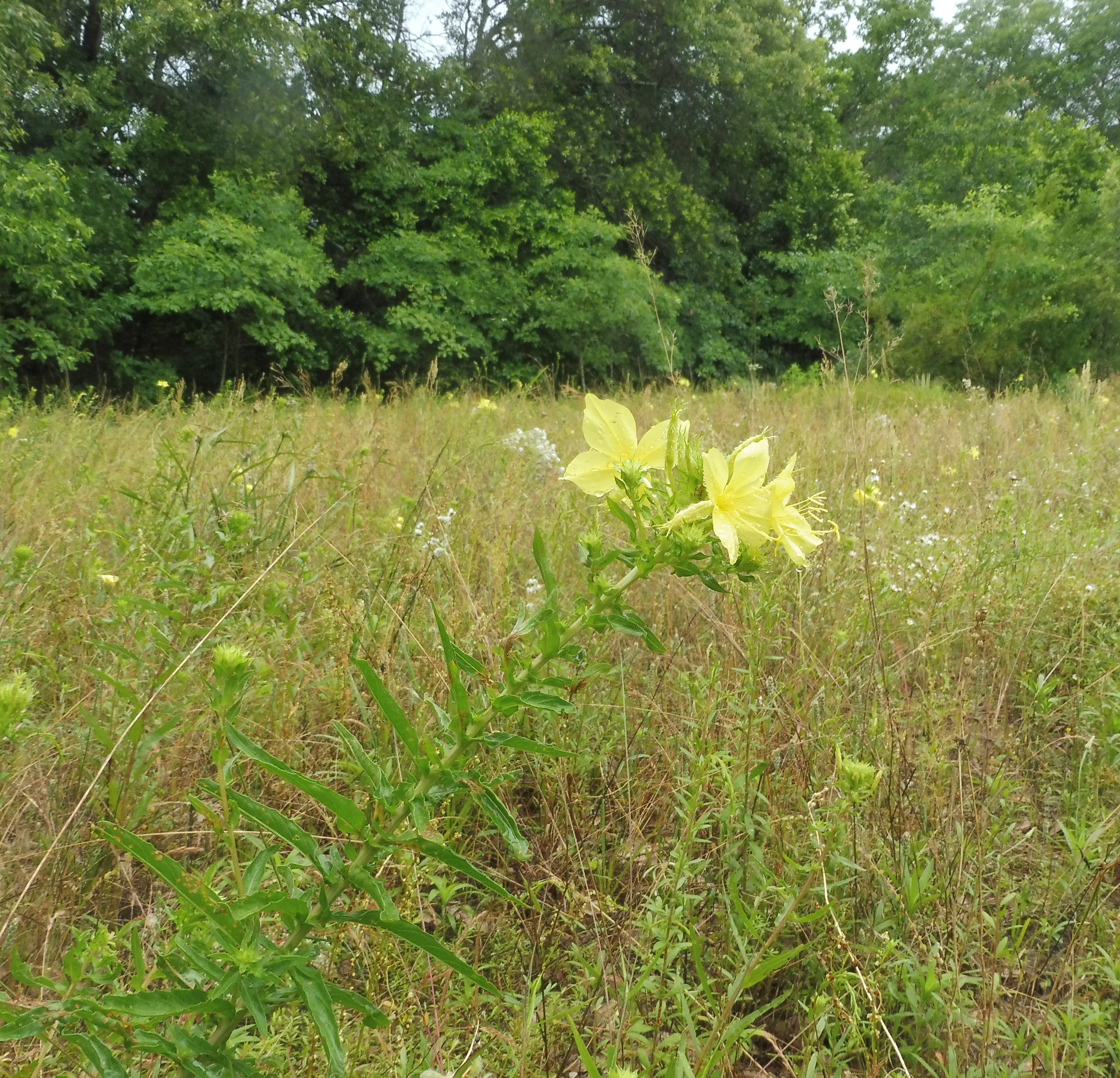

Scientific classification
- Kingdom: Plantae
- Clade: Tracheophytes
- Clade: Angiosperms
- Clade: Eudicots
- Clade: Rosids
- Order: Myrtales
- Family: Onagraceae
- Genus: Oenothera
- Species: O. heterophylla

Binomial name
- Oenothera heterophylla Spach

= Oenothera heterophylla =

Species of flowering plant

Oenothera heterophylla, commonly called the sandhill evening-primrose or the variableleaf evening-primrose, is a species of flowering plant in the evening-primrose family (Onagraceae). It is native to the South Central region of the United States, with a disjunct eastern population in Alabama. It has been recorded as an introduced waif in Missouri.

Its natural habitat is open sandy woodlands. It is particularly common in the sandhill communities of east Texas.

Oenothera heterophylla is an annual or short-lived perennial. It is an herbaceous plant growing to around 0.7 m. It produces yellow flowers that open around sunset from May through September. It can be distinguished from the similar-looking Oenothera rhombipetala by its elongated sepal tips, spreading-pubescent flower buds, and mature lower buds that extend past the tip of the spike.

== Taxonomy ==
Two subspecies of Oenothera heterophylla are currently recognized. They are:

- O. heterophylla ssp. heterophylla - Native to Arkansas, Louisiana, and Texas
- O. heterophylla ssp. orientalis - Native to Alabama and Arkansas
