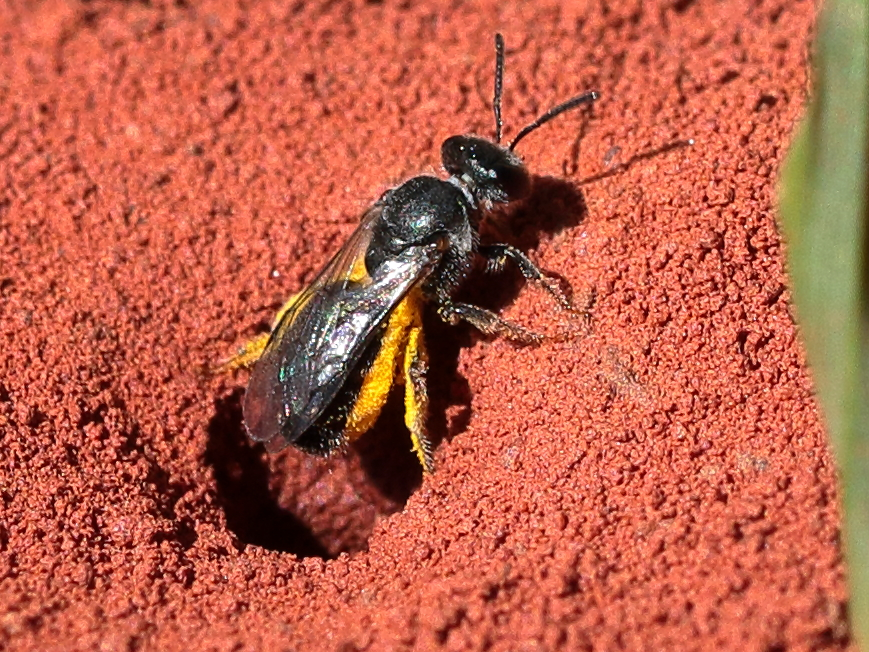

Scientific classification
- Kingdom: Animalia
- Phylum: Arthropoda
- Clade: Pancrustacea
- Class: Insecta
- Order: Hymenoptera
- Family: Halictidae
- Genus: Lasioglossum
- Species: L. blackburni

Binomial name
- Lasioglossum blackburni (Cockerell, 1910)

Synonyms
- Halictus blackburni Cockerell, 1910; Homalictus blackburni (Cockerell, 1910); Halictus crinitus Friese, 1924

= Lasioglossum blackburni =

Species of bee

Lasioglossum blackburni, or Lasioglossum (Homalictus) blackburni, is an Australian species of sweat bee. It was first described by Cockerell in 1910.

== Description ==
Female body length is about 6 mm. Integumental colouration is mainly shiny black.

== Distribution and habitat ==
The species occurs in northern and north-eastern Australia in moist coastal regions of tropical Queensland and the Northern Territory. The type locality is Mackay, Queensland.

== Behaviour ==
The adults are flying mellivores. Flowering plants visited by the bees include Cassia, Eucalyptus, Eugenia, Leptospermum, Melaleuca, Thryptomene, Tristaniopsis and Xanthorrhoea species.

Like most halictid bees they nest underground where they provision their larvae with pollen. Their shiny black colouring contrasts with the colour of pollen collected.

== Gallery ==
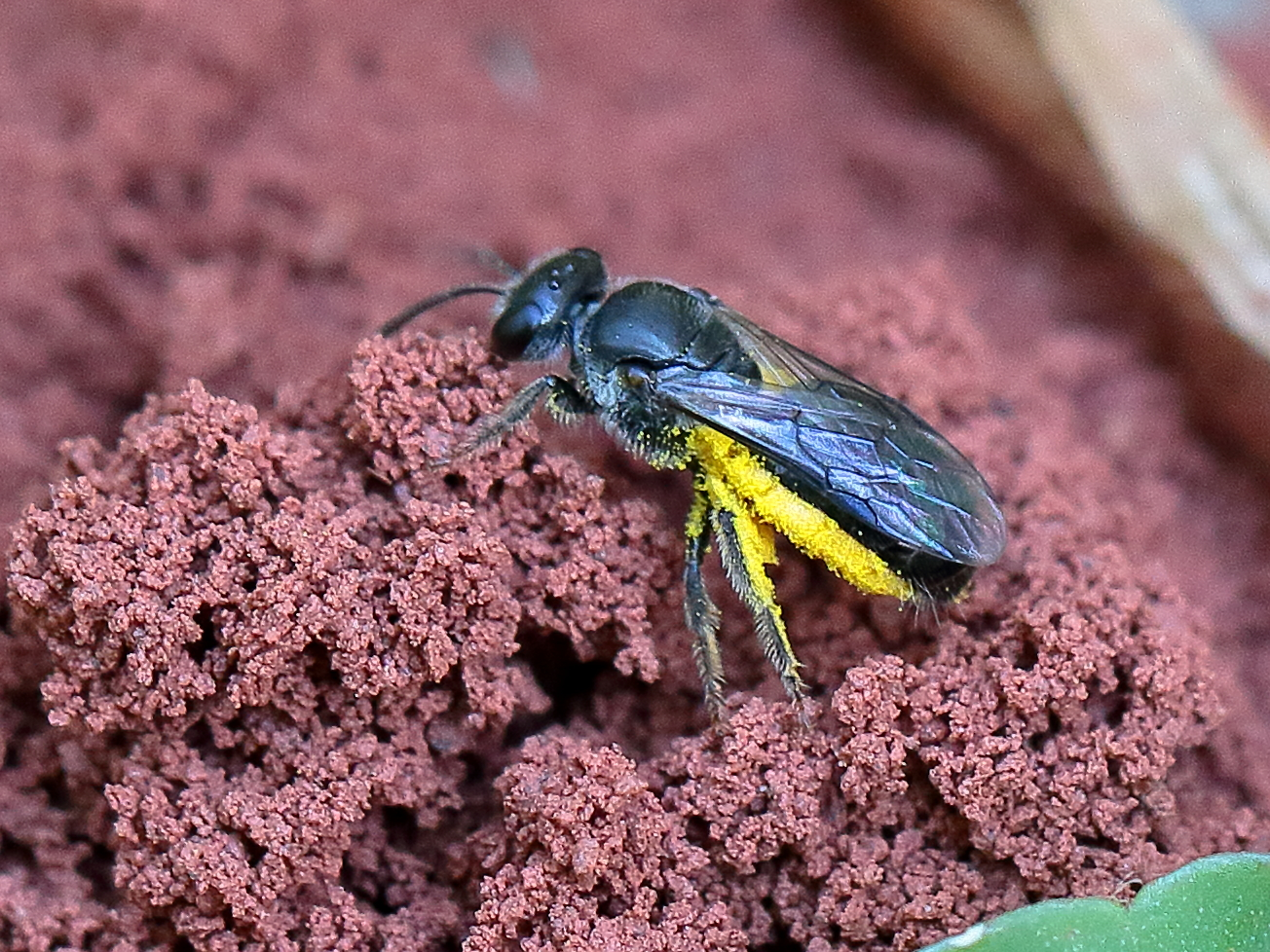
Lasioglossum blackburni with yellow pollen

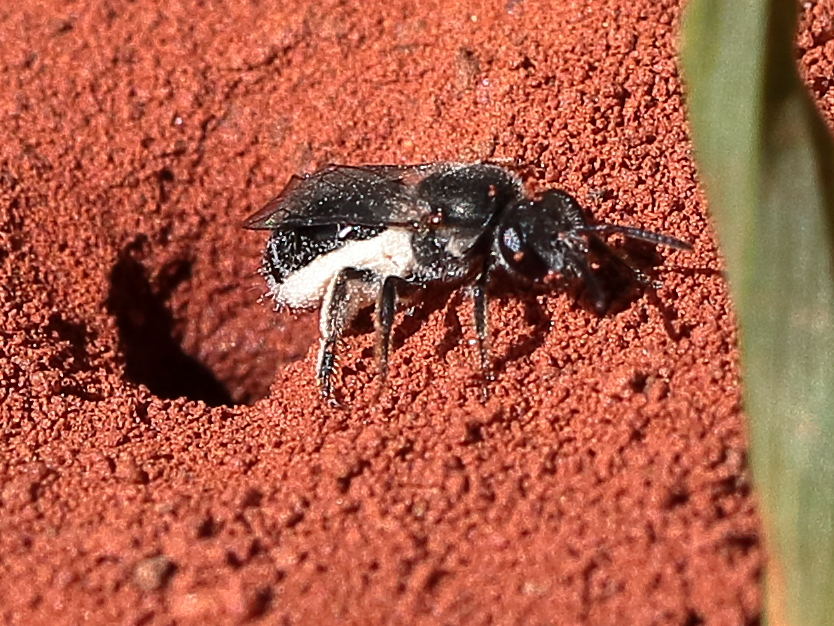
This example carries white pollen

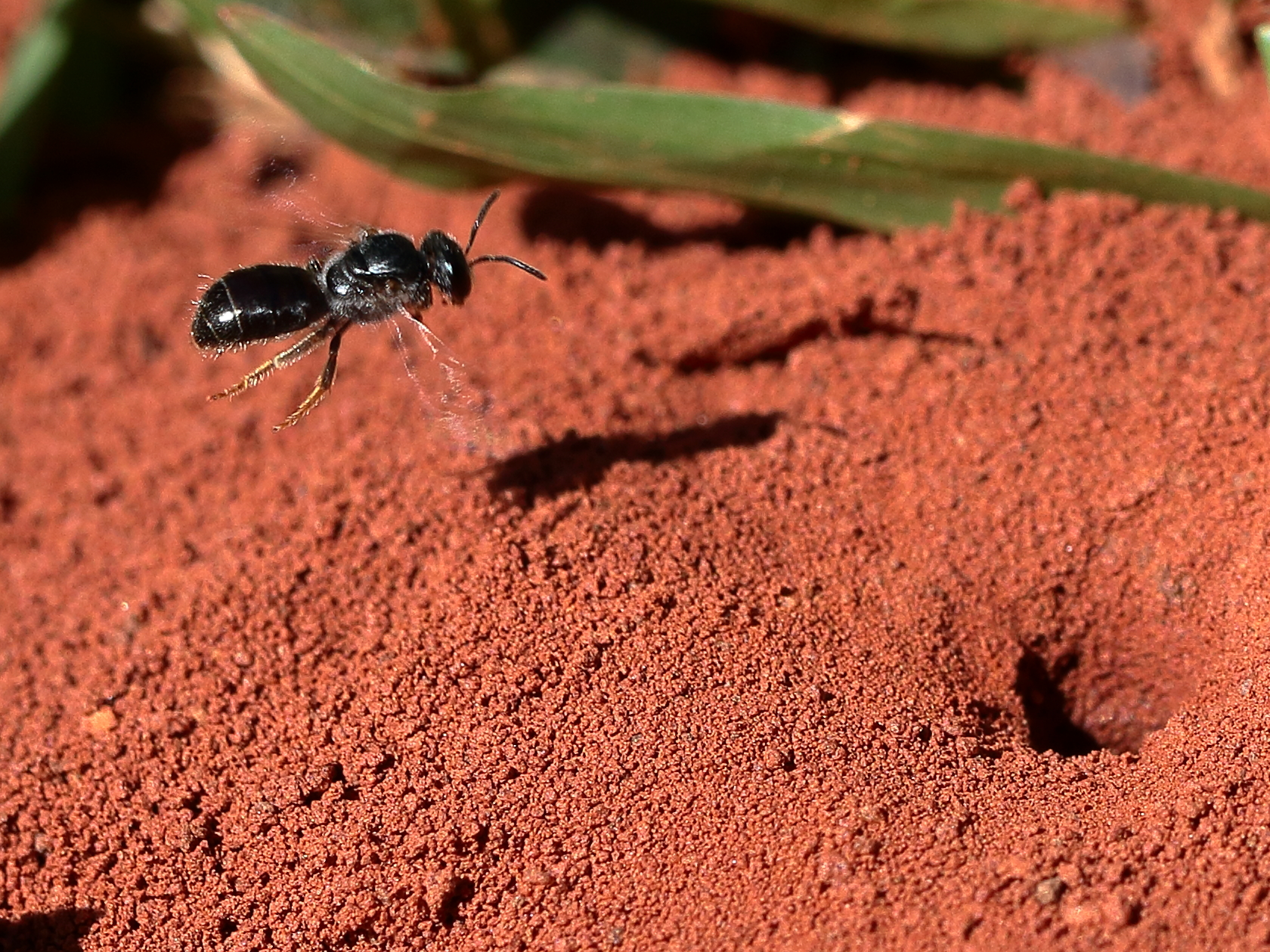
Returning to its nest
