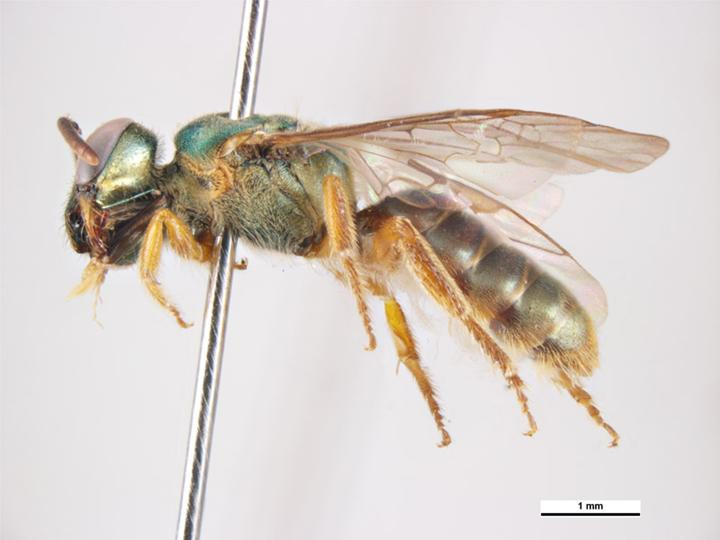
- Female

Scientific classification
- Kingdom: Animalia
- Phylum: Arthropoda
- Clade: Pancrustacea
- Class: Insecta
- Order: Hymenoptera
- Family: Halictidae
- Genus: Lasioglossum
- Species: L. andrewsi

Binomial name
- Lasioglossum andrewsi Kirby, 1900

Synonyms
- Halictus andrewsi Kirby, 1900

= Lasioglossum andrewsi =

Species of bee

Lasioglossum andrewsi, or Lasioglossum (Homalictus) andrewsi, is a species of bee in the family Halictidae and subfamily Halictinae. It is endemic to Christmas Island, an Australian territory in the Indian Ocean. It was described by English entomologist William Forsell Kirby in 1900.

== Distribution and habitat ==
The species occurs only on Christmas Island, in terrestrial and freshwater habitats.

== Behaviour ==
The adults are flying mellivores.

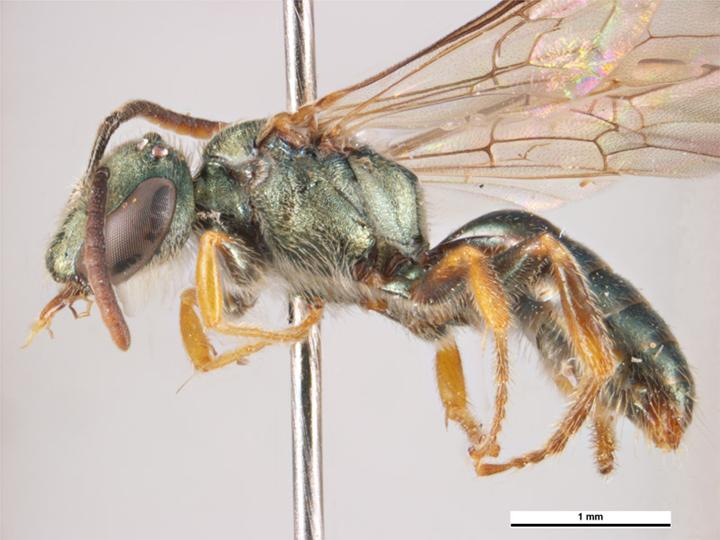
Male
