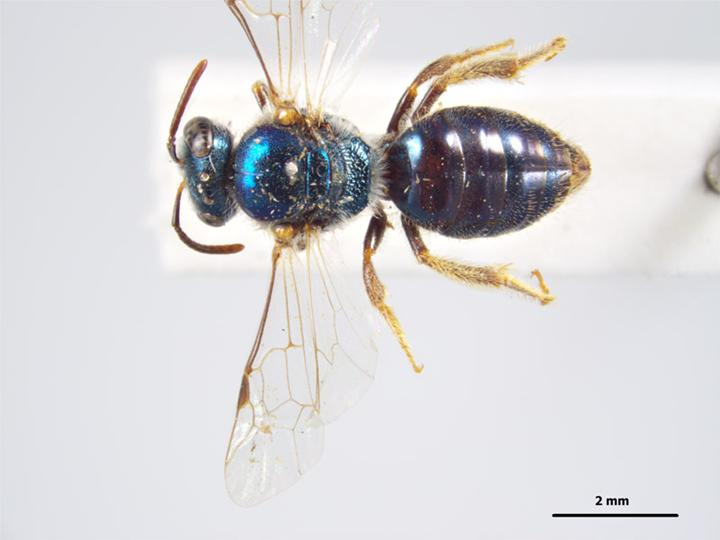
- Female
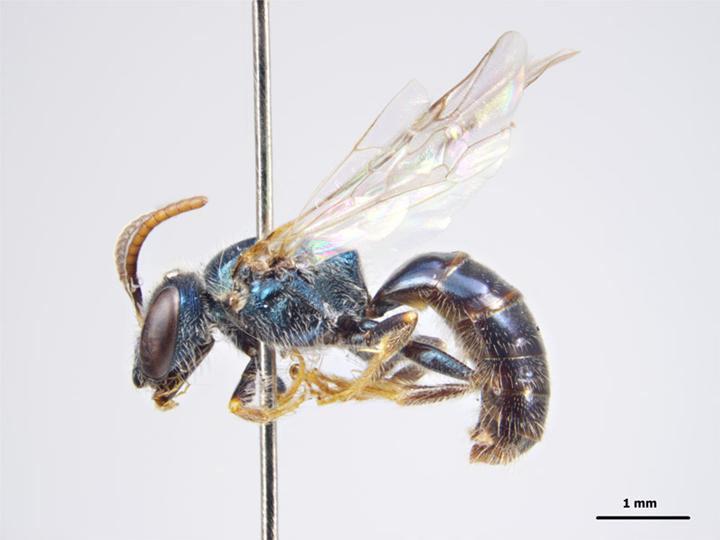
- Male

Scientific classification
- Kingdom: Animalia
- Phylum: Arthropoda
- Clade: Pancrustacea
- Class: Insecta
- Order: Hymenoptera
- Family: Halictidae
- Genus: Lasioglossum
- Species: L. behri

Binomial name
- Lasioglossum behri (Cockerell, 1910)

Synonyms
- Halictus behri Cockerell, 1910

= Lasioglossum behri =

Species of bee

Lasioglossum behri, or Lasioglossum (Homalictus) behri, is a species of bee in the family Halictidae and subfamily Halictinae. It is endemic to Australia. It was described by British-American entomologist Theodore Dru Alison Cockerell in 1910.

== Description ==
Female body length is about 6.5 mm. Integumental colouration is mainly glossy bluish-green, the abdomen dark purplish, the hair yellowish.

== Distribution and habitat ==
The species occurs in tropical northern Australia. The type locality is Port Darwin.

== Behaviour ==
The adults are flying mellivores. Flowering plants visited by the bees include Spermacoce, Pogostemon, Eucalyptus, Parinari, Thryptomene and Tristaniopsis.
