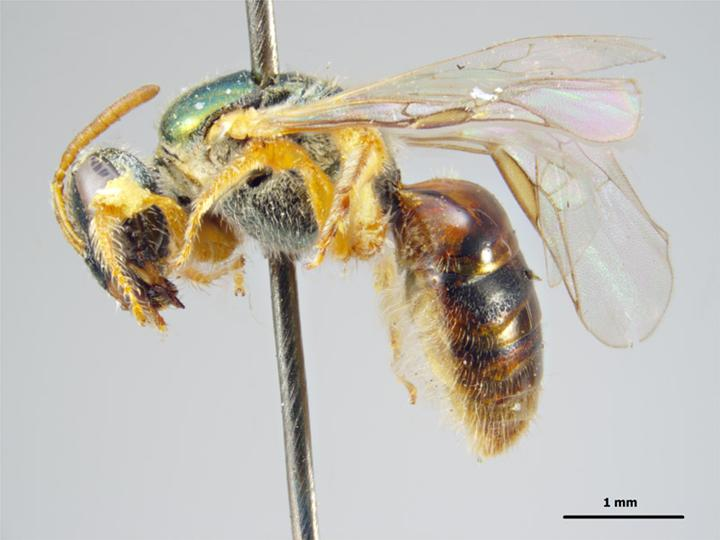
- Female
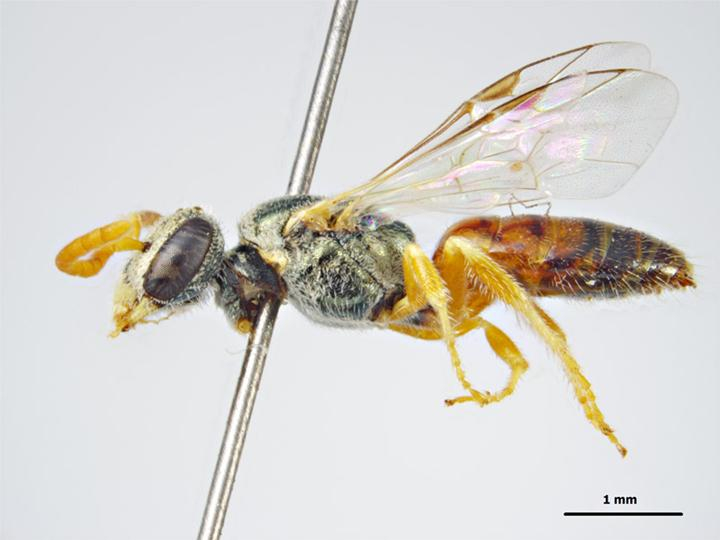
- Male

Scientific classification
- Kingdom: Animalia
- Phylum: Arthropoda
- Clade: Pancrustacea
- Class: Insecta
- Order: Hymenoptera
- Family: Halictidae
- Genus: Lasioglossum
- Species: L. dotatum

Binomial name
- Lasioglossum dotatum (Cockerell, 1912)

Synonyms
- Halictus dotatus Cockerell, 1912; Halictus (Chloralictus) occidentalis Rayment, 1930; Halictus codenticalis Rayment, 1935

= Lasioglossum dotatum =

Species of bee

Lasioglossum dotatum, or Lasioglossum (Homalictus) dotatum, is a species of bee in the family Halictidae and subfamily Halictinae. It is endemic to Australia. It was described by British-American entomologist Theodore Dru Alison Cockerell in 1912.

== Description ==
Female body length is about 5.5 mm. Head and thorax are green, abdomen and legs bright rust-red.

== Distribution and habitat ==
The species occurs across much of mainland Australia. Type localities include Sydney and Perth.

== Behaviour ==
The adults are flying mellivores. They nest communally in soil and have sedentary larvae. Flowering plants visited by the bees include Acacia, Amyema, Angophora, Atalaya, Callistemon, Codonocarpus, Eucalyptus, Grevillea, Hakea, Seringia, Leptospermum, Melaleuca, Ptilotus, Schinus, Terminalia, Tristaniopsis and Wahlenbergia species.
