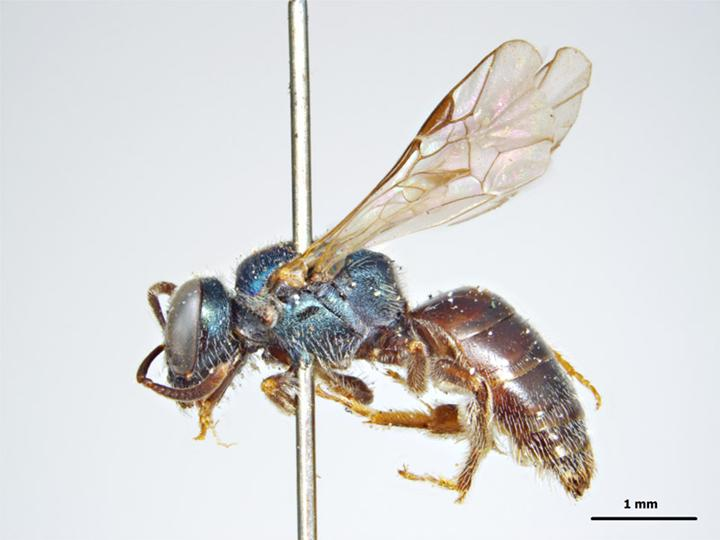
- Female
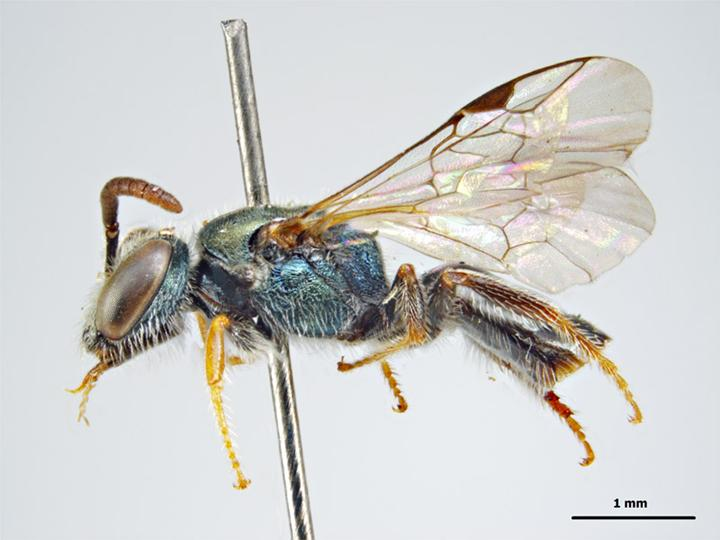
- Male

Scientific classification
- Kingdom: Animalia
- Phylum: Arthropoda
- Clade: Pancrustacea
- Class: Insecta
- Order: Hymenoptera
- Family: Halictidae
- Genus: Lasioglossum
- Species: L. murrayi

Binomial name
- Lasioglossum murrayi (Cockerell, 1905)

Synonyms
- Halictus murrayi Cockerell, 1905

= Lasioglossum murrayi =

Species of bee

Lasioglossum murrayi, or Lasioglossum (Homalictus) murrayi, is a species of bee in the family Halictidae and subfamily Halictinae. It is endemic to Australia. It was described by British-American entomologist Theodore Dru Alison Cockerell in 1905.

== Description ==
Female body length is about 5 mm. Integumental colouration is mainly glossy dark blue and black, with greenish tints.

== Distribution and habitat ==
The species occurs in northern and southern Australia. The type locality is Adelaide River in the Northern Territory.

== Behaviour ==
The adults are flying mellivores. Flowering plants visited by the bees include Anigozanthos, Atalaya, Borreria, Bursaria, Eremophila, Eucalyptus, Terminalia, Tristaniopsis and Xanthorrhoea species.
