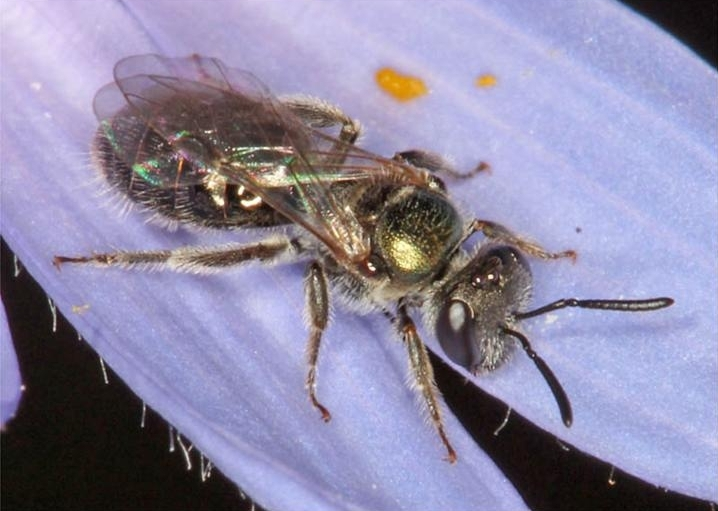
- Female

Scientific classification
- Kingdom: Animalia
- Phylum: Arthropoda
- Clade: Pancrustacea
- Class: Insecta
- Order: Hymenoptera
- Family: Halictidae
- Genus: Lasioglossum
- Species: L. exlautum

Binomial name
- Lasioglossum exlautum (Cockerell, 1905)

Synonyms
- Halictus punctatus Smith, 1879; Halictus punctatus exlautus Cockerell, 1905; Halictus hedleyi Cockerell, 1910; Halictus pallidifrons Rayment, 1935; Halictus subpallidifrons Rayment, 1935; Halictus phillipensis Rayment, 1935

= Lasioglossum exlautum =

Species of bee

Lasioglossum exlautum, or Lasioglossum (Homalictus) exlautum, is a species of bee in the family Halictidae and subfamily Halictinae. It is endemic to Australia. It was described by British-American entomologist Theodore Dru Alison Cockerell in 1905. The name Lasioglossum punctatum was used for this species until it was recognised as being in use for a different species from Indonesia, at which point the next oldest name, exlautum, was used as a replacement.

== Description ==
Female body length is about 6 mm. Integumental colouration is mainly black and green, with the abdomen apricot-coloured.

== Distribution and habitat ==
The species occurs in both western and eastern Australia. Type localities include Geraldton and Port Phillip.

== Behaviour ==
The adults are flying mellivores. The males cluster at night. Flowering plants visited by the bees include Acacia, Angophora, Arctotheca, Boronia, Bursaria, Coreopsis, Eucalyptus, Hypochaeris, Leucopogon, Mesembryanthemum, Myoporum, Olearia, Syzygium and Veronica species.
