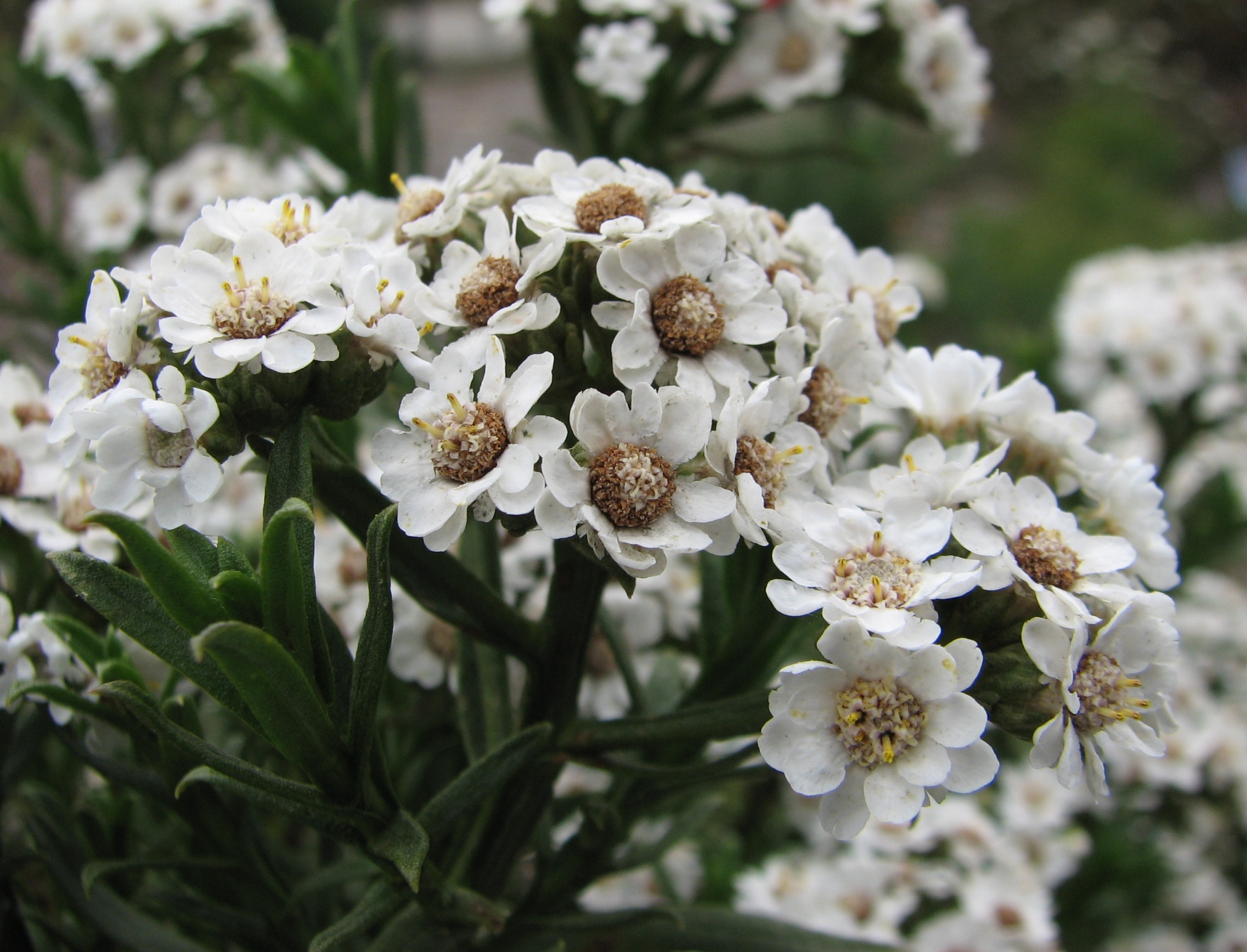
- Ixodia achillaeoides subsp. alata

Scientific classification
- Kingdom: Plantae
- Clade: Tracheophytes
- Clade: Angiosperms
- Clade: Eudicots
- Clade: Asterids
- Order: Asterales
- Family: Asteraceae
- Subfamily: Asteroideae
- Tribe: Gnaphalieae
- Genus: Ixodia; R.Br.

Species
- See text

= Ixodia (plant) =

Genus of plants

Ixodia is a small genus of flowering plants in the family Asteraceae. It is endemic to Australia, ranging from South Australia to western Victoria.

== Species list ==
The following species and subspecies are accepted by the Australian Plant Census as at January 2021:

- Ixodia achillaeoides R.Br. (S.A., Vic.)
  - Ixodia achillaeoides R.Br. subsp. achillaeoides (S.A.)
  - Ixodia achillaeoides subsp. arenicola (Schltdl.) Copley (S.A., Vic.)
- Ixodia flindersica Copley (S.A.)
