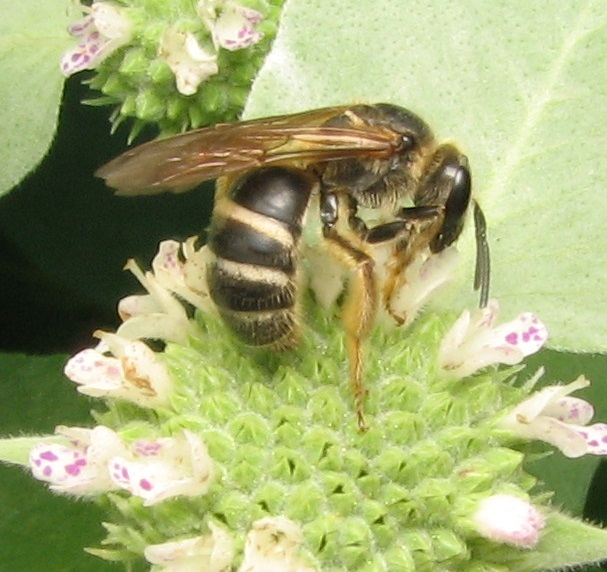

Scientific classification
- Kingdom: Animalia
- Phylum: Arthropoda
- Clade: Pancrustacea
- Class: Insecta
- Order: Hymenoptera
- Family: Halictidae
- Subfamily: Halictinae
- Tribe: Halictini
- Genus: Lasioglossum; Curtis, 1833

Subgenera
- See text

= Lasioglossum =

Genus of insects

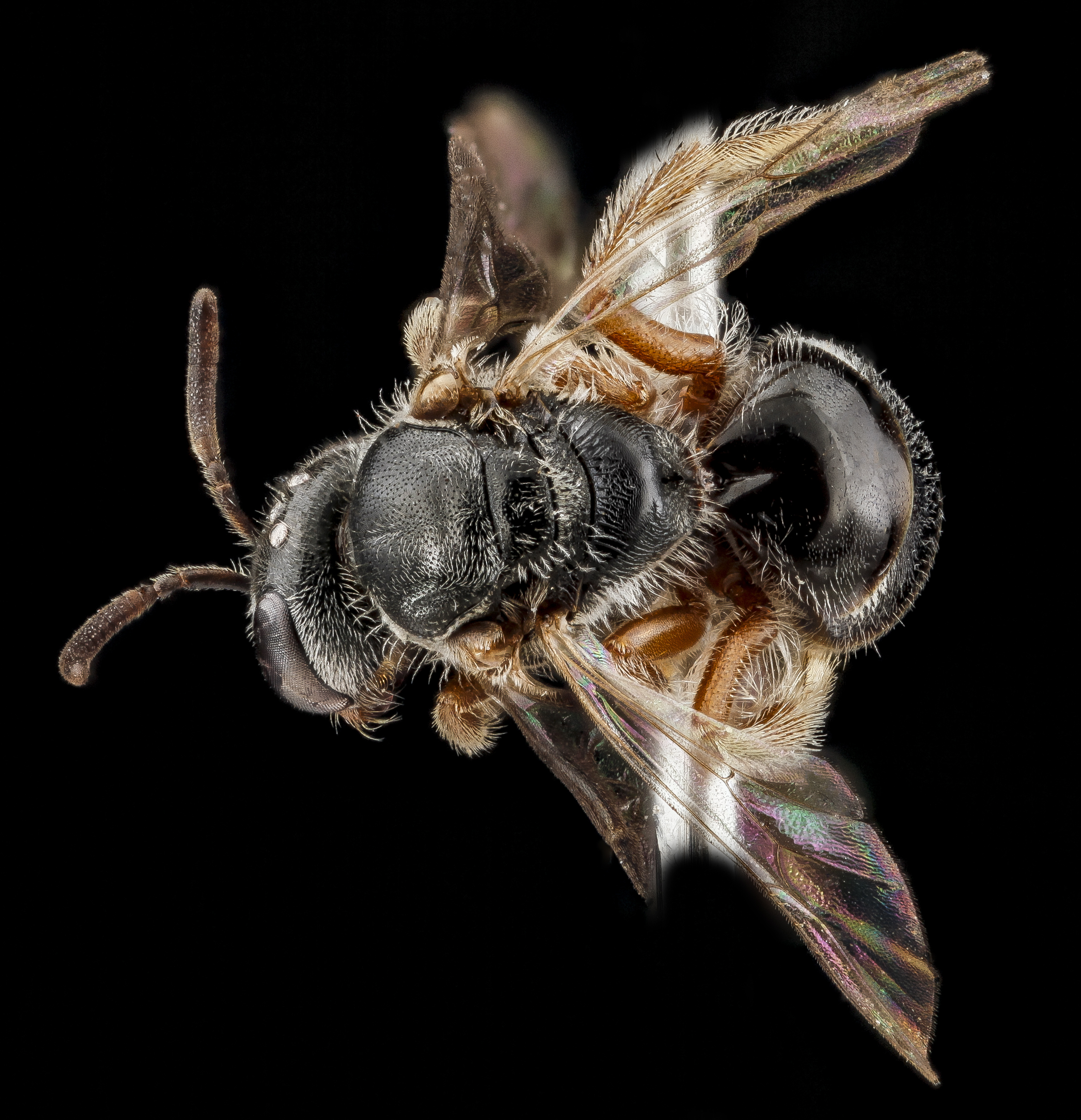
female Lasioglossum birkmani

The sweat bee genus Lasioglossum is the largest of all bee genera, containing over 1800 species in numerous subgenera worldwide. They are highly variable in size, colouring and sculpture. Of the variants, some are kleptoparasites, some are nocturnal, and some are oligolectic. Most Lasioglossum species nest in the ground, but some nest in rotten logs.

== Behaviour ==
Social behaviour among species of Lasioglossum is variable; species are known to exhibit solitary nesting, primitive eusociality, and social parasitism. Colony sizes vary widely, from small colonies of a single queen and four or fewer workers, to large colonies of >400 workers and perennial life cycles.

The genus Lasioglossum can be divided into two informal series based on the strength of the distal veins of the forewing. The nominate series Lasioglossum (or strong-veined Lasioglossum) is mostly composed of solitary or communal species, even if some species such as Lasioglossum aegyptiellum show signs of division of labour indicative of eusociality.

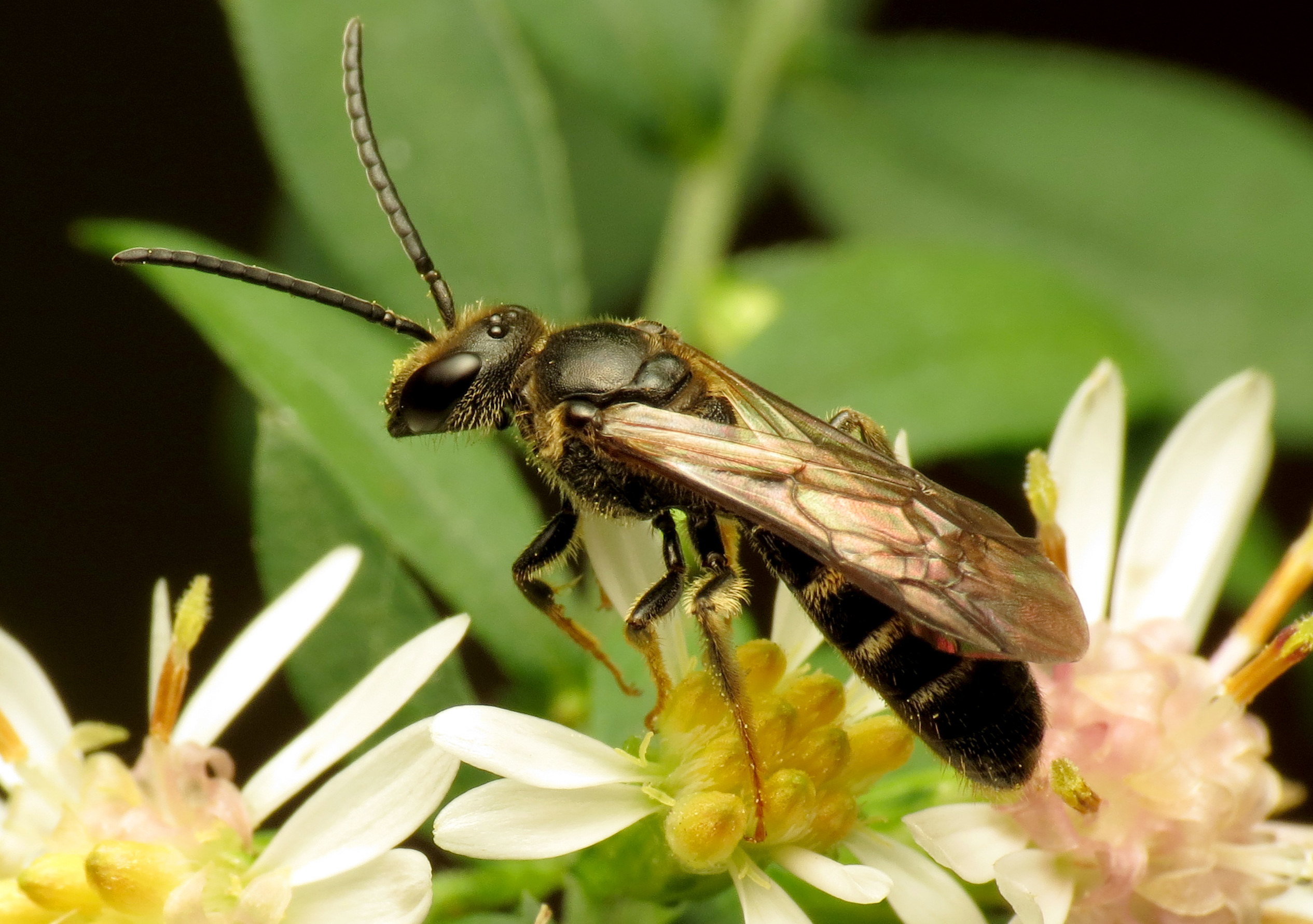
Lasioglossum sp. male

The series Hemihalictus (or weak-veined Lasioglossum) includes species with a wide range of sociality. The Hemihalictus series is composed of species which are solitary, communal, primitively eusocial, kleptoparasitic, or socially parasitic. Eusocial species may have small colonies with only one or a few workers or large colonies with dozens of workers. Large colony sizes occur in Lasioglossum marginatum, which forms perennial colonies lasting five or six years, with hundreds of workers; this species is the only halictine bee with perennial colonies.

== Subgenera ==
A list of subgenera (modified from Michener's Bees of the World):

- Series Lasioglossum: Australictus, Callalictus, Chilalictus, Ctenonomia, Echthralictus, Glossalictus, Homalictus, Ipomalictus, Lasioglossum s. str., Leuchalictus, Oxyhalictus, Parasphecodes, Pseudochilalictus, Rubrihalictus, Urohalictus.
- Series Hemihalictus: Acanthalictus, Austrevylaeus, Biennilaeus, Capalictus, Dialictus, Eickwortia, Evylaeus, Hemihalictus, Rostrohalictus_{,} Pyghalictus, Sphecodogastra.

Subgeneric classification of Lasioglossum remains controversial, with disagreement among experts on the number and extent of subgenera.

== Species ==
Two of the better-known species are the European Lasioglossum malachurum and the North American Lasioglossum zephyrus. For the full list, see:

- List of Lasioglossum species
