= List of Triepeolus species =

This is a list of species in the kleptoparasitic bee genus Triepeolus.

== Species ==
- Triepeolus aguilari Moure, 1955
- Triepeolus alvarengai Moure, 1955
- Triepeolus ancoratus Cockerell, 1916
- Triepeolus antiguensis Cockerell, 1949
- Triepeolus antiochensis Rightmyer, 2008
- Triepeolus argentimus Rightmyer, 2008
- Triepeolus argus Rightmyer, 2008
- Triepeolus argyreus (Cockerell, 1907)
- Triepeolus atoconganus Moure, 1955
- Triepeolus atripes Mitchell, 1962
- Triepeolus aztecus (Cresson, 1878)
- Triepeolus balteatus Cockerell, 1921
- Triepeolus bihamatus (Cockerell, 1907)
- Triepeolus bilineatus Cockerell, 1949
- Triepeolus bilunatus Cockerell, 1949
- Triepeolus bimorulus Rightmyer, 2008
- Triepeolus blaisdelli Cockerell & Sandhouse, 1924
- Triepeolus brittaini Cockerell, 1931
- Triepeolus brunnescens Cockerell & Sandhouse, 1924
- Triepeolus buchwaldi (Friese, 1908)
- Triepeolus californicus (Cresson, 1878)
- Triepeolus callopus Cockerell, 1905
- Triepeolus cameroni (Meade-Waldo, 1913)
- Triepeolus charlesi Rightmyer, 2008
- Triepeolus circumculus Rightmyer, 2008
- Triepeolus claytoni Rightmyer, 2008
- Triepeolus concavus (Cresson, 1878)
- Triepeolus cressonii (Robertson, 1897)
- Triepeolus cruciformis Rightmyer, 2008
- Triepeolus cuabitensis Genaro, 1999
- Triepeolus cuneatus Cockerell, 1917
- Triepeolus custeri Cockerell, 1926
- Triepeolus cyclurus Cockerell, 1923
- Triepeolus dacotensis (Stevens, 1919)
- Triepeolus denverensis Cockerell, 1910
- Triepeolus diffusus Rightmyer, 2008
- Triepeolus dilutus Rightmyer, 2008
- Triepeolus distinctus (Cresson, 1878)
- Triepeolus diversipes Cockerell, 1924
- Triepeolus donatus (Smith, 1854)
- Triepeolus edwardi Rightmyer, 2008
- Triepeolus eldoradensis (Cockerell, 1910)
- Triepeolus eliseae
- Triepeolus engeli Rightmyer, 2008
- Triepeolus epeolurus Rightmyer, 2004
- Triepeolus exilicurvus Rightmyer, 2008
- Triepeolus flavigradus Rightmyer, 2008
- Triepeolus flavipennis (Friese, 1917)
- Triepeolus fraserae Cockerell, 1904
- Triepeolus fulgidus Rightmyer, 2008
- Triepeolus georgicus Mitchell, 1962
- Triepeolus grandis (Friese, 1917)
- Triepeolus grindeliae Cockerell, 1907
- Triepeolus griswoldi Rightmyer, 2008
- Triepeolus haematurus Cockerell & Sandhouse, 1924
- Triepeolus helianthi (Robertson, 1897)
- Triepeolus hopkinsi Cockerell, 1905
- Triepeolus interruptus Rightmyer, 2008
- Triepeolus intrepidus (Smith, 1879)
- Triepeolus inyoensis Cockerell & Sandhouse, 1924
- Triepeolus isocomae Cockerell, 1904
- Triepeolus isohedrus Rightmyer, 2008
- Triepeolus jennieae Rightmyer, 2008
- Triepeolus joliae Rightmyer, 2008
- Triepeolus junctus Mitchell, 1962
- Triepeolus kathrynae Rozen, 1989
- Triepeolus lateralis Rightmyer, 2008
- Triepeolus laticaudus Cockerell, 1921
- Triepeolus laticeps (Friese, 1917)
- Triepeolus lectiformis (Cockerell, 1925)
- Triepeolus loomisorum Rozen, 1989
- Triepeolus lunatus (Say, 1824)
- Triepeolus lusor Cockerell, 1925
- Triepeolus margaretae Rightmyer, 2008
- Triepeolus martini (Cockerell, 1900)
- Triepeolus mauropygus Rightmyer, 2008
- Triepeolus medusa Cockerell, 1917
- Triepeolus melanarius Rightmyer, 2008
- Triepeolus mensae Cockerell, 1924
- Triepeolus metatarsalis (Friese, 1921)
- Triepeolus mexicanus (Cresson, 1878)
- Triepeolus micheneri Rightmyer, 2008
- Triepeolus michiganensis Mitchell, 1962
- Triepeolus micropygius Robertson, 1903
- Triepeolus mitchelli Hurd, 1979
- Triepeolus mojavensis Linsley, 1939
- Triepeolus monardae Mitchell, 1962
- Triepeolus nayaritensis Rightmyer, 2008
- Triepeolus nemoralis (Holmberg, 1886)
- Triepeolus nevadensis (Cresson, 1878)
- Triepeolus nigrihirtus Mitchell, 1962
- Triepeolus nisibonensis Genaro, 2001
- Triepeolus norae Cockerell, 1907
- Triepeolus obliteratus Graenicher, 1911
- Triepeolus occidentalis (Cresson, 1878)
- Triepeolus osiriformis (Schrottky, 1910)
- Triepeolus pacis Cockerell, 1925
- Triepeolus paenepectoralis Viereck, 1905
- Triepeolus parkeri Rightmyer, 2008
- Triepeolus partitus Rightmyer, 2008
- Triepeolus parvidiversipes Rightmyer, 2008
- Triepeolus parvus Rightmyer, 2008
- Triepeolus pectoralis (Robertson, 1897)
- Triepeolus penicilliferus (Brues, 1903)
- Triepeolus permixtus (Cockerell, 1923)
- Triepeolus perpictus Rightmyer, 2008
- Triepeolus phaeopygus Rightmyer, 2008
- Triepeolus pomonalis Cockerell, 1916
- Triepeolus punctoclypeus Rightmyer, 2008
- Triepeolus quadratus Rightmyer, 2008
- Triepeolus quadrifasciatus (Say, 1823)
- Triepeolus remigatus (Fabricius, 1804)
- Triepeolus rhododontus Cockerell, 1921
- Triepeolus robustus (Cresson, 1878)
- Triepeolus rohweri Cockerell, 1911
- Triepeolus roni Genaro, 1999
- Triepeolus rufithorax Graenicher, 1928
- Triepeolus rufoclypeus (Fox, 1891)
- Triepeolus rufotegularis (Ashmead, 1900)
- Triepeolus rugosus Mitchell, 1962
- Triepeolus rugulosus (Cockerell, 1917)
- Triepeolus sarothrinus (Cockerell, 1929)
- Triepeolus saturninus Cockerell & Sandhouse, 1924
- Triepeolus scelestus (Cresson, 1878)
- Triepeolus schwarzi Cockerell, 1921
- Triepeolus segregatus (Cockerell, 1900)
- Triepeolus sequior Cockerell, 1921
- Triepeolus simplex Robertson, 1903
- Triepeolus simulatus Rightmyer, 2008
- Triepeolus subalpinus Cockerell, 1910
- Triepeolus sublunatus Cockerell, 1907
- Triepeolus subnitens Cockerell & Timberlake, 1929
- Triepeolus tanneri Cockerell, 1928
- Triepeolus tepanecus (Cresson, 1878)
- Triepeolus texanus (Cresson, 1878)
- Triepeolus timberlakei Cockerell, 1929
- Triepeolus totonacus (Cresson, 1878)
- Triepeolus townsendi Cockerell, 1907
- Triepeolus tristis (Smith, 1854)
- Triepeolus utahensis (Cockerell, 1921)
- Triepeolus ventralis (Meade-Waldo, 1913)
- Triepeolus verbesinae (Cockerell, 1897)
- Triepeolus vernus Rightmyer, 2008
- Triepeolus vicinus (Cresson, 1865)
- Triepeolus victori Genaro, 1998
- Triepeolus warriti Rightmyer, 2008
- Triepeolus wilsoni (Cresson, 1865)
- Triepeolus zacatecus (Cresson, 1878)
