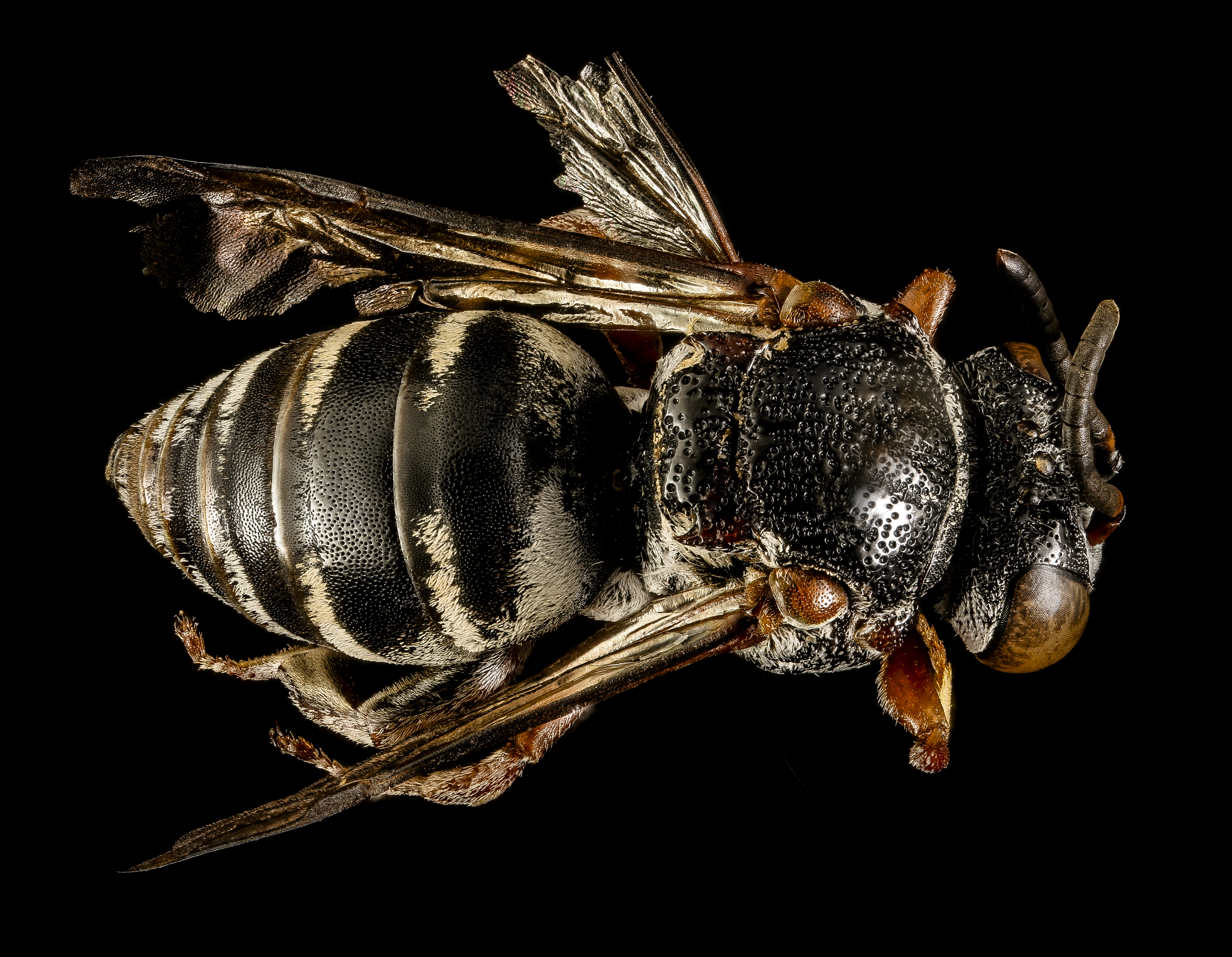

Scientific classification
- Kingdom: Animalia
- Phylum: Arthropoda
- Clade: Pancrustacea
- Class: Insecta
- Order: Hymenoptera
- Family: Apidae
- Tribe: Epeolini
- Genus: Epeolus
- Species: E. lectoides

Binomial name
- Epeolus lectoides Robertson, 1901

= Epeolus lectoides =

Species of bee

Epeolus lectoides, the cuckoo bee, is a species of cuckoo bee in the family Apidae. It is found in North America. Hosts include Colletes latitarsis and Colletes nudus.
