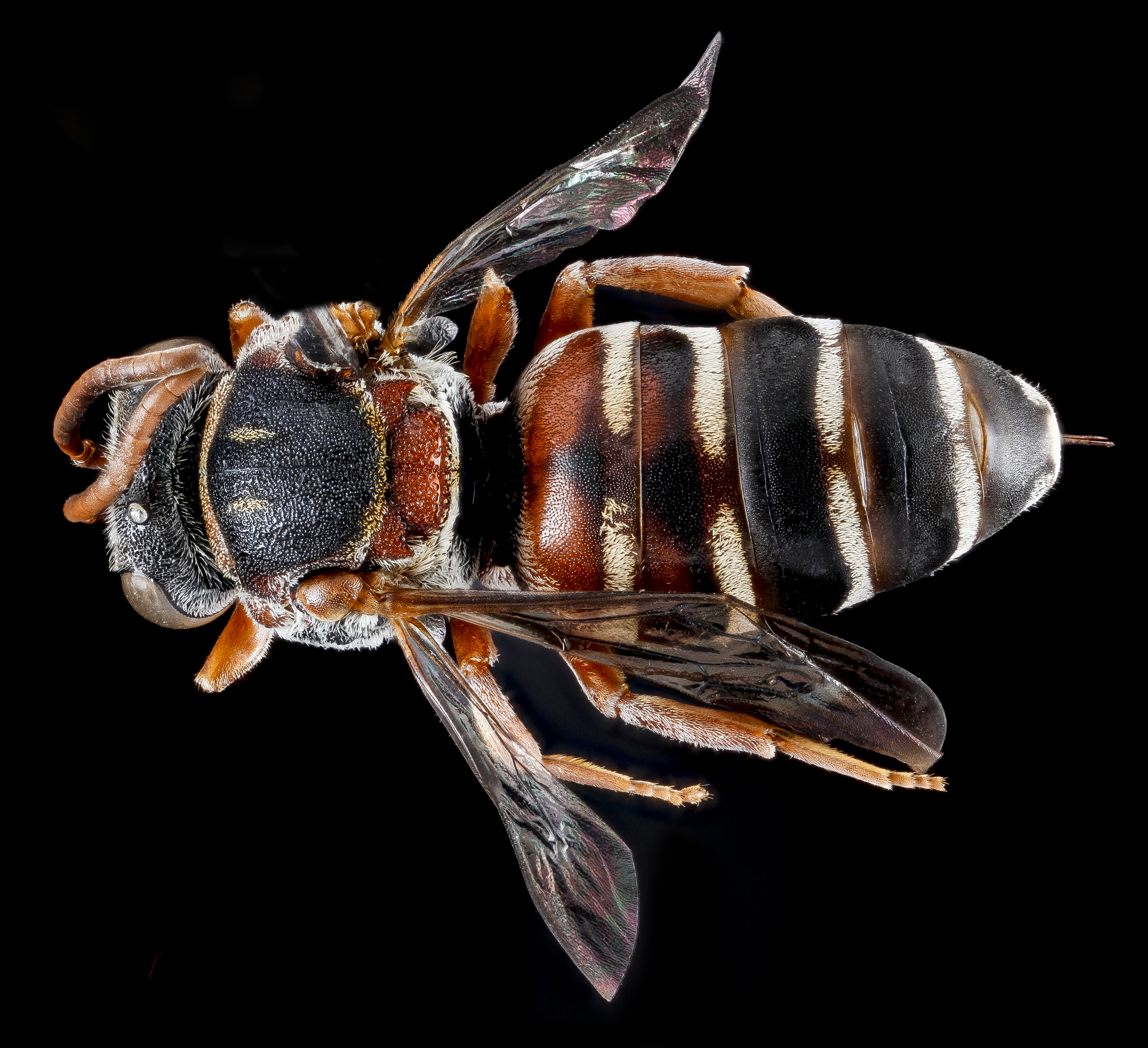

Scientific classification
- Kingdom: Animalia
- Phylum: Arthropoda
- Class: Insecta
- Order: Hymenoptera
- Family: Apidae
- Tribe: Epeolini
- Genus: Epeolus
- Species: E. zonatus

Binomial name
- Epeolus zonatus Smith, 1854

= Epeolus zonatus =

Species of bee

Epeolus zonatus is a species of cuckoo bee in the family Apidae. It is found in North America.
