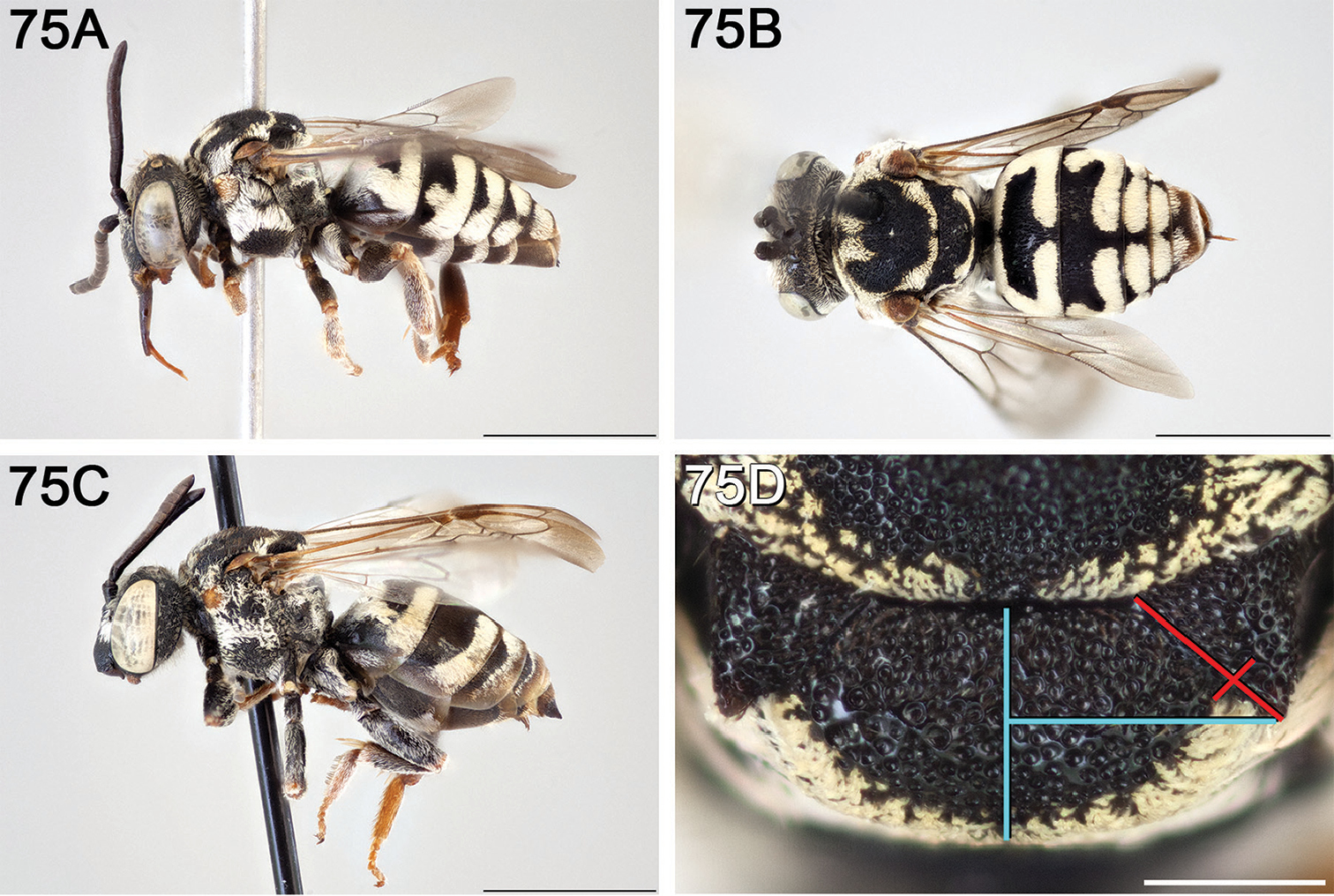

Scientific classification
- Kingdom: Animalia
- Phylum: Arthropoda
- Class: Insecta
- Order: Hymenoptera
- Family: Apidae
- Tribe: Epeolini
- Genus: Epeolus
- Species: E. olympiellus

Binomial name
- Epeolus olympiellus Cockerell, 1904

= Epeolus olympiellus =

Species of bee

Epeolus olympiellus is a species of cuckoo bee in the family Apidae. It is found in North America.
