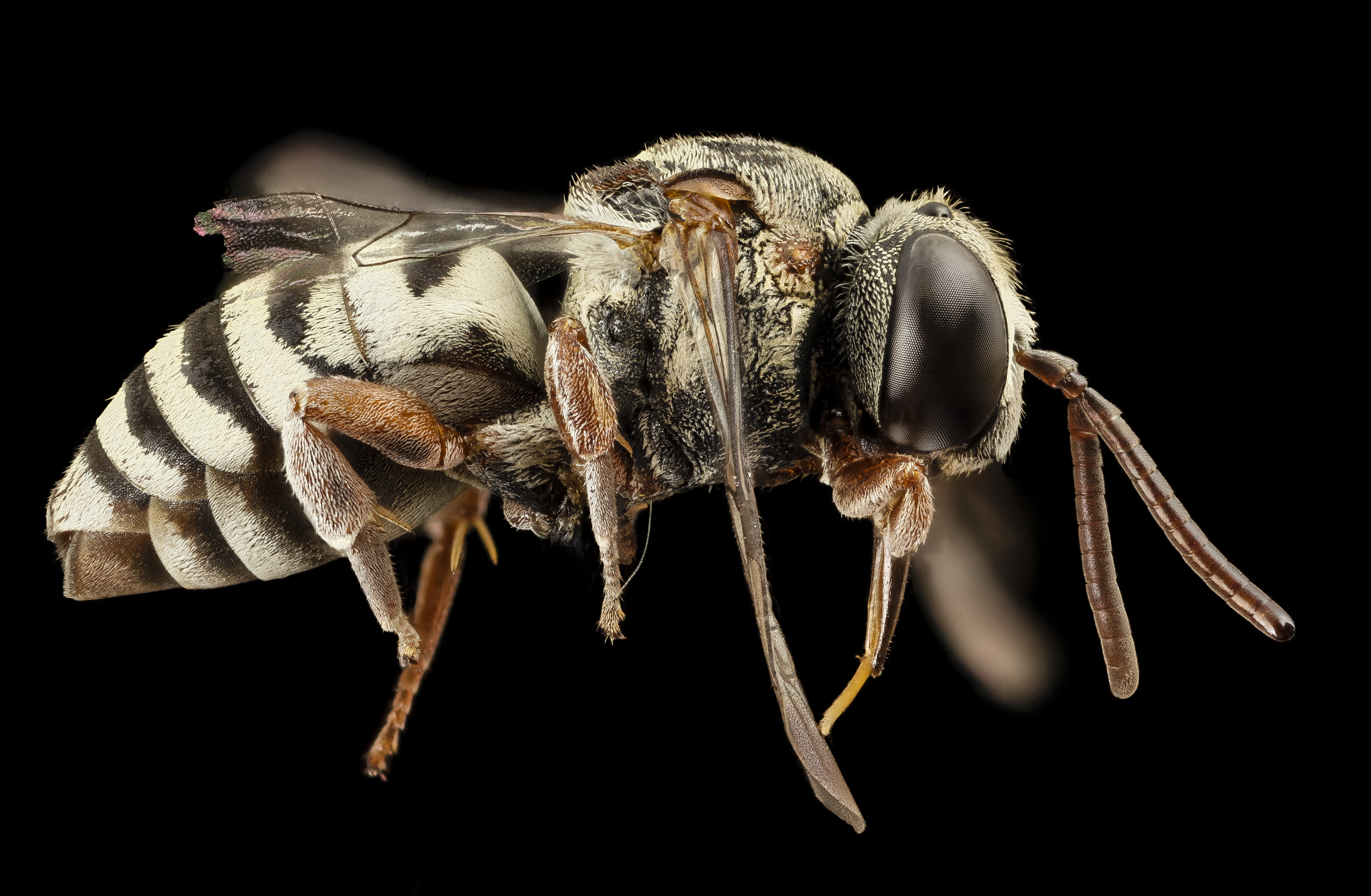
- Epeolus australis

Scientific classification
- Kingdom: Animalia
- Phylum: Arthropoda
- Clade: Pancrustacea
- Class: Insecta
- Order: Hymenoptera
- Family: Apidae
- Tribe: Epeolini
- Genus: Epeolus; Latreille, 1802

Type species
- Epeolus variegatus (Linnaeus, 1758)

Species
- see text

= Epeolus =

Genus of bees

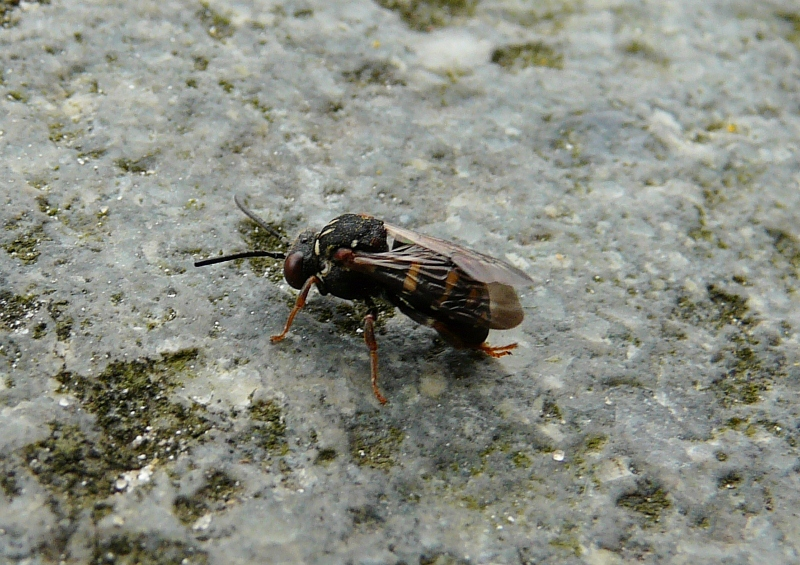
Epeolus tarsalis

Epeolus is a genus of cuckoo bees in the family Apidae. They are often known as variegated cuckoo-bees. The species are uncommon to rare, and has strong patterns of black and white on the thorax and abdomen. These patterns are made of tiny fat hairs lying flush with the integument or "skin" of the bee. Species of the genus are easily mistaken for those of the genus Triepeolus, but are often smaller.

== Biology ==
Species within the genus Epeolus are medium-sized bees with bright patterns. There are currently approximately 100 species described from throughout the world. All known species of the genus Epeolus are cleptoparasites of mining bees of the genus Colletes. The female enters the nesting excavated by the female Colletes bee and lays an egg in an unsealed cell. The Epeolus larva then consumes the egg of the host bee and then feeds on the pollen the Colletes bee provisioned the cell with for her offspring. Epeolus bees may be rather obvious and easily observed in the vicinity of the nesting aggregations of their hosts and often use the same flowers to feed on. Colletes bees line their nesting cells with a cellophane like covering which they exude from the Dufour's gland to protect the cell from moisture and fungal infection, female Epeolus bees have spines on the end of their abdomens which they use to pierce u-shaped holes in this covering so that she can oviposit between its layers, she also secretes a small amount of glue so that the egg adheres to the cell.

== Species ==
The following species are currently classified in the genus Epeolus:

- Epeolus ainsliei Crawford, 1932
- Epeolus alatus Friese, 1922
- Epeolus alpinus Friese, 1893
- Epeolus amabilis Gerstäcker, 1869
- Epeolus americanus (Cresson, 1878)
- Epeolus anticus (Walker, 1871)
- Epeolus arciferus Cockerell, 1924
- Epeolus asperatus Cockerell, 1909
- Epeolus asperrimus (Moure, 1954)
- Epeolus assamensis Meade-Waldo, 1913
- Epeolus aureovestitus Dours, 1873
- Epeolus australis Mitchell, 1962
- Epeolus autumnalis Robertson, 1902
- Epeolus banksi (Cockerell, 1907)
- Epeolus barberiellus Cockerell, 1907
- Epeolus beulahensis Cockerell, 1904
- Epeolus bifasciatus Cresson, 1864
- Epeolus bischoffi (Mavromoustakis, 1954)
- Epeolus boliviensis Friese, 1908
- Epeolus caffer (Lepeletier, 1841)
- Epeolus canadensis Mitchell, 1962
- Epeolus carioca (Moure, 1954)
- Epeolus carolinus Mitchell, 1962
- Epeolus cestus Eardley, 1991
- Epeolus claripennis Friese, 1908
- Epeolus collaris Pérez, 1895
- Epeolus compactus Cresson, 1878
- Epeolus compar Alfken, 1937
- Epeolus coreanus Yasumatsu, 1933
- Epeolus corniculatus Bischoff, 1923
- Epeolus cruciger (Panzer, 1799)
- Epeolus crucis Cockerell, 1904
- Epeolus diodontus Cockerell, 1934
- Epeolus erigeronis Mitchell, 1962
- Epeolus fallax Morawitz, 1872
- Epeolus fasciatus Friese, 1895
- Epeolus fervidus Smith, 1879
- Epeolus flavociliatus Friese, 1899
- Epeolus flavofasciatus Smith, 1879
- Epeolus floridensis Mitchell, 1962
- Epeolus friesei Brauns, 1903
- Epeolus fulviventris Bischoff, 1923
- Epeolus fulvopilosus Cameron, 1902
- Epeolus fumipennis Say, 1837
- Epeolus gabrielis Cockerell, 1909
- Epeolus gianellii Gribodo, 1894
- Epeolus glabratus Cresson, 1878
- Epeolus hitei Cockerell, 1908
- Epeolus howardi Mitchell, 1962
- Epeolus humillimus Cockerell, 1918
- Epeolus ibericus Bogusch, 2018
- Epeolus ilicis Mitchell, 1962
- Epeolus intermedius Pérez, 1884
- Epeolus interruptus Robertson, 1900
- Epeolus iranicus Bogusch, 2021
- Epeolus ishikawai Tadauchi & Schwarz, 1999
- Epeolus japonicus Bischoff, 1930
- Epeolus julliani Pérez, 1884
- Epeolus kristenseni Friese, 1915
- Epeolus lanhami Mitchell, 1962
- Epeolus lectoides Robertson, 1901
- Epeolus lectus Cresson, 1878
- Epeolus luteipennis Friese, 1917
- Epeolus lutzi Cockerell, 1921
- Epeolus melectiformis Yasumatsu, 1938
- Epeolus melectimimus Cockerell & Sandhouse, 1924
- Epeolus mercatus Fabricius, 1804
- Epeolus mesillae (Cockerell, 1895)
- Epeolus minimus (Robertson, 1902)
- Epeolus minutus Radoszkowski, 1888
- Epeolus montanus (Cresson, 1878)
- Epeolus natalensis Smith, 1879
- Epeolus niger (Michener, 1954)
- Epeolus novomexicanus Cockerell, 1912
- Epeolus odontothorax (Michener, 1954)
- Epeolus olympiellus Cockerell, 1904
- Epeolus peregrinus Cockerell, 1911
- Epeolus pictus Nylander, 1848
- Epeolus pilatei Cockerell, 1924
- Epeolus priesneri Bogusch, 2021
- Epeolus productuloides Bogusch, 2018
- Epeolus productulus Bischoff, 1930
- Epeolus productus Bischoff, 1930
- Epeolus pubescens Cockerell, 1937
- Epeolus pulchellus Cresson, 1865
- Epeolus pusillus Cresson, 1864
- Epeolus pygmaeorum Cockerell, 1932
- Epeolus rubrostictus Cockerell & Sandhouse, 1924
- Epeolus rufomaculatus Cockerell & Sandhouse, 1924
- Epeolus rufothoracicus Bischoff, 1923
- Epeolus rufulus Cockerell, 1941
- Epeolus rugosus Cockerell, 1949
- Epeolus schraderi (Michener, 1954)
- Epeolus schummeli Schilling, 1849
- Epeolus scutellaris Say, 1824
- Epeolus seraxensis Radoszkowski, 1893
- Epeolus siculus Giordani Soika, 1944
- Epeolus sigillatus Alfken, 1930
- Epeolus tarsalis Morawitz, 1874
- Epeolus tibetanus Meade-Waldo, 1913
- Epeolus transitorius Eversmann, 1852
- Epeolus tristicolor Viereck, 1905
- Epeolus tristis Smith, 1854
- Epeolus tsushimensis Cockerell, 1926
- Epeolus turcicus Bogusch, 2018
- Epeolus variegatus (Linnaeus, 1758)
- Epeolus variolosus (Holmberg, 1886)
- Epeolus vernalis Mitchell, 1962
- Epeolus vinogradovi Popov, 1952
- Epeolus warnckei Bogusch, 2018
- Epeolus weemsi Mitchell, 1962
- Epeolus zonatus Smith, 1854
