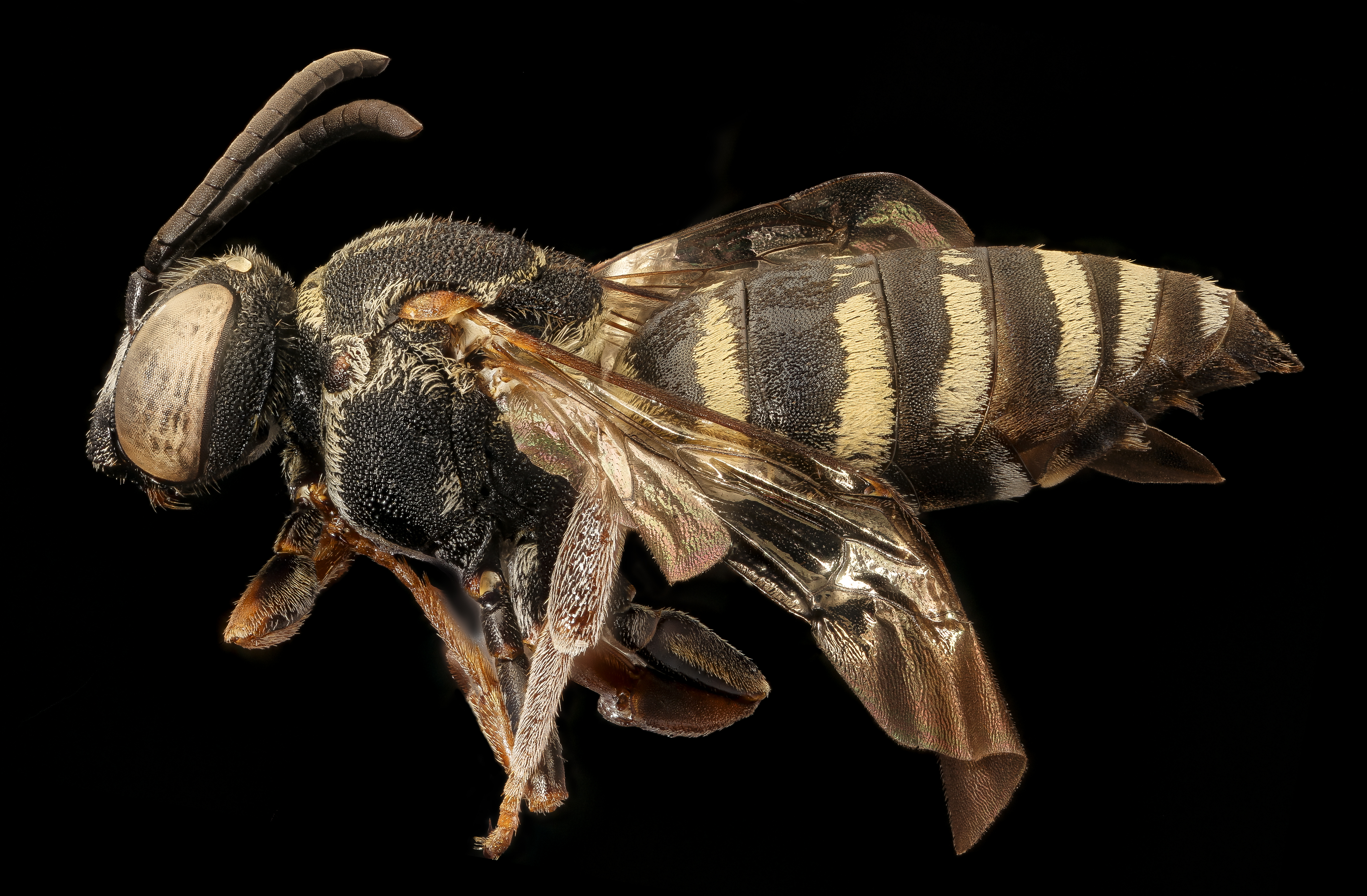

Scientific classification
- Domain: Eukaryota
- Kingdom: Animalia
- Phylum: Arthropoda
- Class: Insecta
- Order: Hymenoptera
- Family: Apidae
- Tribe: Epeolini
- Genus: Epeolus
- Species: E. autumnalis

Binomial name
- Epeolus autumnalis Robertson, 1902

= Epeolus autumnalis =

Species of bee

Epeolus autumnalis, the cuckoo bee, is a species of cuckoo bee in the family Apidae. It is found in North America.
