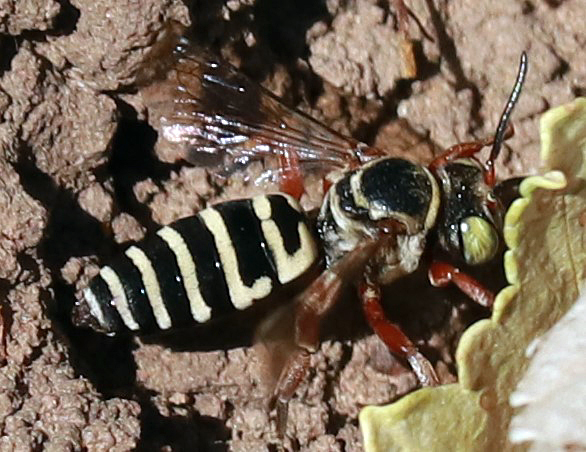
- Triepeolus subnitens, Texas

Scientific classification
- Kingdom: Animalia
- Phylum: Arthropoda
- Clade: Pancrustacea
- Class: Insecta
- Order: Hymenoptera
- Family: Apidae
- Tribe: Epeolini
- Subtribe: Thalestriina
- Genus: Triepeolus
- Species: T. subnitens

Binomial name
- Triepeolus subnitens Cockerell & Timberlake, 1929

= Triepeolus subnitens =

Species of bees

Triepeolus subnitens is a species of cuckoo bee in the family Apidae. They are found in North America.
