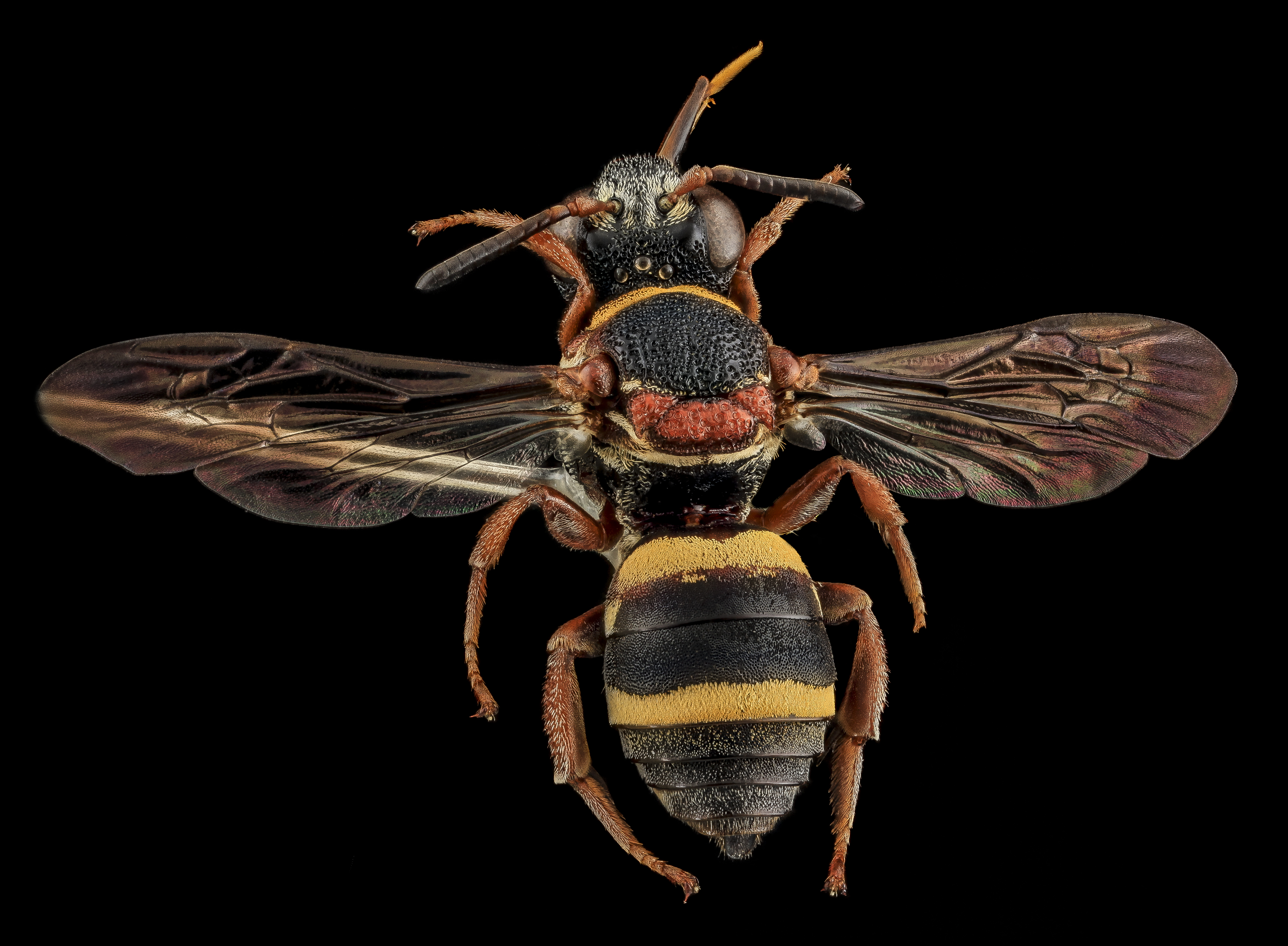

Scientific classification
- Domain: Eukaryota
- Kingdom: Animalia
- Phylum: Arthropoda
- Class: Insecta
- Order: Hymenoptera
- Family: Apidae
- Genus: Epeolus
- Species: E. bifasciatus

Binomial name
- Epeolus bifasciatus Cresson, 1864

= Epeolus bifasciatus =

Species of bee

Epeolus bifasciatus is a species of cuckoo bee in the family Apidae. It is found in Central America and North America. It is a parasite of Colletes latitarsis.
