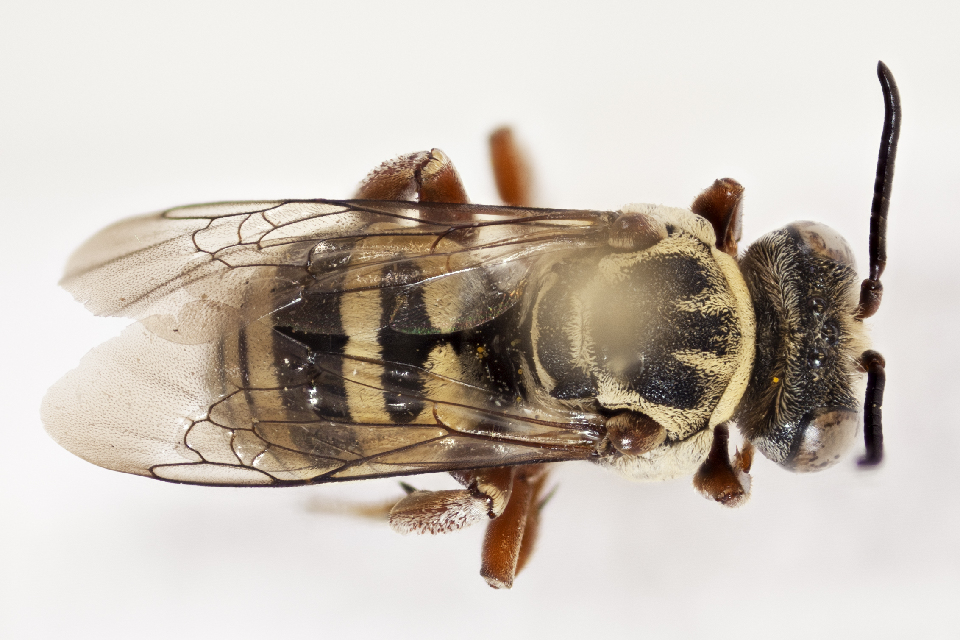

Scientific classification
- Kingdom: Animalia
- Phylum: Arthropoda
- Class: Insecta
- Order: Hymenoptera
- Family: Apidae
- Subtribe: Thalestriina
- Genus: Triepeolus
- Species: T. martini

Binomial name
- Triepeolus martini (Cockerell, 1900)

Synonyms
- Triepeolus fortis Cockerell, 1921; Triepeolus insolitus Cockerell, 1921; Triepeolus trilobatus Cockerell, 1921

= Triepeolus martini =

Species of bee

Triepeolus martini is a species of cuckoo bee in the family Apidae. It is found in the United States and Mexico.
