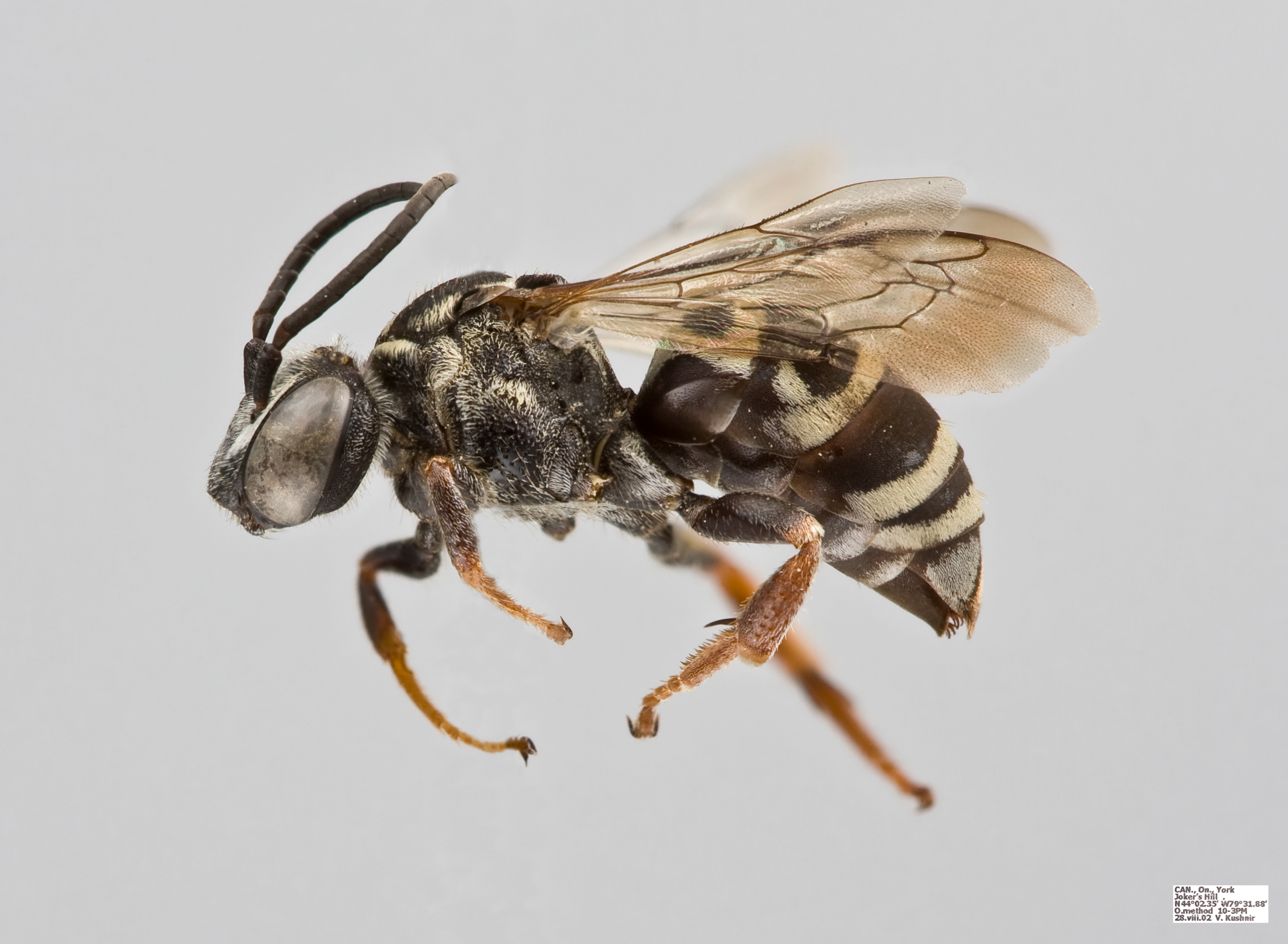

Scientific classification
- Kingdom: Animalia
- Phylum: Arthropoda
- Class: Insecta
- Order: Hymenoptera
- Family: Apidae
- Subtribe: Thalestriina
- Genus: Triepeolus
- Species: T. pectoralis

Binomial name
- Triepeolus pectoralis (Robertson, 1897)

Synonyms
- Epeolus oswegoensis Mitchell, 1962

= Triepeolus pectoralis =

Species of bee

Triepeolus pectoralis is a species of cuckoo bee in the family Apidae. It is found in North America.
