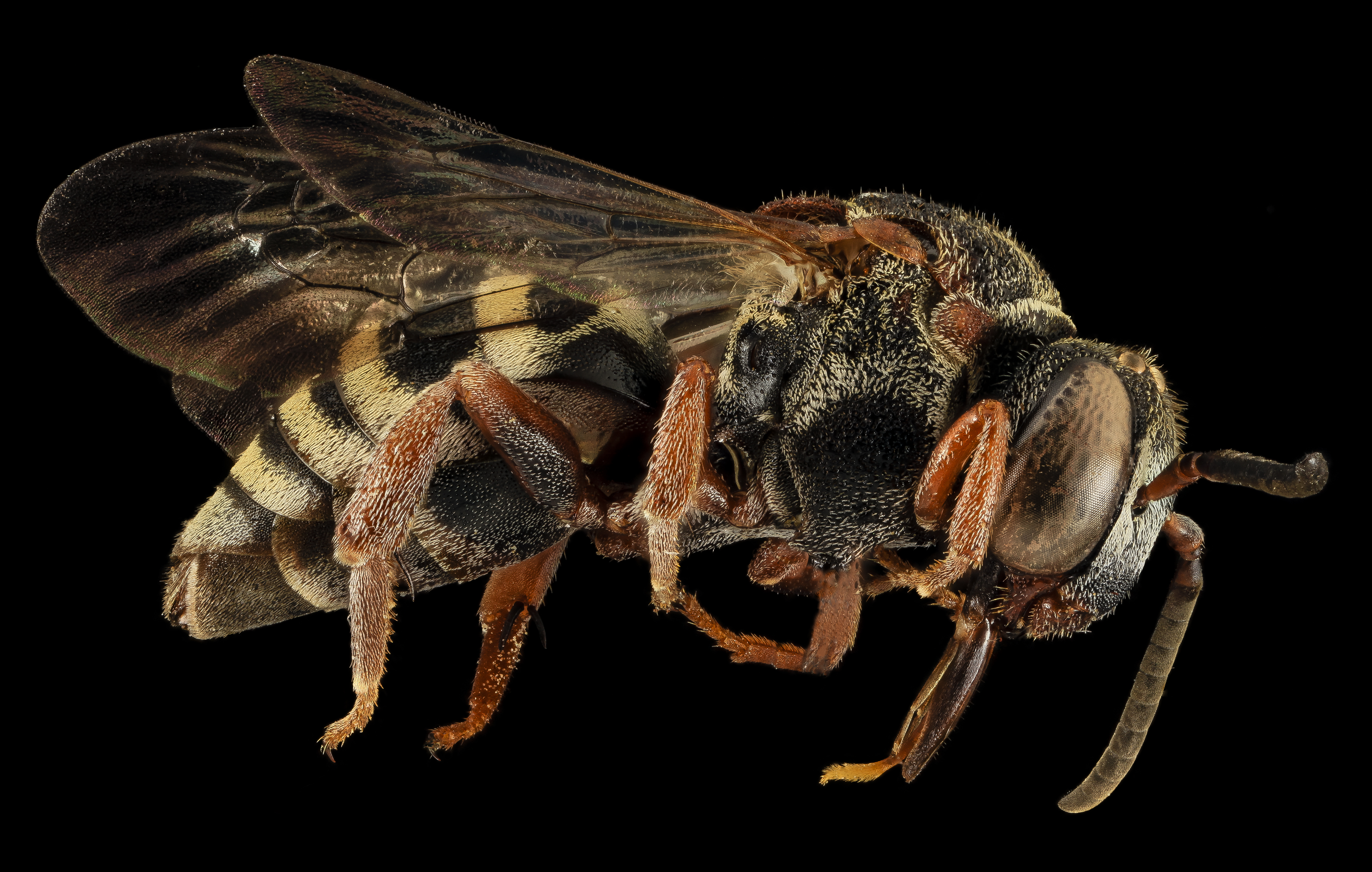

Scientific classification
- Kingdom: Animalia
- Phylum: Arthropoda
- Class: Insecta
- Order: Hymenoptera
- Family: Apidae
- Genus: Epeolus
- Species: E. scutellaris

Binomial name
- Epeolus scutellaris Say, 1824

= Epeolus scutellaris =

Species of bee

Epeolus scutellaris, the red-chested cuckoo nomad bee, is a species of cuckoo bee in the family Apidae. It is found in the United States and Mexico.
