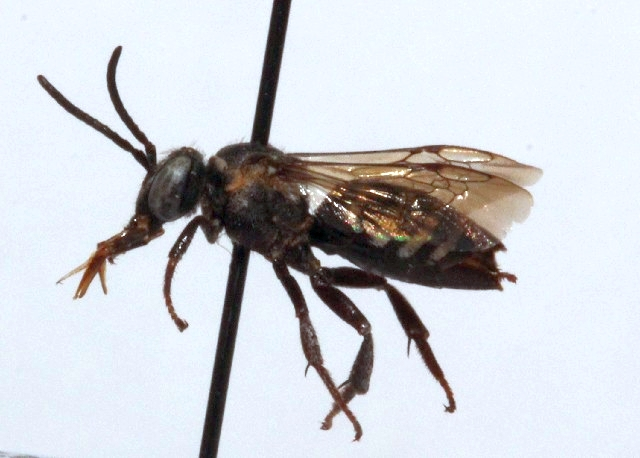

Scientific classification
- Kingdom: Animalia
- Phylum: Arthropoda
- Class: Insecta
- Order: Hymenoptera
- Family: Apidae
- Subtribe: Thalestriina
- Genus: Triepeolus
- Species: T. brittaini

Binomial name
- Triepeolus brittaini Cockerell, 1931

Synonyms
- Triepeolus charlottensis Mitchell, 1962

= Triepeolus brittaini =

Species of bee

Triepeolus brittaini is a species of cuckoo bee in the family Apidae. It is found in North America.
