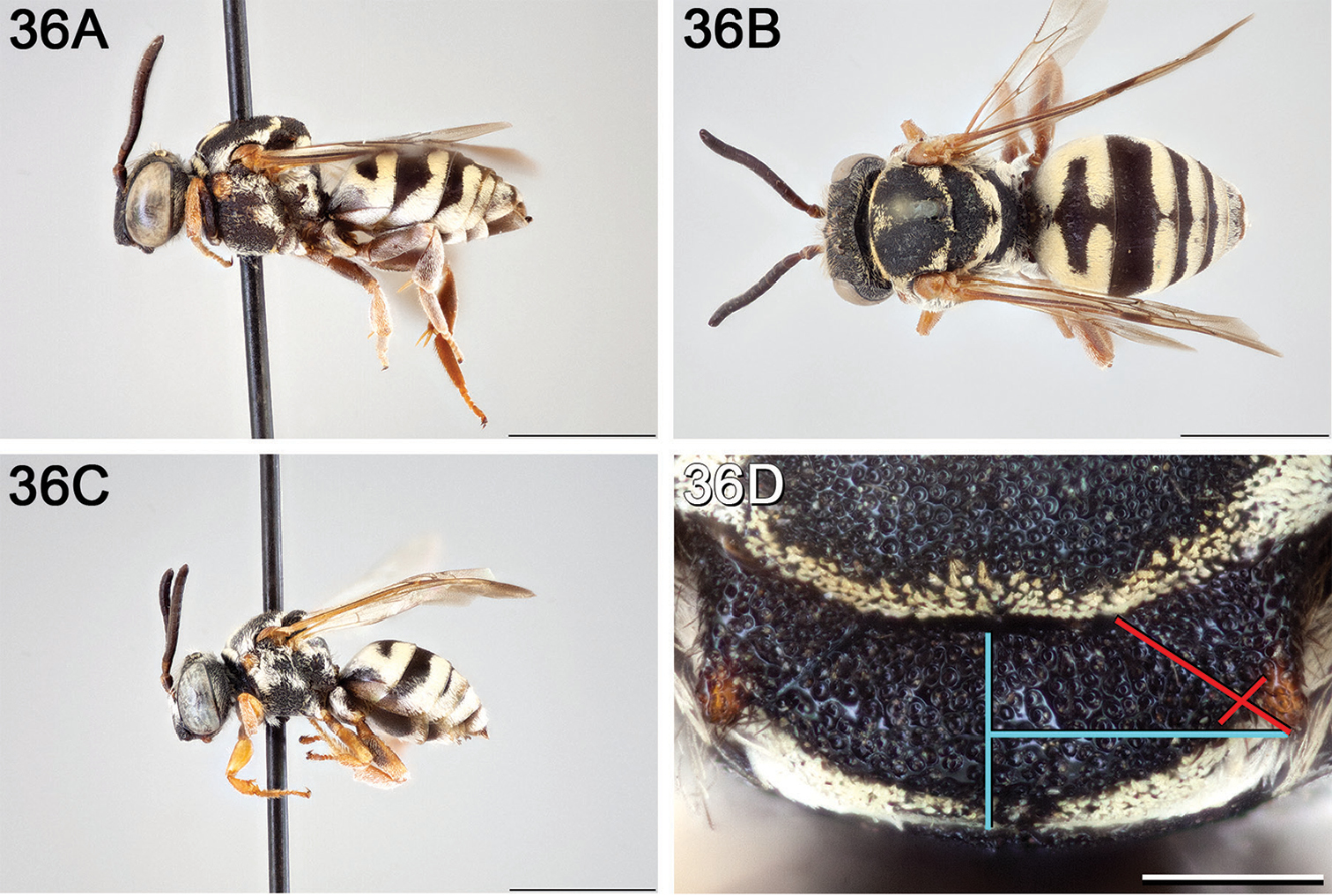

Scientific classification
- Kingdom: Animalia
- Phylum: Arthropoda
- Class: Insecta
- Order: Hymenoptera
- Family: Apidae
- Genus: Epeolus
- Species: E. compactus

Binomial name
- Epeolus compactus Cresson, 1878

= Epeolus compactus =

Species of bee

Epeolus compactus is a species of cuckoo bee in the family Apidae. It is found in the United States and Mexico. It is a parasite of Colletes kincaidii, with females laying eggs in the host species' nest.
