= Triepeolus grindeliae =

Scientific classification
- Kingdom: Animalia
- Phylum: Arthropoda
- Class: Insecta
- Order: Hymenoptera
- Family: Apidae
- Subtribe: Thalestriina
- Genus: Triepeolus
- Species: T. grindeliae

Binomial name
- Triepeolus grindeliae Cockerell, 1907

Species of bee

Triepeolus grindeliae is a species of cuckoo bee in the family Apidae. It is found in North America.
