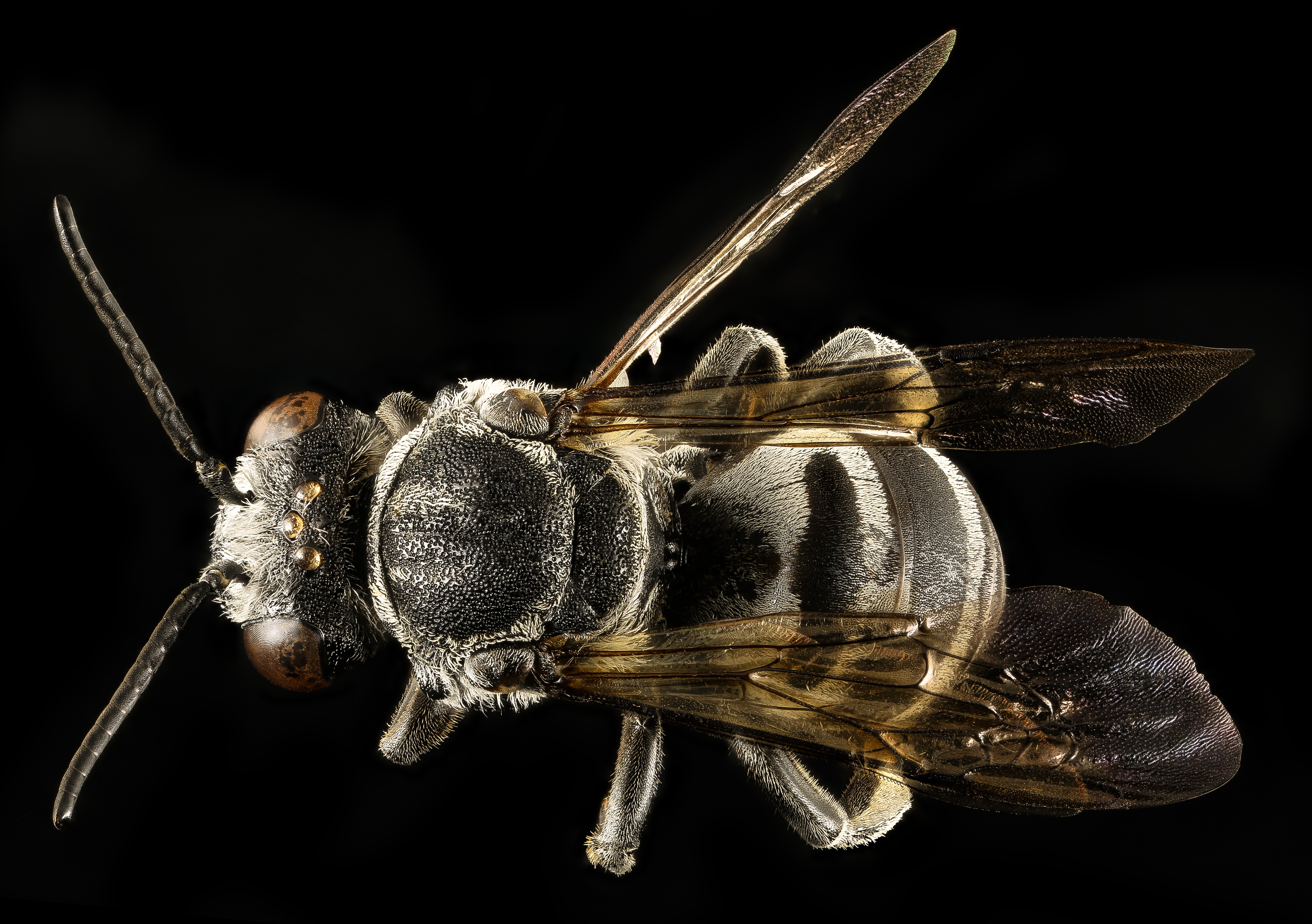
- Triepeolus donatus
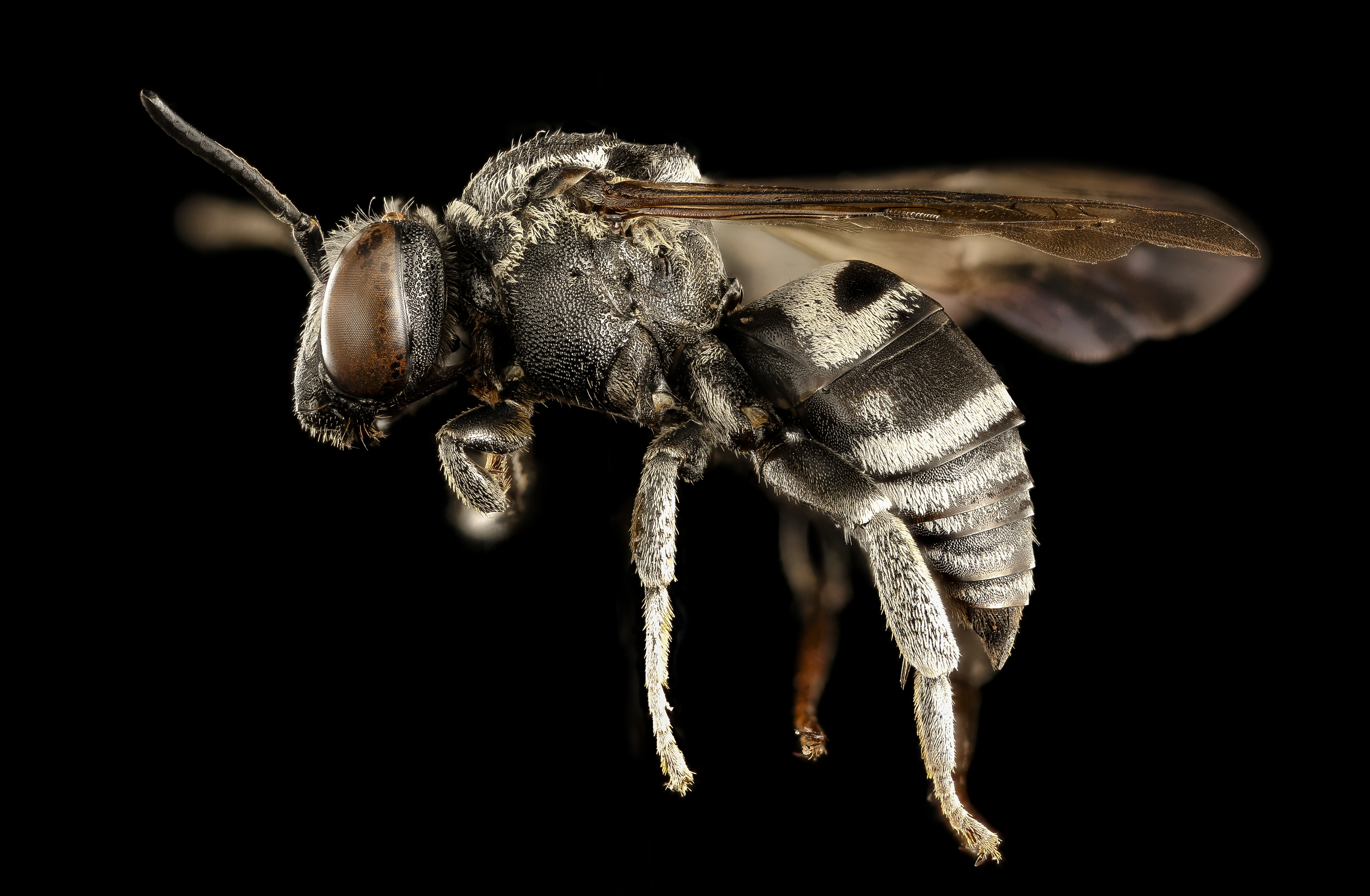
- Triepeolus donatus

Scientific classification
- Domain: Eukaryota
- Kingdom: Animalia
- Phylum: Arthropoda
- Class: Insecta
- Order: Hymenoptera
- Family: Apidae
- Genus: Triepeolus
- Species: T. donatus

Binomial name
- Triepeolus donatus (Smith, 1854)

Synonyms
- Triepeolus cirsianus Mitchell, 1962

= Triepeolus donatus =

Species of bee

Triepeolus donatus is a species of cuckoo bee in the family Apidae. It is found in North America, specifically in the United states and Canada. They are characterized by a overall black body with white strips.

== Description ==
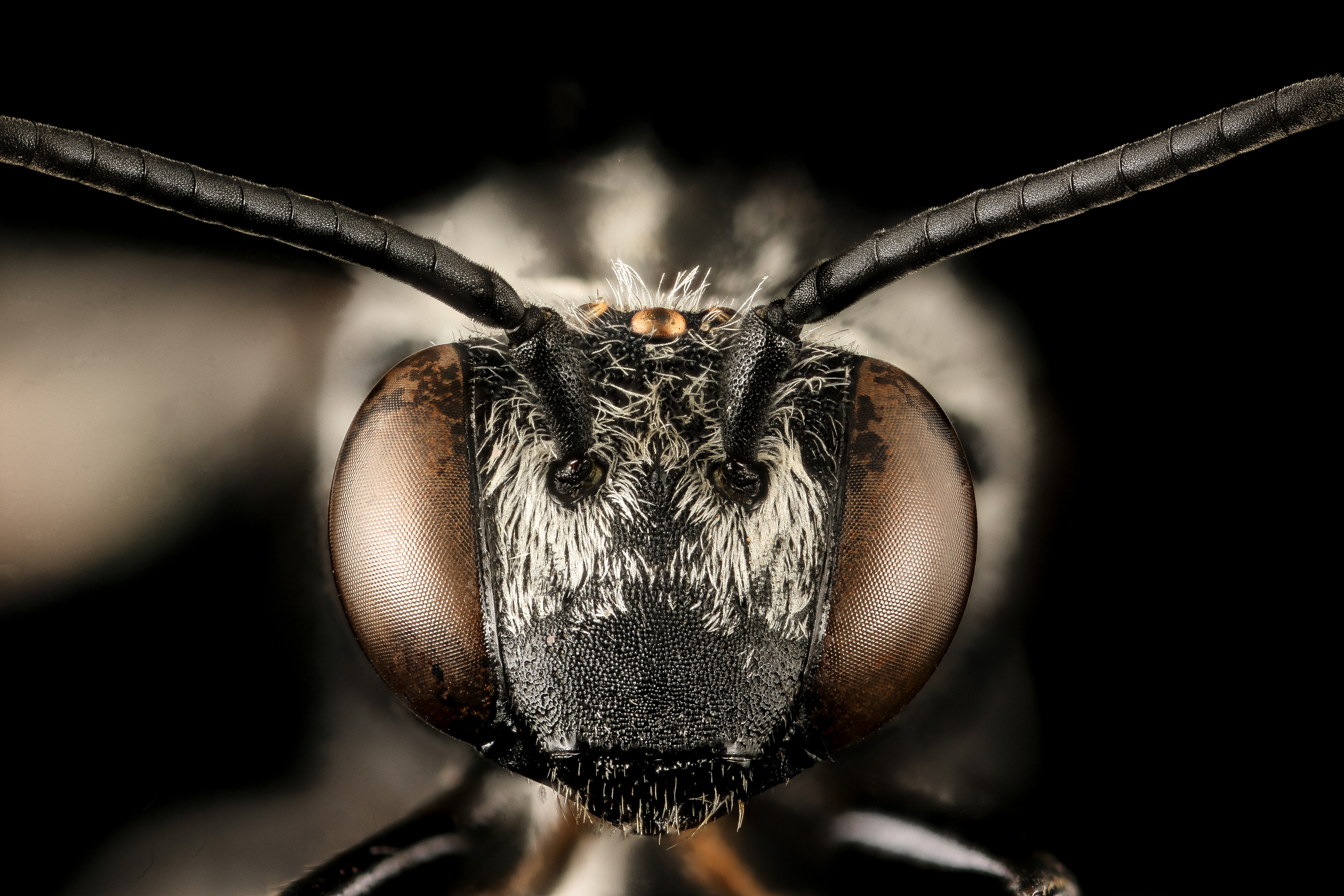
Head of Triepeolus donatus

The head of T. donatus is black and covered in short gray-white hair that is denser in regions around the antennae base in females. The lower mandibles have a reddish color. The antennae are black and females have longer segments than males. The thorax is black with grayish-white borders and a white color strip. The thorax also has many strips along it. The abdomen are black with gray-white strips on it.

The legs are brown to black on color and covered in silvery-white hairs. Populations of Triepeolus donatus in Iowa, Minnesota and North Dakota have legs that are more red in color. The wings are black on females and reddish on males. The veins of the wings are always black.

== Distribution ==
This species on located in North America, specifically in the eastern United States (Idaho, Indiana, Iowa, Minnesota, North Dakota, South Carolina, Pennsylvania, Vermont, etc) and Canada, specifically Ontario. They live in suburban and urban forest.
