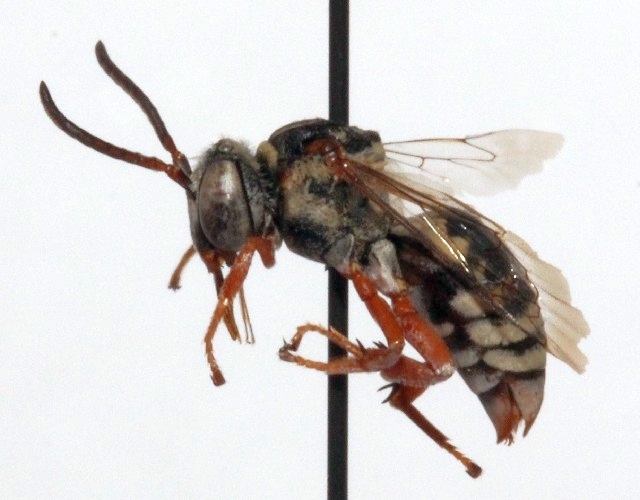

Scientific classification
- Kingdom: Animalia
- Phylum: Arthropoda
- Class: Insecta
- Order: Hymenoptera
- Family: Apidae
- Subtribe: Thalestriina
- Genus: Triepeolus
- Species: T. verbesinae

Binomial name
- Triepeolus verbesinae (Cockerell, 1897)

= Triepeolus verbesinae =

Species of bee

Triepeolus verbesinae is a species of cuckoo bee in the family Apidae. It is found in the United States and Mexico.
