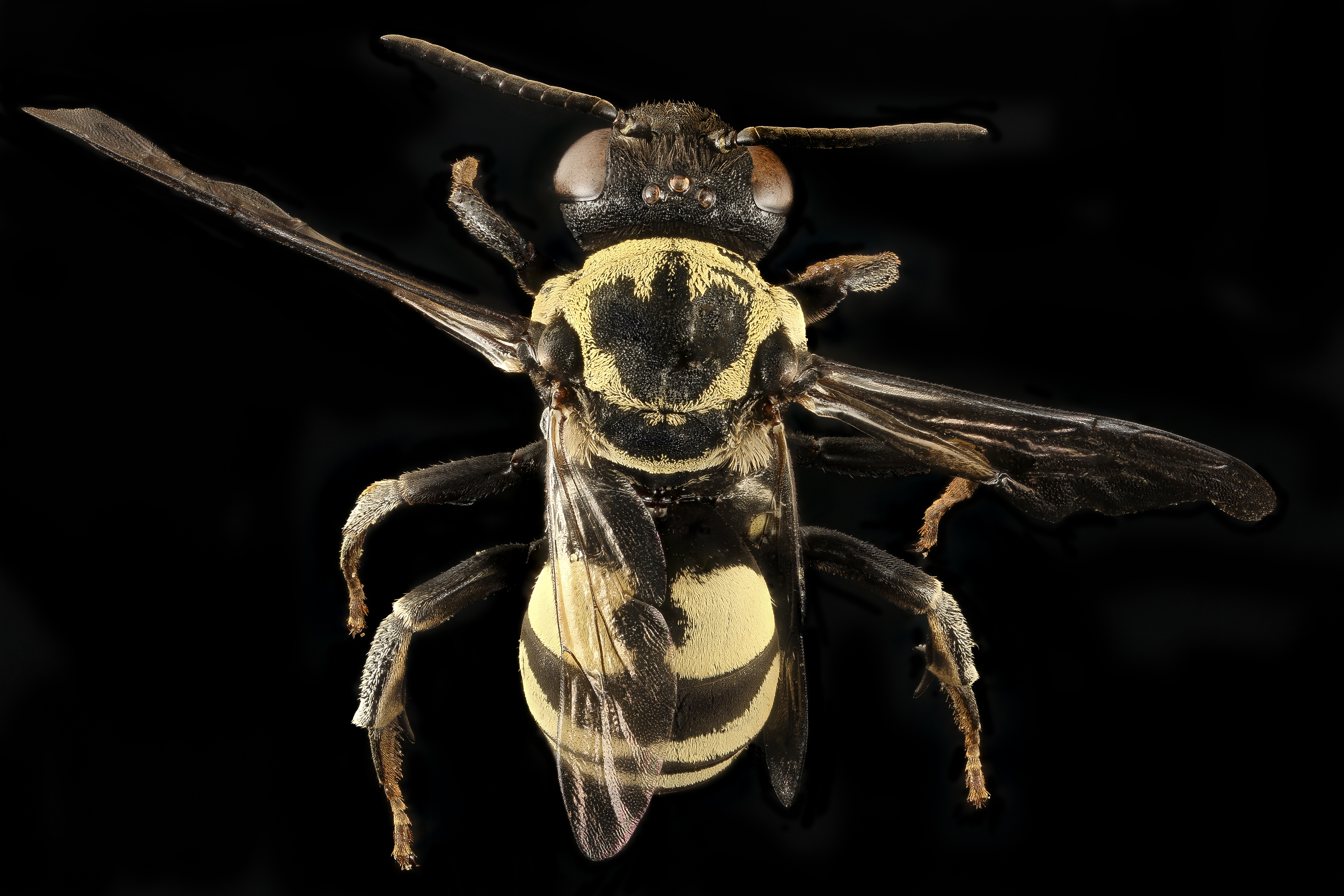

Scientific classification
- Domain: Eukaryota
- Kingdom: Animalia
- Phylum: Arthropoda
- Class: Insecta
- Order: Hymenoptera
- Family: Apidae
- Genus: Triepeolus
- Species: T. remigatus

Binomial name
- Triepeolus remigatus (Fabricius, 1804)

Synonyms
- Triepeolus superbus (Provancher, 1895); Triepeolus texanus nigripes (Cockerell, 1898)

= Triepeolus remigatus =

Species of bee

Triepeolus remigatus is a species of cuckoo bee in the family Apidae. It is found in the United States and Mexico.
