= Triepeolus loomisorum =

Scientific classification
- Domain: Eukaryota
- Kingdom: Animalia
- Phylum: Arthropoda
- Class: Insecta
- Order: Hymenoptera
- Family: Apidae
- Subtribe: Thalestriina
- Genus: Triepeolus
- Species: T. loomisorum

Binomial name
- Triepeolus loomisorum Rozen, 1989

Species of bee

Triepeolus loomisorum is a species of cuckoo bee in the family Apidae. It is found in the United States and Mexico.
