= Triepeolus intrepidus =

Scientific classification
- Domain: Eukaryota
- Kingdom: Animalia
- Phylum: Arthropoda
- Class: Insecta
- Order: Hymenoptera
- Family: Apidae
- Subtribe: Thalestriina
- Genus: Triepeolus
- Species: T. intrepidus

Binomial name
- Triepeolus intrepidus (Smith, 1879)

Synonyms
- Epeolus intrepidus Smith, 1879; Epeolus nobilis Friese, 1908; Triepeolus digueti Cockerell, 1905

Species of bee

Triepeolus intrepidus is a species of cuckoo bee in the family Apidae. It is found in the United States and Mexico.
