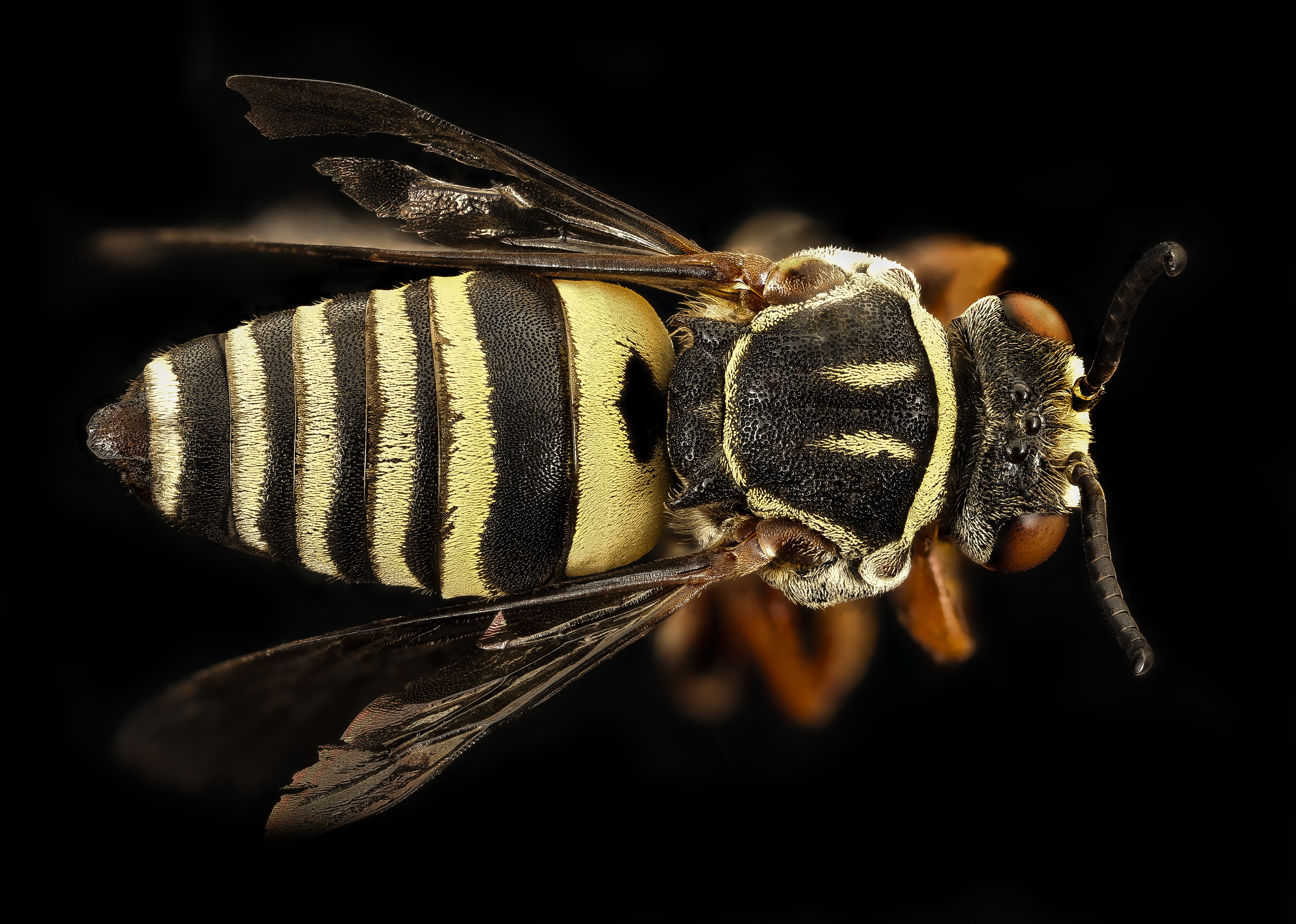

Scientific classification
- Kingdom: Animalia
- Phylum: Arthropoda
- Class: Insecta
- Order: Hymenoptera
- Family: Apidae
- Genus: Triepeolus
- Species: T. distinctus

Binomial name
- Triepeolus distinctus (Cresson, 1878)

Synonyms
- Triepeolus bardus (Cresson, 1878); Triepeolus mesillae Cockerell, 1904; Triepeolus pimarum Cockerell, 1904

= Triepeolus distinctus =

Species of bee

Triepeolus distinctus is a species of cuckoo bee in the family Apidae. It is found in North America.
