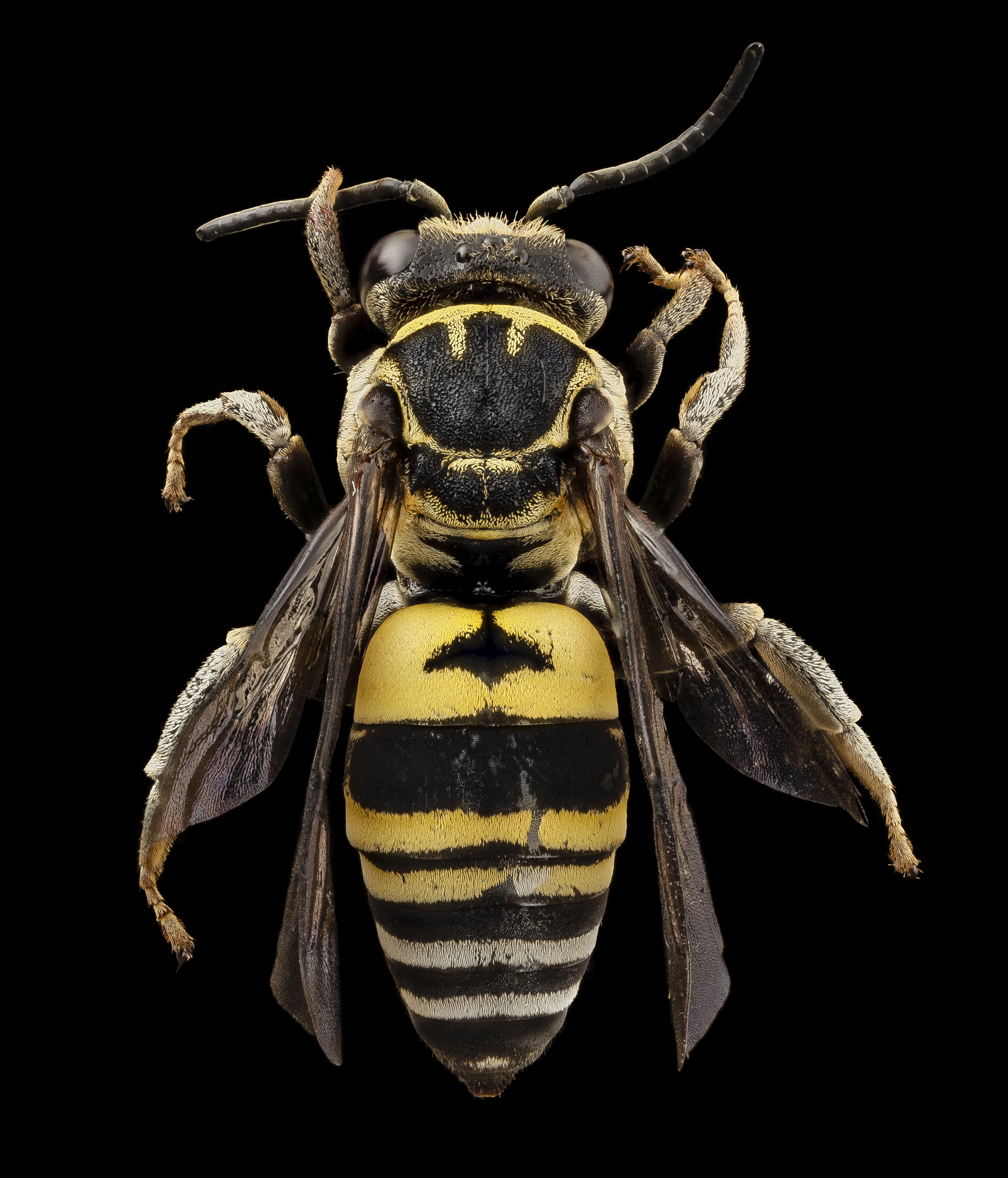

Scientific classification
- Domain: Eukaryota
- Kingdom: Animalia
- Phylum: Arthropoda
- Class: Insecta
- Order: Hymenoptera
- Family: Apidae
- Subtribe: Thalestriina
- Genus: Triepeolus
- Species: T. simplex

Binomial name
- Triepeolus simplex Robertson, 1903

= Triepeolus simplex =

Species of bee

Triepeolus simplex is one of the species of cuckoo bee in the family Apidae. It is found in North America.
