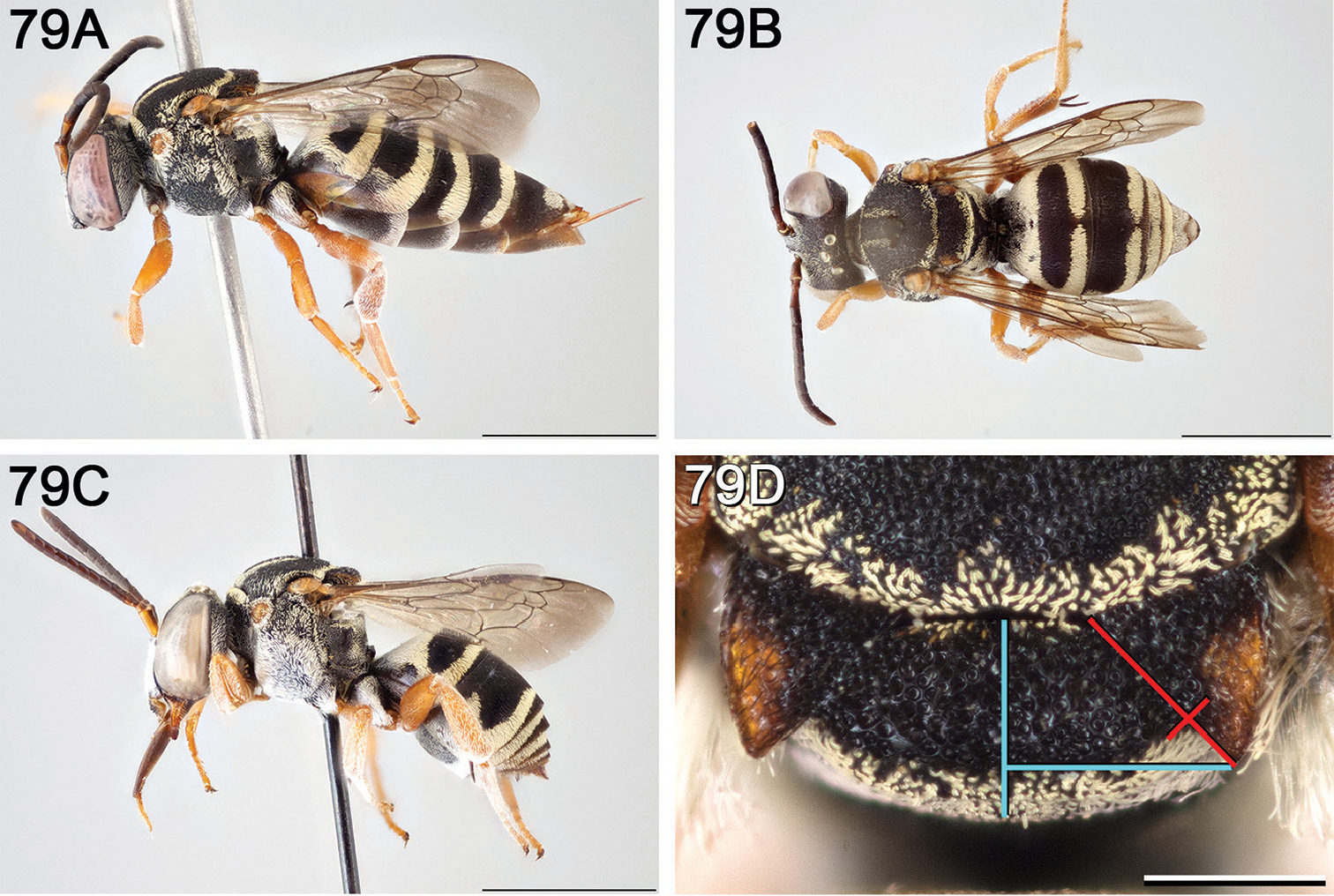
- lateral, dorsal and lateral habitus scale bar is 3 mm while the dorsal view scale bar is 0.5 mm

Scientific classification
- Kingdom: Animalia
- Phylum: Arthropoda
- Clade: Pancrustacea
- Class: Insecta
- Order: Hymenoptera
- Family: Apidae
- Genus: Epeolus
- Species: E. pusillus

Binomial name
- Epeolus pusillus Cresson, 1864

= Epeolus pusillus =

Species of bee

Epeolus pusillus is a species of cuckoo bee in the family Apidae. It is found in the United States and Mexico. The species is a parasite of Colletes compactus and Colletes ciliatoides.
