= Triepeolus rufithorax =

Scientific classification
- Domain: Eukaryota
- Kingdom: Animalia
- Phylum: Arthropoda
- Class: Insecta
- Order: Hymenoptera
- Family: Apidae
- Genus: Triepeolus
- Species: T. rufithorax

Binomial name
- Triepeolus rufithorax Graenicher, 1928

Synonyms
- Triepeolus alachuensis Mitchell, 1962

Species of bee

Triepeolus rufithorax is a species of cuckoo bee in the family Apidae. It is found in North America.
