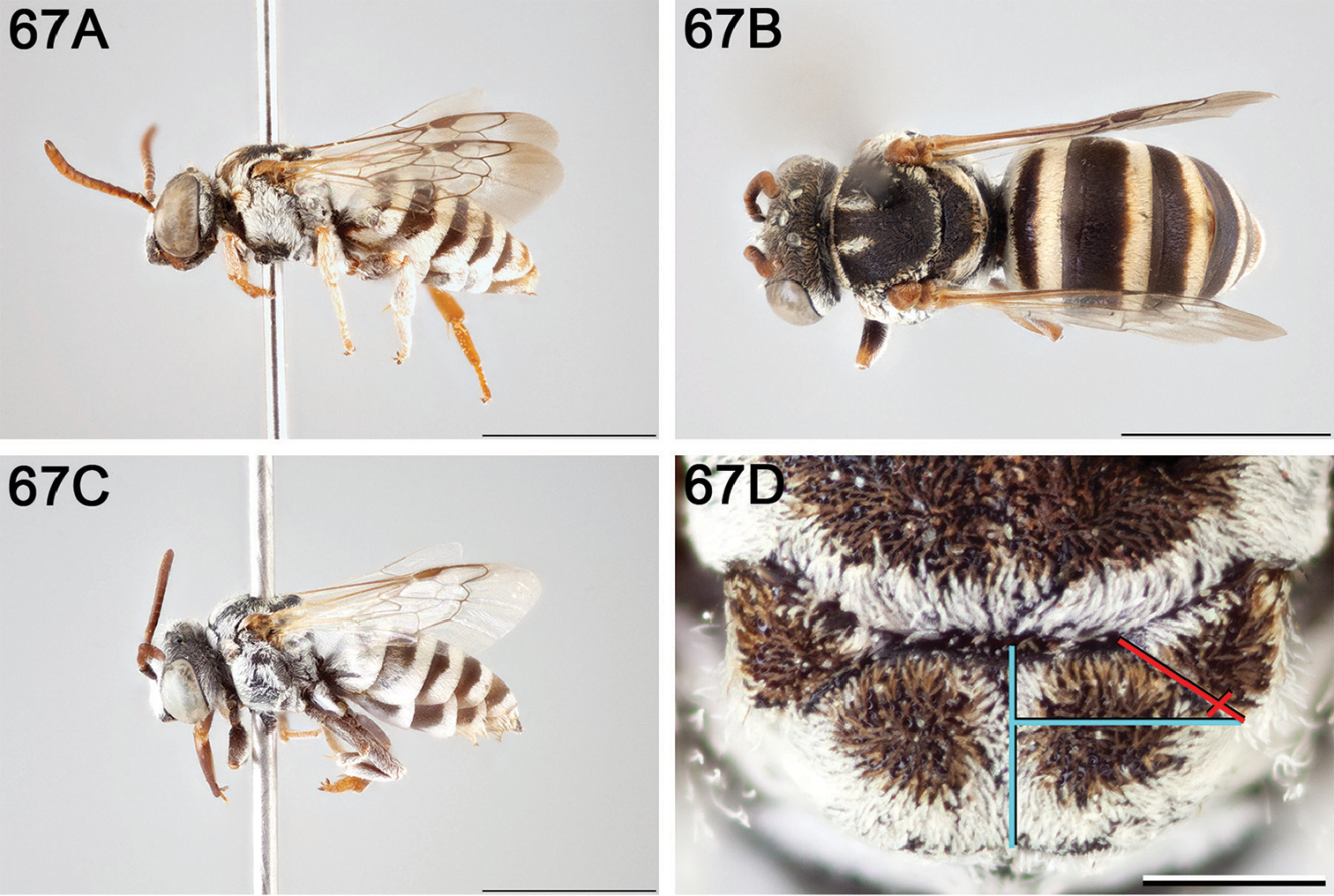

Scientific classification
- Kingdom: Animalia
- Phylum: Arthropoda
- Class: Insecta
- Order: Hymenoptera
- Family: Apidae
- Genus: Epeolus
- Species: E. mesillae

Binomial name
- Epeolus mesillae (Cockerell, 1895)

= Epeolus mesillae =

Species of bee

Epeolus mesillae is a species of cuckoo bee in the family Apidae.

== Subspecies ==
These two subspecies belong to the species Epeolus mesillae:

- Epeolus mesillae mesillae (Cockerell, 1895)
- Epeolus mesillae palmarum Linsley, 1939
