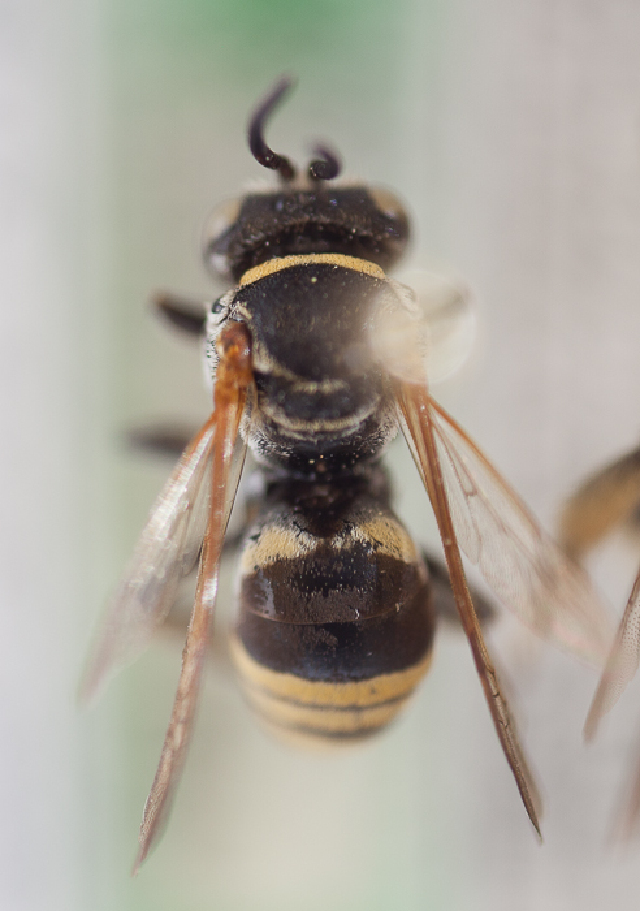

Scientific classification
- Domain: Eukaryota
- Kingdom: Animalia
- Phylum: Arthropoda
- Class: Insecta
- Order: Hymenoptera
- Family: Apidae
- Genus: Triepeolus
- Species: T. mexicanus

Binomial name
- Triepeolus mexicanus (Cresson, 1878)

= Triepeolus mexicanus =

Species of bee

Triepeolus mexicanus is a species of cuckoo bee in the family Apidae. It is found in Central America and North America.
