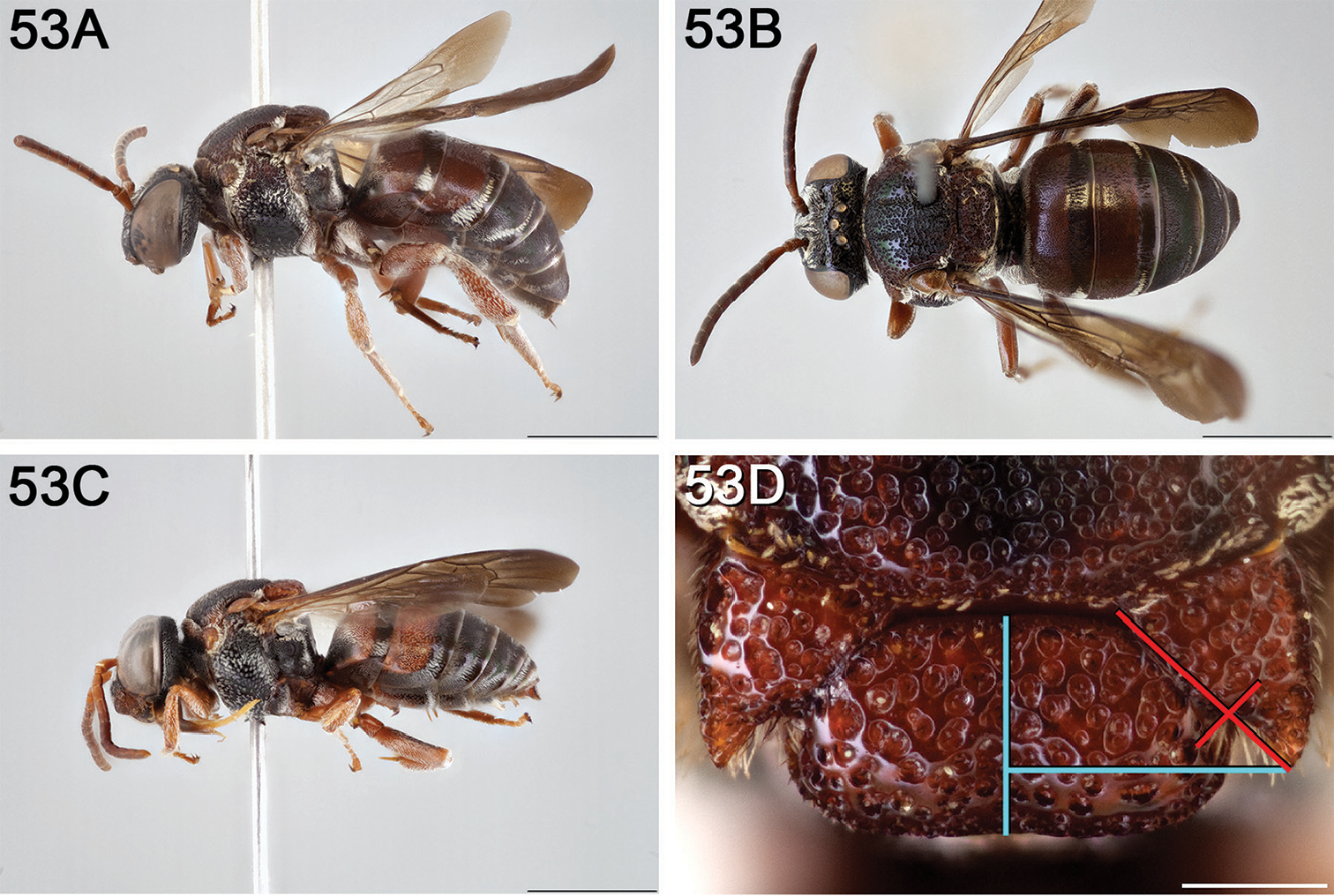

Scientific classification
- Domain: Eukaryota
- Kingdom: Animalia
- Phylum: Arthropoda
- Class: Insecta
- Order: Hymenoptera
- Family: Apidae
- Genus: Epeolus
- Species: E. glabratus

Binomial name
- Epeolus glabratus Cresson, 1878

= Epeolus glabratus =

Species of bee

Epeolus glabratus is a species of cuckoo bee in the family Apidae. It is found in North America.
