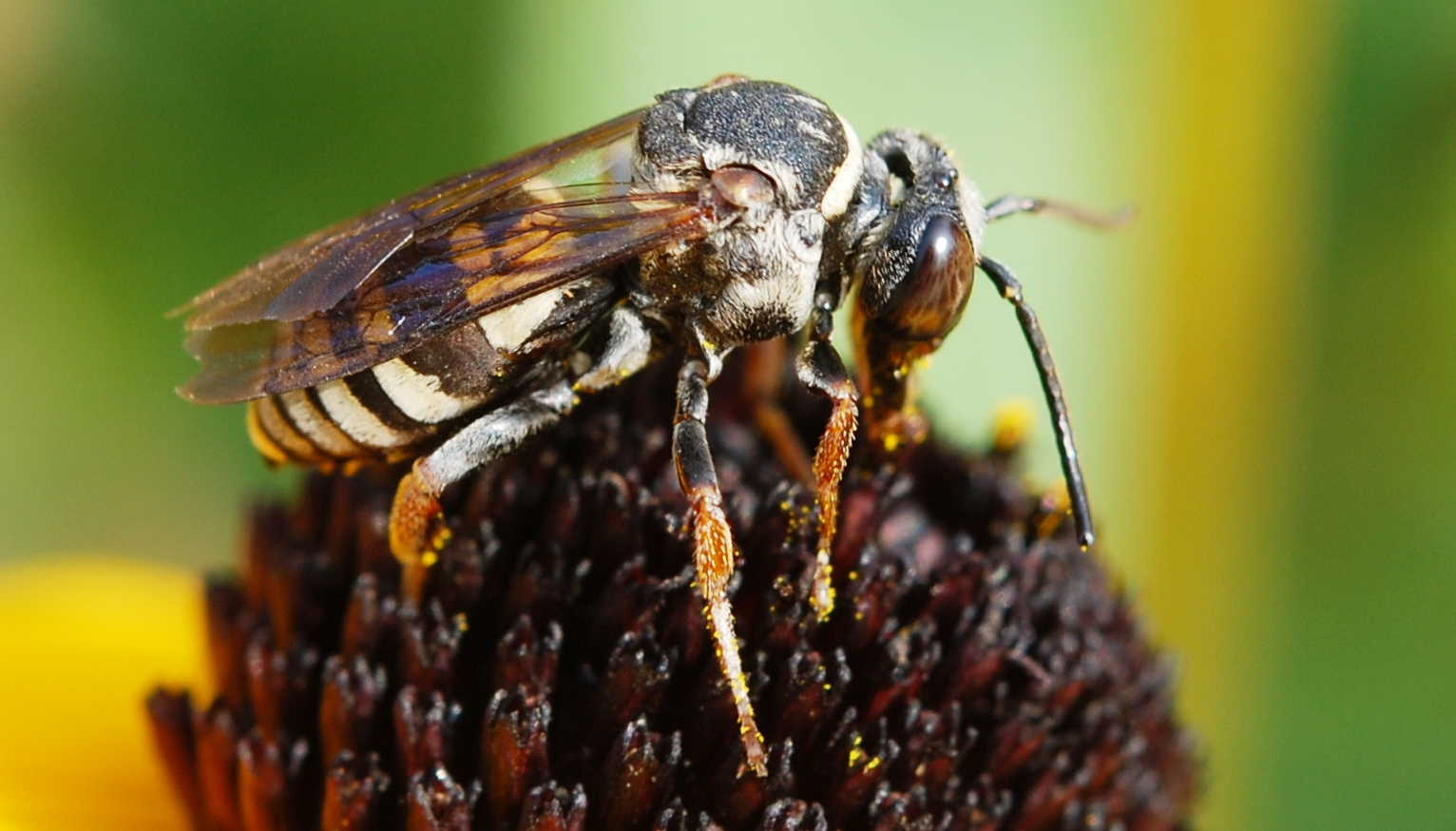

Scientific classification
- Kingdom: Animalia
- Phylum: Arthropoda
- Class: Insecta
- Order: Hymenoptera
- Family: Apidae
- Genus: Triepeolus
- Species: T. lunatus

Binomial name
- Triepeolus lunatus (Say, 1824)

Synonyms
- Triepeolus lunatus concolor (Robertson, 1898); Triepeolus nautlanus Cockerell, 1904

= Triepeolus lunatus =

Species of bee

Triepeolus lunatus is a species of cuckoo bee in the family Apidae. It is found in North America from Canada to northern Mexico. Triepeolus lunatus tends to live in forest edges and meadows.

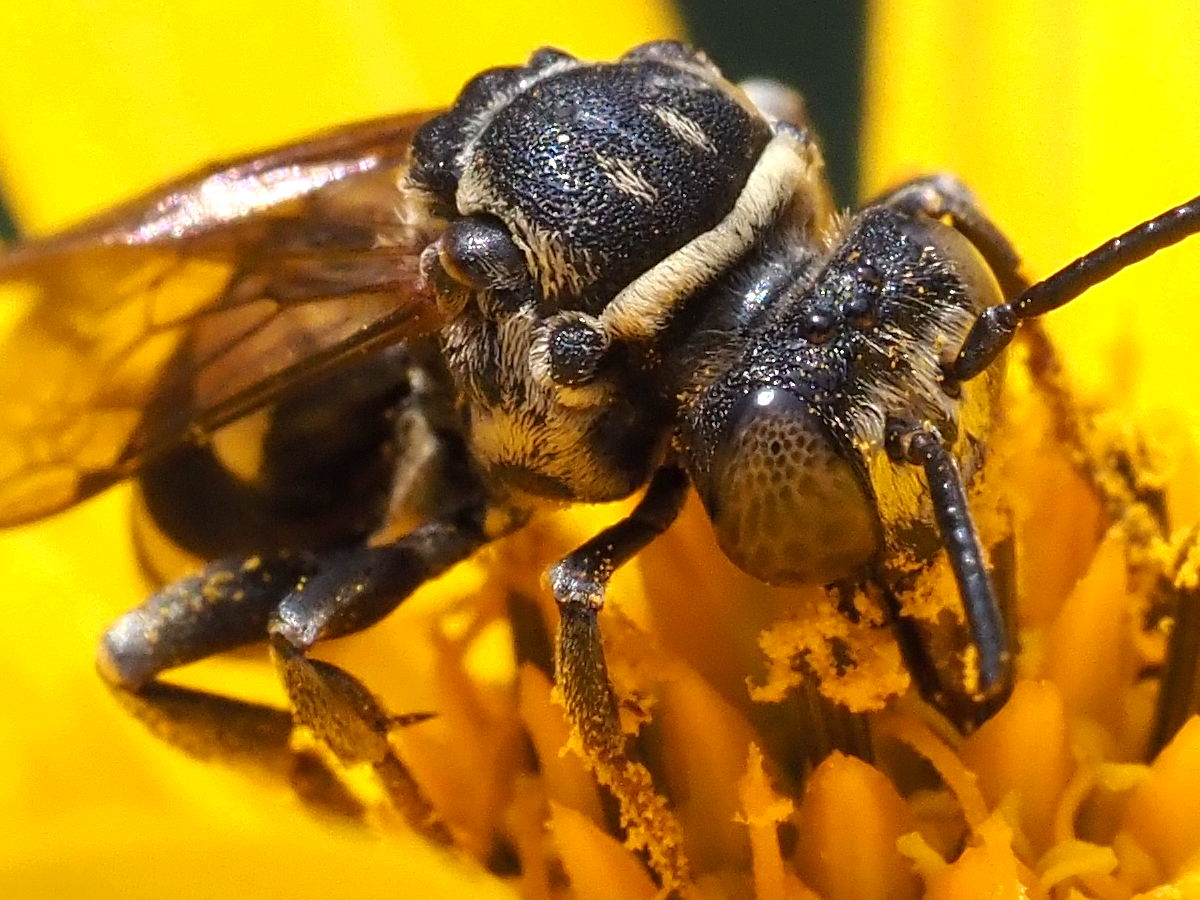
Smiley face pattern on thorax
