= Triepeolus grandis =

Scientific classification
- Domain: Eukaryota
- Kingdom: Animalia
- Phylum: Arthropoda
- Class: Insecta
- Order: Hymenoptera
- Family: Apidae
- Genus: Triepeolus
- Species: T. grandis

Binomial name
- Triepeolus grandis (Friese, 1917)

Species of bee

Triepeolus grandis is a species of cuckoo bees in the family Apidae. It is found in the United States and Mexico.
