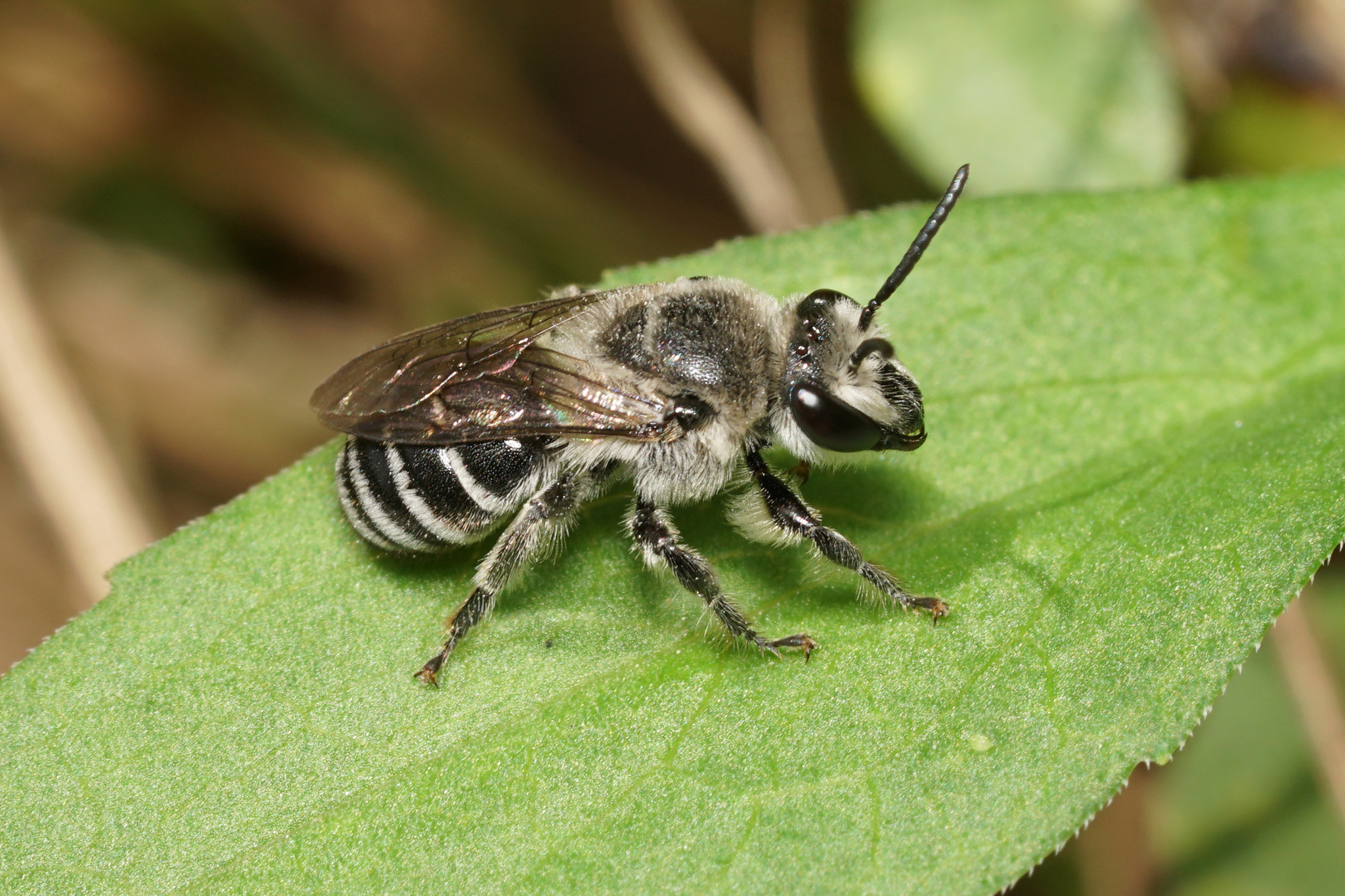

Scientific classification
- Kingdom: Animalia
- Phylum: Arthropoda
- Clade: Pancrustacea
- Class: Insecta
- Order: Hymenoptera
- Family: Colletidae
- Genus: Colletes
- Species: C. latitarsis

Binomial name
- Colletes latitarsis Robertson, 1891

= Colletes latitarsis =

Species of bee

Colletes latitarsis, the broad-footed cellophane bee, is a species of cellophane or plasterer, masked, and fork-tongued bees in the family Colletidae. It is found in North America.
