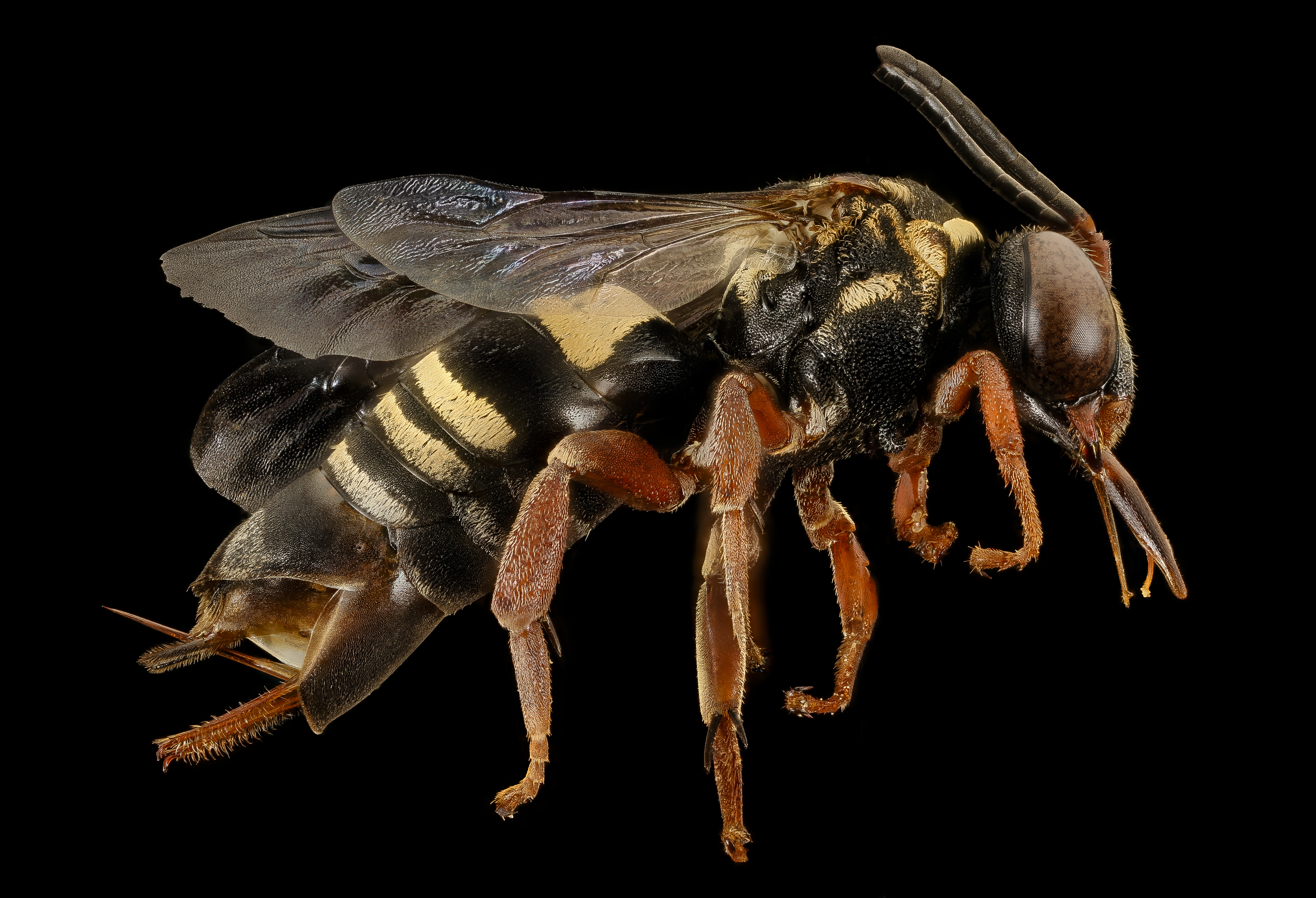
- Triepeolus lunatus female

Scientific classification
- Domain: Eukaryota
- Kingdom: Animalia
- Phylum: Arthropoda
- Class: Insecta
- Order: Hymenoptera
- Family: Apidae
- Subfamily: Nomadinae
- Tribe: Epeolini; Linsley & Michener, 1939

Genera
- See text

= Epeolini =

Tribe of bees

Epeolini is a tribe of cuckoo bees, a tribe of the subfamily Nomadinae.

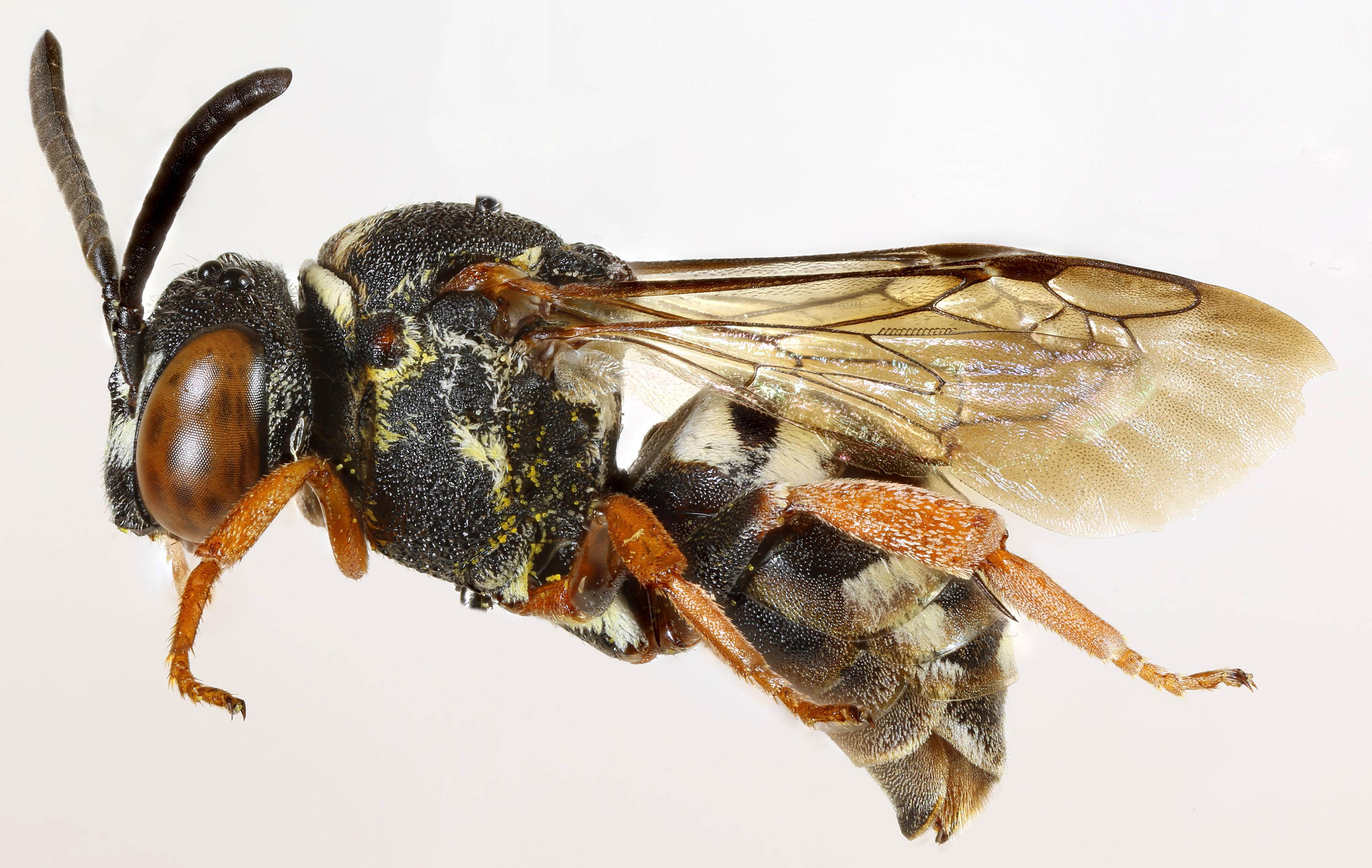
Epeolus variegatus female

== Genera ==
The tribe Epeolini is subdivided as follows:

Subtribe: Odyneropsina
Genus: Odyneropsis

Subtribe: Rhogepeolina
Genus: Rhogepeolus

Subtribe: Epeolina
Genus: Epeolus

Subtribe: Thalestriina
Genus: Doeringiella
Genus: Pseudepeolus
Genus: Triepeolus
Genus: Rhinepeolus
Genus: Thalestria
