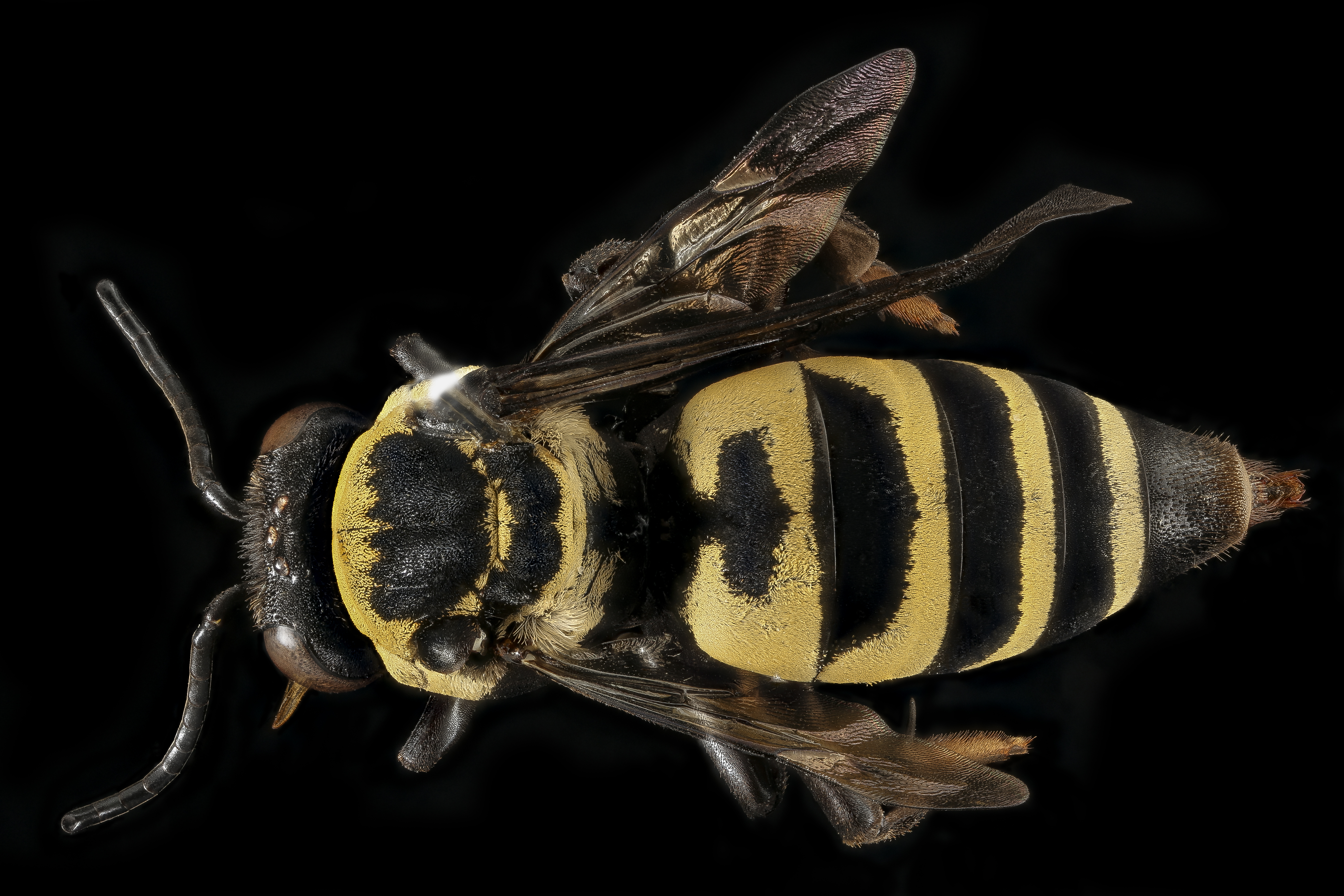
- Triepeolus concavus

Scientific classification
- Kingdom: Animalia
- Phylum: Arthropoda
- Class: Insecta
- Order: Hymenoptera
- Family: Apidae
- Subfamily: Nomadinae
- Tribe: Epeolini
- Subtribe: Thalestriina
- Genus: Triepeolus; Robertson, 1901

= Triepeolus =

Genus of bees

Triepeolus is a genus of cuckoo bees in the family Apidae. There are at least 140 described species in the genus Triepeolus. The majority of species whose life history is known are kleptoparasitic in the nests of bees in the tribe Eucerini, especially the genera Melissodes and Svastra.

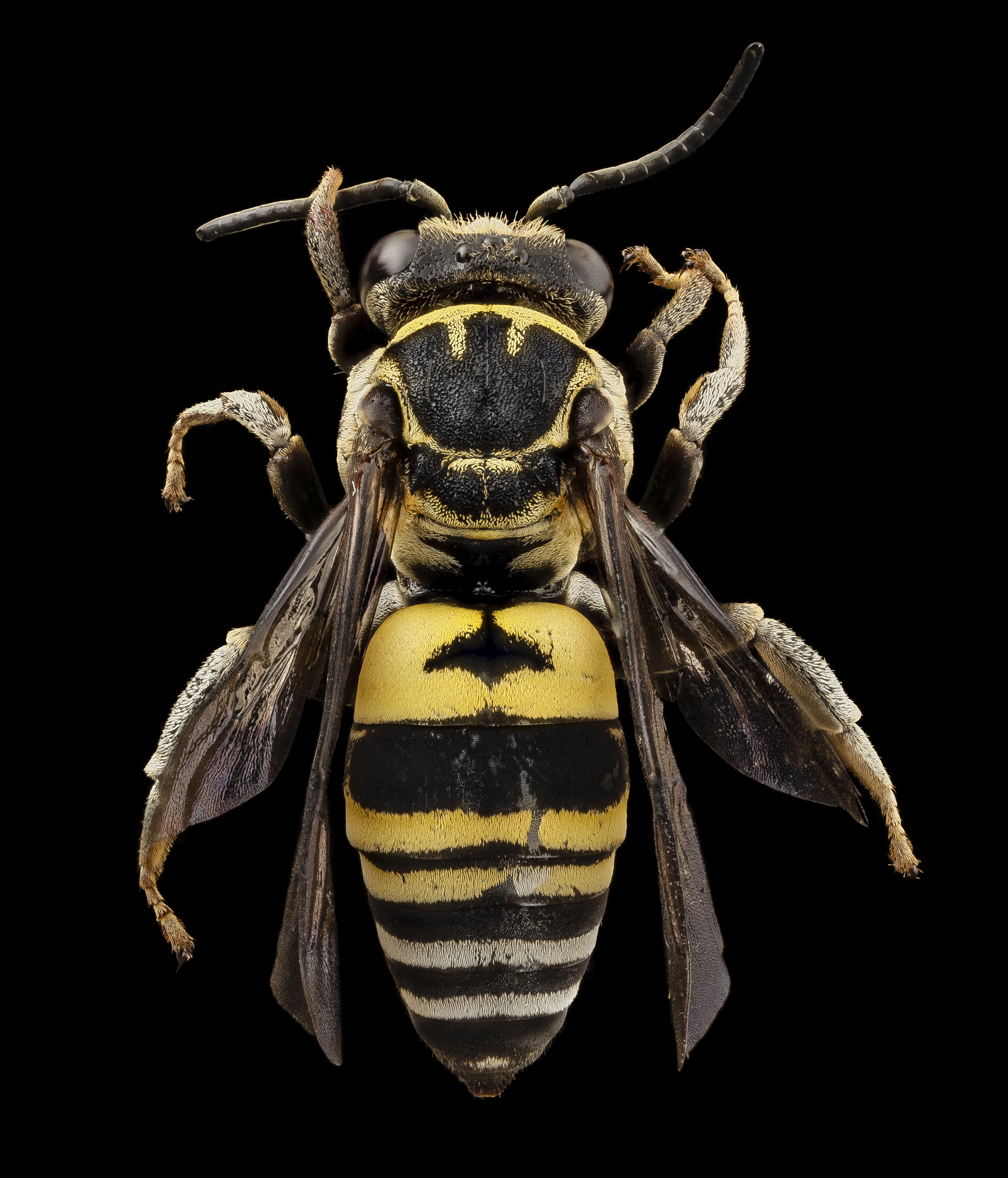
Triepeolus simplex

== See also ==
- List of Triepeolus species
