= Cuckoo bee =

Kleptoparasitic bee lineages

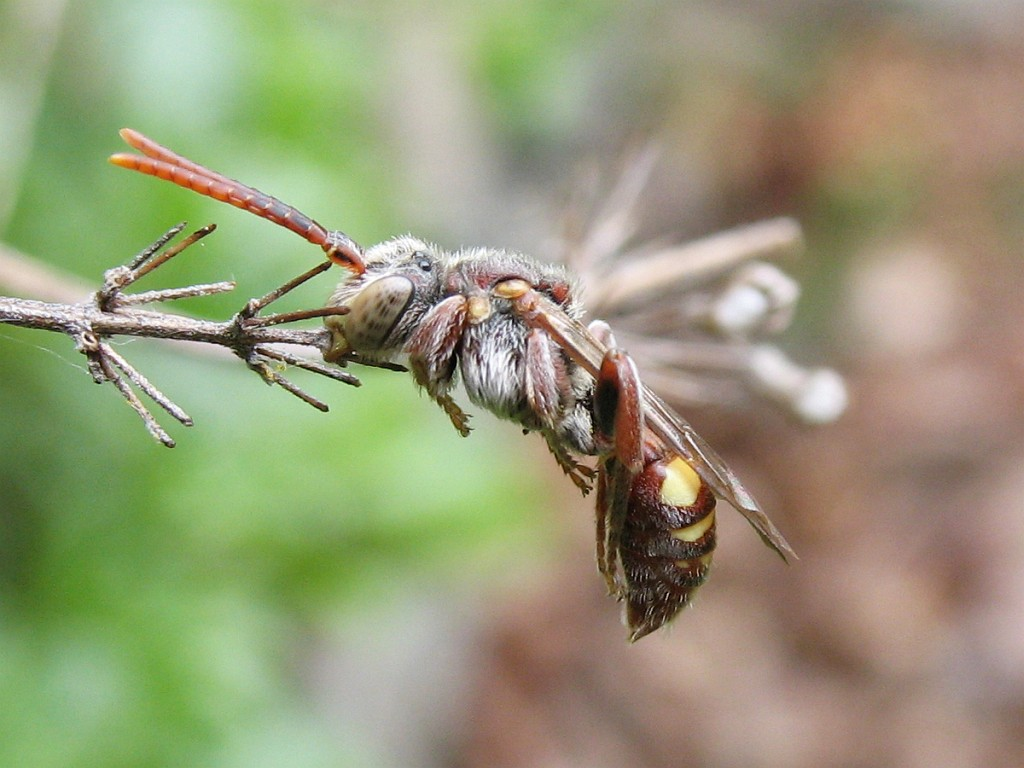
A cuckoo bee from the genus Nomada, sleeping (note the characteristic position anchored by the mandibles).

The term cuckoo bee is used for a variety of different bee lineages which have evolved the kleptoparasitic behaviour of laying their eggs in the nests of other bees, reminiscent of the behavior of cuckoo birds. The name is perhaps best applied to the apid subfamily Nomadinae, but is sometimes used in Europe to mean bumblebees (Bombus) in the subgenus Psithyrus. Females of cuckoo bees are easy to recognize in almost all cases, as they lack pollen-collecting structures (the scopa) and do not construct their own nests. They often have reduced body hair, abnormally thick and/or heavily sculptured exoskeleton, and saber-like mandibles, although this is not universally true; other less visible changes are also common.

The number of times kleptoparasitic behavior has independently evolved within the bees is remarkable; Charles Duncan Michener (2000) lists 16 lineages in which parasitism of social species has evolved (mostly in the family Apidae), and 31 lineages that parasitize solitary hosts (mostly in Apidae, Megachilidae, and Halictidae), collectively representing several thousand species, and therefore a very large proportion of overall bee diversity. There are no cuckoo bees in the families Andrenidae, Melittidae, or Stenotritidae, and possibly the Colletidae (there are only unconfirmed suspicions that one group of Hawaiian Hylaeus species may be parasitic).

Cuckoo bees typically enter the nests of pollen-collecting species, and lay their eggs in cells provisioned by the host bee. When the cuckoo bee larva hatches it consumes the host larva's pollen ball, and, if the female kleptoparasite has not already done so, kills and eats the host larva. In a few cases in which the hosts are social species (e.g., the subgenus Psithyrus of the genus Bombus, which are parasitic bumble bees, and infiltrate nests of non-parasitic species of Bombus), the kleptoparasite remains in the host nest and lays many eggs, sometimes even killing the host queen and replacing her – such species are often called "social parasites", although a few of them are also what are referred to as "brood parasites."

Many cuckoo bees are closely related to their hosts, and may bear similarities in appearance reflecting this relationship. This common pattern gave rise to the ecological principle known as "Emery’s Rule". Others parasitize bees in families different from their own, like Townsendiella, a nomadine apid, one species of which is a kleptoparasite of the melittid genus Hesperapis, whereas the other species in the same genus attack halictid bees.
