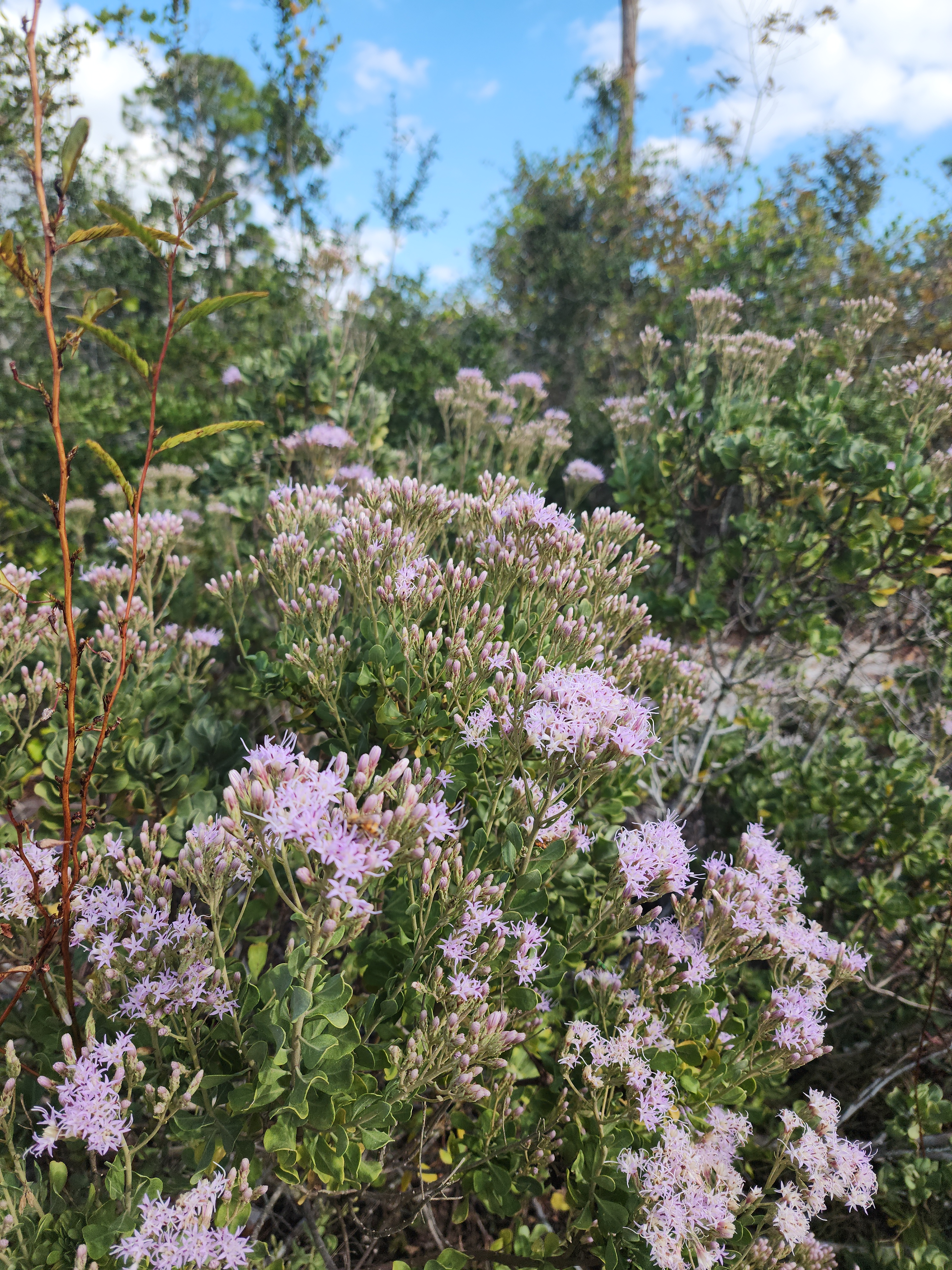

Conservation status
- Vulnerable (NatureServe)

Scientific classification
- Kingdom: Plantae
- Clade: Tracheophytes
- Clade: Angiosperms
- Clade: Eudicots
- Clade: Asterids
- Order: Asterales
- Family: Asteraceae
- Subfamily: Asteroideae
- Tribe: Eupatorieae
- Genus: Garberia; A.Gray
- Species: G. heterophylla

Binomial name
- Garberia heterophylla (Bartram) Merr. & F.Harper

Synonyms
- Cacalia heterophylla Garberia fruticosa Leptoclinium fruticosum Liatris fruticosa

= Garberia =

Genus of flowering plants

Garberia is a monotypic genus of flowering plants in the family Asteraceae, containing the single species Garberia heterophylla. It is endemic to Florida in the United States, where it is distributed in the northern and central counties. The plant is known commonly as garberia and Garber's scrub starts.

== Description ==
This species is a shrub growing about 1 to 2.5 meters tall, with erect, branching stems. The branches are glandular and powdery or lightly hairy in texture when new, and grooved when dry. In a young plant leaves near the base of the stem may be oppositely arranged, but at maturity the branches are mostly lined with alternate leaves. The gray-green blades are glandular, and sticky to powdery when new. They are up to 3.5 centimeters long. The cylindrical flower heads are up to about half a centimeter wide and are borne in open inflorescences. Each head usually contains five aromatic pink or purple disc florets up to a centimeter long. The tips expand into five lobes and the narrow to threadlike style branches protrude. The fruit is a rough-textured, ribbed cypsela with a pappus of many bristles. The fruits remain on the plant, and their long, brown pappi make the shrub stand out among other plants during the winter. The pappi also allow dispersal of the seeds on the wind.

== Taxonomy ==
The genus Garberia was named by Asa Gray in honour of American botanist Abram Paschal Garber.

== Ecology ==
This plant occurs in the Florida scrub and related habitat types, including flatwoods, coastal dunes, and ridges, hills and prairie alongside oaks and pines such as sand pine. It grows in dry, sandy soils low in organic matter. It may flower almost year-round, but its main flowering season is fall.

Garberia provides nectar for many native bees, including Agapostemon splendens, Anthidiellum notatum, Augochlora pura, Augochlorella aurata, Augochloropsis metallica, Bombus impatiens, Coelioxys mexicana, Coelioxys sayi, Colletes mandibularis, Dialictus miniatulus, Dialictus nymphalis, Dialictus placidensis, Epeolus carolinus, Megachile mendica, Megachile pruina, Megachile xylocopoides, and Xylocopa virginica.

== Classification ==
Garberia is in the tribe Eupatorieae of the aster family. Like other members of this tribe, the flower heads have disc florets and no ray florets. It is also in the subtribe Liatrinae along with, for example, Carphephorus. Garberia is closely related to the genus Liatris, but can be distinguished because it is a shrub instead of an herbaceous perennial and has a different karyotype.
