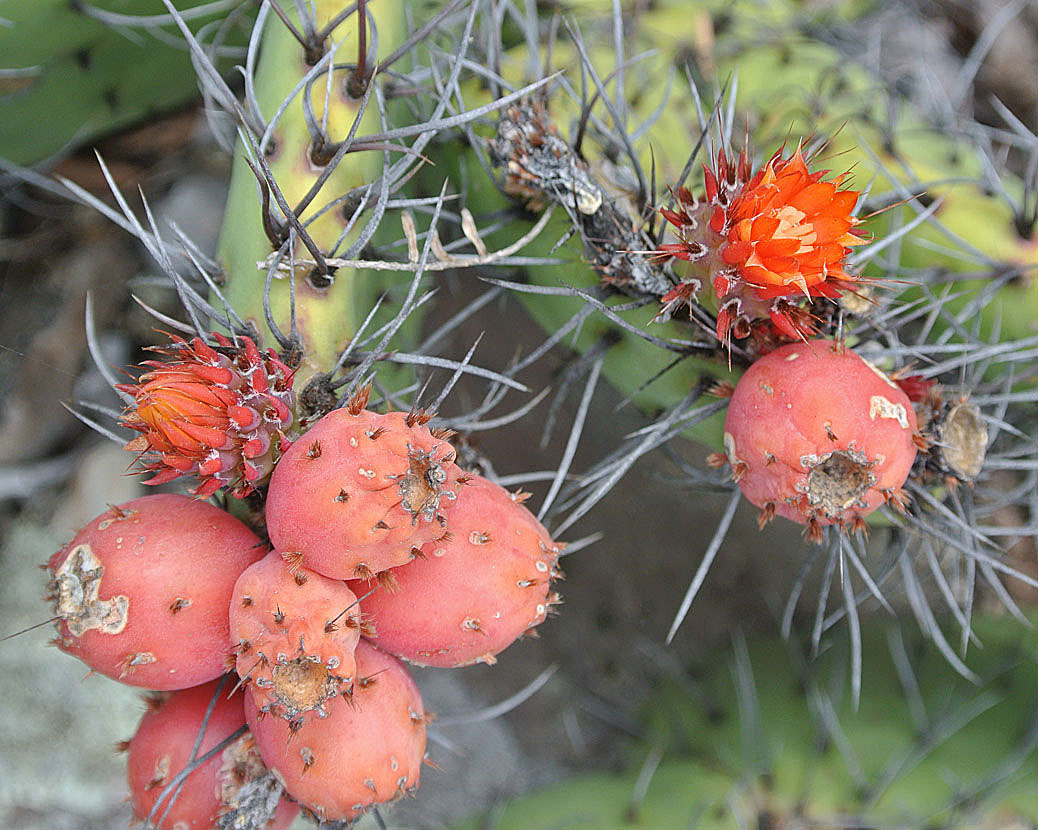

Conservation status
- Least Concern (IUCN 3.1)

Scientific classification
- Kingdom: Plantae
- Clade: Tracheophytes
- Clade: Angiosperms
- Clade: Eudicots
- Order: Caryophyllales
- Family: Cactaceae
- Subfamily: Opuntioideae
- Tribe: Opuntieae
- Genus: Opuntia
- Species: O. stenopetala

Binomial name
- Opuntia stenopetala Engelm. 1856

Synonyms
- List: Opuntia arrastradillo Backeb.; Opuntia glaucescens Link & Otto ex Salm-Dyck; Opuntia glaucescens Pfeiff.; Opuntia grandis Pfeiff.; Opuntia marnieriana Backeb.; Opuntia riviereana Backeb.; Opuntia stenopetala var. inerme Bravo

= Opuntia stenopetala =

Species of cactus

Opuntia stenopetala is a species of cactus native to Mexico. It has no English name, though often the Spanish Tuna Colorada or Nopal Serrano are used. With flat stem-segments, it is one of the many prickly pear cacti belonging to the Cactus Family, the Cactaceae.

== Description ==
The prickly pear cacti often are hard to identify to species level, especially because they hybridze. However, Opuntia stenopetala presents the following combination of features which make it one of the more distinctive species:

- Its growth form can vary from bushy to having elongated, segmented branches creep and rest on the ground.
- Stem segments -- variously called "pads", "joints," "cladodes" or phylloclades -- are up to 20 cm (7 7/8 in) long, round to widest above the middle, grayish green to sometimes purplish, and often very spiny. Images on this page show young pads bearing small, cone-shaped, bright red objects, which are vestigial leaves, the remains of the regular leaves of early cactus ancestors; these fall off as the pads enlarge and mature.
- Clusters of 2-4 spines arise from each areole, which may position themselves up to 3 cm (1 1/8 in) apart. Often lower areoles develop no spines, but produce white, woolly hairs when young. Spines may reach up to 5 cm (2 in) long, the larger ones being somewhat flattened. Usually they are reddish brown to black, but with age become pale, even white. At spine bases there are much shorter, thinner spines, glochids, many of them appearing on young pads but mostly falling away on older ones.
- Flowers are very unusual for prickly pear species because functionally they are either male or female, with each cactus producing only flowers of one sex; the plants are dioecious. Also they are unusually small, being only 3 cm (1 1/8 in) long, including the ovary. Moreover, their orange-red tepals, up to 12 mm (1/2 in) long, are exceptionally narrow, and tapering gradually to a pointed tip. Female flowers have very thick styles bearing 8 or 9 yellow stigma lobes; also they have stamens, but functional pollen does not develop. Male flowers have the same features as the female, except that the stigma lobes are atrophied and terminate as sharp, rigid tips. In such flowers no viable seeds are produced.
- Fruits are spherical, 3 cm (1 1/8 in) in diameter, with or without spines, and acid to the taste.

With regard to the small, dioecious flowers of Opuntia stenopetala, it is worth noting that of the 186 species of the genus Opuntia accepted in 2026, only four species were known to be dioecious. Any kind of dioecy is uncommon in the entire Cactus Family.

== Distribution ==
Opuntia stenopetala is endemic just to Mexico. It occurs in the northern and central states of Aguascalientes, Coahuila, Durango, Guanajuato, Hidalgo, Nuevo León, Querétaro, San Luis Potosí, Tamaulipas, Veracruz and Zacatecas.

== Habitat ==
In central Mexico, Opuntia stenopetala occurs in semi-arid areas with scrub vegetation, including in the foothills of the Eastern and Western Sierra Madres.

== Ecology ==
Opuntia stenopetala is pollinated by hummingbirds.

In dry environments of the central Mexican state of Querétaro, among plants considered most important for bee populations, Opuntia stenopetala was considered to be of second-most value. A bee associated with the species is Augochlorella pomoniella.

A study of the desert scrub of Cerro de San Pedro in the Mexican state of San Luis Potosí found that Opuntia stenopetala was important as a forage for animals during period of drought.

== In gardening ==
Opuntia stenopetala is regarded as a distinctive cactus suitable for xeriscaping, rock gardens and as a specimen plant in undertakings with a desert-like theme. It thrives in full sunlight, needs little water once established, and overall is low maintenance. It is generally pest-resistant, but can be susceptible to cochineal scale insects. Of course its sharp spines should be considered during placement.

== Taxonomy ==
=== Historical background ===
In 1856 when George Engelmann formally described and named Opuntia stenopetala, he remarked that his plant was collected "On the battle-field of Buena Vista, south of Saltillo." That battlefield was the site of the 1847 Battle of Buenavista during the Mexican–American War. Also he described the plant as prostrate, but very similar to Opuntia grandis, which grew upright. Later the name Opuntia grandis was determined to be synonymous with Opuntia stenopetala. Most likely the type specimen described by Engelmann was sent to him by Josiah Gregg, who supplied Engelmann with 600 specimens from Mexico, and who had been present at the Battle of Buena Vista.

=== Phylogeny ===
Phylogenetic analysis based on morphological traits found Opuntia stenopetala to form a clade with these three other taxa: Opuntia microdasys, Opuntia rufida and Opuntia x carsteni. The latter is a hybrid between O. stenopetala and O. microdasys.

=== Etymology ===
The origin of the genus name Opuntia is uncertain, though possibly it was based on the name of a Greek town where a cactus-like plant grew.

The species name stenopetala is derived from the Greek stenos, meaning "narrow, straight", and petalon, meaning petal. Thus "narrow petal," describing the narrow tepals of Opuntia stenopetala.

== Gallery ==
long branches extending across the ground

compact, bush form

red flower buds on pad

red vestigial leaves soon to fall off

old white spines and glochids

small, bushy plant at right of tent, in habitat
