= List of Augochlora species =

This is a list of 118 species in Augochlora, a genus of sweat bees in the family Halictidae.

== Augochlora species ==
- Augochlora albiceps Friese, 1925^{i c g}
- Augochlora albiplantis (Vachal, 1911)^{i c g}
- Augochlora alcyone Smith, 1879^{i c g}
- Augochlora alexanderi Engel, 2003^{i c g}
- Augochlora amphitrite (Schrottky, 1909)^{i c g}
- Augochlora antillana Cockerell, 1910^{i c g}
- Augochlora antonita Michener, 1954^{i c g}
- Augochlora ardens (Vachal, 1911)^{i c g}
- Augochlora aticreis (Vachal, 1911)^{i c g}
- Augochlora atrispinis (Vachal, 1911)^{i c g}
- Augochlora aurifera Cockerell, 1897^{i c g}
- Augochlora aurinasis (Vachal, 1911)^{i c g}
- Augochlora azteca (Vachal, 1911)^{i c g b} (Aztec augochlora)
- Augochlora bodkini Cockerell, 1923^{i c g}
- Augochlora bogotensis (Vachal, 1911)^{i c g}
- Augochlora brachyops (Vachal, 1911)^{i c g}
- Augochlora bractealis (Vachal, 1904)^{i c g}
- Augochlora braziliensis (Vachal, 1911)^{i c g}
- Augochlora buscki Cockerell, 1910^{i c g}
- Augochlora caerulescens Friese, 1921^{i c g}
- Augochlora caerulior Cockerell, 1900^{i c g}
- Augochlora cephalica (Moure, 1941)^{i c g}
- Augochlora chiriquiana Michener, 1954^{i c g}
- Augochlora clarki Michener, 1954^{i c g}
- Augochlora cordiaefloris Cockerell, 1907^{i c g}
- Augochlora cupraria Friese, 1925^{i c g}
- Augochlora cyaneoviridis Ashmead, 1900^{i c g}
- Augochlora cydippe (Schrottky, 1910)^{i c g}
- Augochlora cylix (Vachal, 1911)^{i c g}
- Augochlora cymatoides (Vachal, 1911)^{i c g}
- Augochlora daphnis Smith, 1853^{i c g}
- Augochlora decorata (Smith, 1853)^{i c g}
- Augochlora detudis (Vachal, 1911)^{i c g}
- Augochlora diaphractes (Vachal, 1911)^{i c g}
- Augochlora dolichocephala (Moure, 1941)^{i c g}
- Augochlora dorsualis (Vachal, 1911)^{i c g}
- Augochlora ectasis (Vachal, 1911)^{i c g}
- Augochlora engys (Vachal, 1911)^{i c g}
- Augochlora erubescens Cockerell, 1923^{i c g}
- Augochlora esox (Vachal, 1911)^{i c g}
- Augochlora euryale (Schrottky, 1906)^{i c g}
- Augochlora feronia Smith, 1879^{i c g}
- Augochlora foxiana Cockerell, 1900^{i c g}
- Augochlora francisca Schrottky, 1902^{i c g}
- Augochlora fugax (Vachal, 1904)^{i c g}
- Augochlora fulgidana Friese, 1925^{i c g}
- Augochlora fulvilabris Friese, 1917^{i c g}
- Augochlora glabricollis Friese, 1917^{i c g}
- Augochlora haitiensis (Vachal, 1911)^{i c g}
- Augochlora hallinani Michener, 1954^{i c g}
- Augochlora holti Cockerell, 1927^{i c g}
- Augochlora ignifera Crawford, 1914^{i c g}
- Augochlora igniventris (Vachal, 1911)^{i c g}
- Augochlora iheringi Cockerell, 1900^{i c g}
- Augochlora isthmii Schwarz, 1934^{i c g}
- Augochlora jamaicana Cockerell, 1909^{i c g}
- Augochlora jugalis (Vachal, 1911)^{i c g}
- Augochlora labrosa (Say, 1837)^{i c g}
- Augochlora laevipyga (Kirby, 1890)^{i c g}
- Augochlora laneifrons (Vachal, 1911)^{i c g}
- Augochlora leprieuri (Spinola, 1841)^{i c g}
- Augochlora leptis (Vachal, 1911)^{i c g}
- Augochlora lethe (Schrottky, 1909)^{i c g}
- Augochlora liapsis (Vachal, 1911)^{i c g}
- Augochlora lorenzinis Strand, 1910^{i c g}
- Augochlora lyoni Cockerell, 1918^{i c g}
- Augochlora magnifica Cresson, 1865^{i c g}
- Augochlora matucanensis Cockerell, 1914^{i c g}
- Augochlora micans (Moure, 1940)^{i c g}
- Augochlora microchlorina Cockerell, 1949^{i c g}
- Augochlora microsticta Moure, 1943^{i c g}
- Augochlora morrae Strand, 1910^{i c g}
- Augochlora mourei Michener, 1954^{i c g}
- Augochlora mulleri Cockerell, 1900^{i c g}
- Augochlora nausicaa (Schrottky, 1909)^{i c g}
- Augochlora neivai (Moure, 1940)^{i c g}
- Augochlora neottis (Vachal, 1911)^{i c g}
- Augochlora nigrocyanea Cockerell, 1897^{i c g}
- Augochlora nominata Michener, 1954^{i c g}
- Augochlora notialis (Vachal, 1904)^{i c g}
- Augochlora obscuriceps Friese, 1925^{i c g}
- Augochlora oedesis (Vachal, 1911)^{i c g}
- Augochlora pachytes (Vachal, 1911)^{i c g}
- Augochlora patruelis (Vachal, 1911)^{i c g}
- Augochlora perimelas Cockerell, 1900^{i c g}
- Augochlora phanerorhina Cockerell, 1930^{i c g}
- Augochlora phoemonoe (Schrottky, 1909)^{i c g}
- Augochlora phoenicis (Vachal, 1911)^{i c g}
- Augochlora pinacis (Vachal, 1911)^{i c g}
- Augochlora plutax (Vachal, 1911)^{i c g}
- Augochlora posadensis (Schrottky, 1914)^{i c g}
- Augochlora praeclara Cresson, 1865^{i c g}
- Augochlora punctibasis (Vachal, 1911)^{i c g}
- Augochlora pura (Say, 1837)^{i c g b} (pure green augochlora)
- Augochlora pyrgo (Schrottky, 1910)^{i c g}
- Augochlora pyrrhias (Vachal, 1911)^{i c g}
- Augochlora quiriguensis Cockerell, 1913^{i c g}
- Augochlora regina Smith, 1853^{i c g}
- Augochlora repandirostris (Vachal, 1911)^{i c g}
- Augochlora rightmyerae Engel, 2000^{i c g}
- Augochlora rohdei (Vachal, 1911)^{i c g}
- Augochlora seitzi Cockerell, 1929^{i c g}
- Augochlora semiramis (Schrottky, 1910)^{i c g}
- Augochlora sidaefoliae Cockerell, 1913^{i c g}
- Augochlora smaragdina Friese, 1917^{i c g}
- Augochlora sphaerites (Vachal, 1911)^{i c g}
- Augochlora sporas (Vachal, 1911)^{i c g}
- Augochlora styx (Schrottky, 1909)^{i c g}
- Augochlora tantilla Moure, 1943^{i c g}
- Augochlora thalia Smith, 1879^{i c g}
- Augochlora thaliana Strand, 1910^{i c g}
- Augochlora thebe (Schrottky, 1909)^{i c g}
- Augochlora thusnelda (Schrottky, 1909)^{i c g}
- Augochlora townsendi Cockerell, 1897^{i c g}
- Augochlora transversalis Sandhouse & Cockerell, 1924^{i c g}
- Augochlora vincentana Cockerell, 1910^{i c g}
- Augochlora viridinitens Cockerell, 1931^{i c g}
- Augochlora xesis (Vachal, 1911)^{i c g}

Data sources: i = ITIS, c = Catalogue of Life, g = GBIF, b = Bugguide.net
