= Abram Paschal Garber =

American botanist (1838–1881)

- Born: January 23, 1838; Floral Retreat farm, Columbia, Pennsylvania, US
- Died: August 25, 1881 (aged 43)
- Other name: Abraham Pascal Garbe
- Occupations: teacher, principal, physician, and botanist

"Dr. Abram P. Garber- a biographical sketch" readable pdf

Abram Paschal Garber (January 23, 1838 – August 25, 1881), also referred to as Abraham Pascal Garber, was a teacher, principal, medical doctor, and botanist from Pennsylvania who collected plants in Florida, the West Indies, and Puerto Rico.

== Biography ==
Garber was born on his families farm "Floral Retreat" near Columbia, Pennsylvania January 23, 1838. His mother was Susanna (née Stauffer) Garber and his father was Jacob B. Garber, who was of German origin whose ancestors made their way to the United States, via Switzerland and The Netherlands, around 1695. He was the third of seven siblings, with two older brothers Henry and John and four younger siblings Mary, Hiram, Jacob and Fanny. While growing up on the farm Garber maintained a greenhouse and wrote articles on horticulture.

He was educated at Millersville Normal School and he also taught in the schools of Lancaster County as well as becoming the principle of Catasauqua Seminary near to Allentown, Pennsylvania. While at Millersville he joined the Linnean Society of Lancaster and remained actively involved until his death.

Garber enlisted with the 195th Pennsylvania Volunteers during the American Civil War and served in both Maryland and West Virginia in 1864.

He then enrolled at Lafayette College to continue his education being attracted to the college by the botanist Thomas Conrad Porter being the professor of botany there. While at the college he joined the Washington Literary Society and he graduated in 1868 from the scientific department. After graduating he was appointed as "Assistant in Natural History" at the college, and he worked in the roll from 1868 until 1870, during which he collected plants from across Pennsylvania including excursions with botanist Thomas Potts James.

Garber enrolled to study medicine under Traill Green at the University of Pennsylvania's School of Medicine and studied there from 1870 until 1872. He suffered from "consumption", a term for tuberculosis used in the 19th century. After graduating he took up the position of Assistant Resident Physician at the Pennsylvania State Lunatic Hospital where he worked until 1875 when his tuberculosis forced him to quit. He continued to work in private practice for a just a few months before deciding to move to the warmer climate of Florida, where he returned to botanical interests and collecting plants both in Florida and other places such as Puerto Rico.

Various plants including the genus Garberia and a herbarium are named for him. Garberia was named after him in recognition for his contributions to the knowledge of the flora of Florida. Other plants include Coccothrinax garberi , Convolvulus garberi, Eugenia garberia, Euphorbia garberi, Fissidens garberi, Habenella garberi, Laciniaria garberi, Salvia occidentalis garberi, Sphagnum garberi and Thrinax garberi. His International Plant Names Index standard form abbreviation is 'Garber'.

He returned to his home in Lancaster County, Pennsylvania June 1881 and he died August 25, 1881, on the way back home after a trip to the mountains of north-central Pennsylvania. He was buried in the family graveyard in Forrey Graveyard, West Hempfield Township, Lancaster County.
