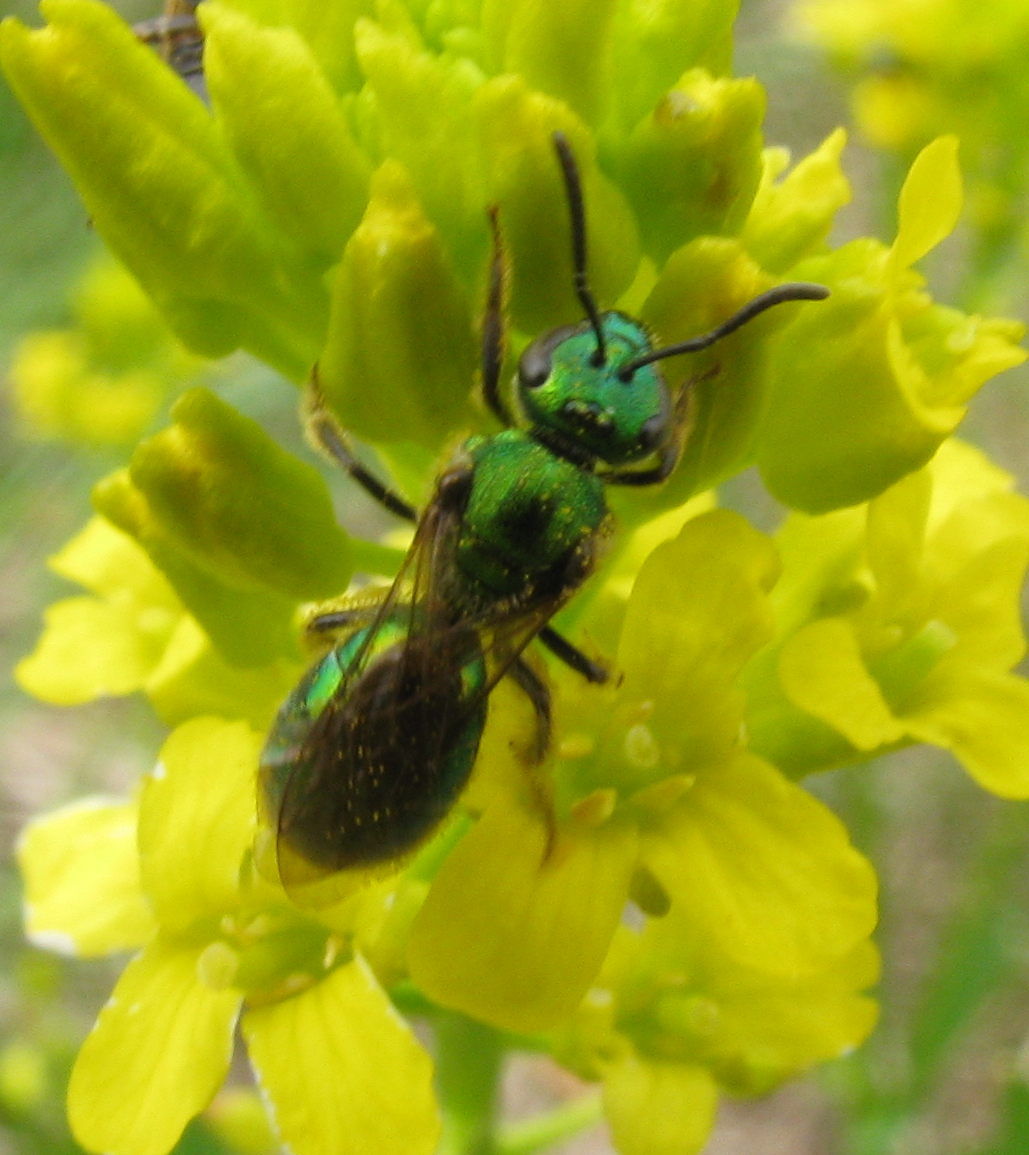

Scientific classification
- Kingdom: Animalia
- Phylum: Arthropoda
- Class: Insecta
- Order: Hymenoptera
- Family: Halictidae
- Tribe: Augochlorini
- Genus: Augochlorella
- Species: A. aurata

Binomial name
- Augochlorella aurata (Smith, 1853)

Synonyms
- Augochlorella striata (Provancher)

= Augochlorella aurata =

Species of insect

Augochlorella aurata is a primitively eusocial species of sweat bee (bees attracted by the salt in human sweat) in the family Halictidae. It is one of three species of Augochlorella found east of the Rocky Mountains in North America. The body is a brilliant green metallic color, diffused to varying extents with a copper, red, or yellow color. A. aurata is a generalist pollen feeder and likely an important pollinator for some horticultural crops. A common name is golden green sweat bee.

== Description and identification ==
Augochlorella aurata are usually a golden green color but can range from a metallic blue to a coppery pink. Both males and females of Augochlorella aurata are around 5-7mm with females usually slightly larger than males. Like many bees, the females have 10 antennal segments and the males have 11.

Augochlorella aurata have a few specific characteristics that define them from other bees with similar appearance. Like many members of Halictidae, the tip of the mandible of these bees is rounded and said to be shaped like a glove or mitten. This character distinguishes them from Augochlora pura that bears similar resemblance but have forked mandible tips. The propodeum is relatively uniform, with no ridge, separating it from bees in a closely related genus, Agapostemon.

The hind tibial spur is simple or slightly serrated, distinguishing it from the genus Augochloropsis. To distinguish Augochlorini bees from other Halictidae bees, Augochlorini females have abdominal T5 segment with a medial slit that originates on the rim and is at least a third of the longitudinal length of the segment.

Additionally, the marginal cell of the forewing is pointed in Augochlorella aurata and squared off in Augochlora pura.

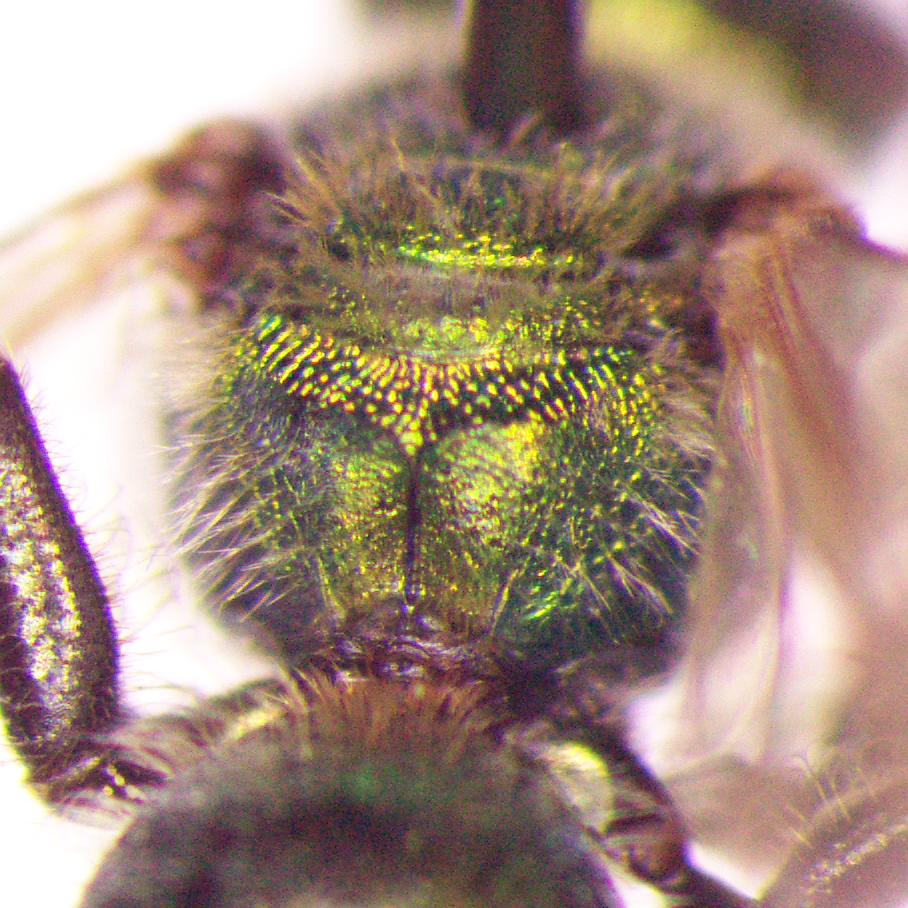
Augochlorella aurata uncircled propodeum

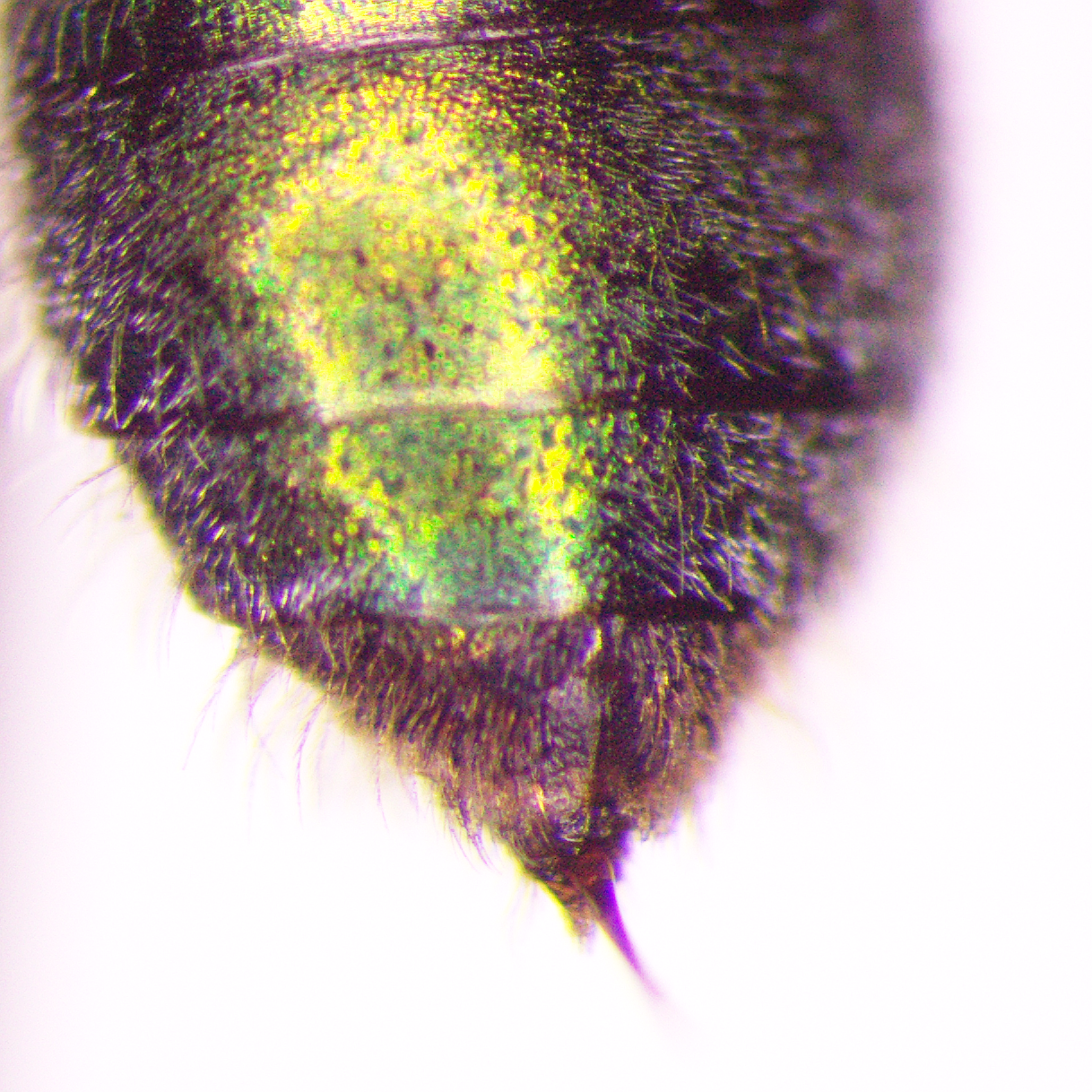
T5 longitudinal medial slit on female Augochlorella aurata

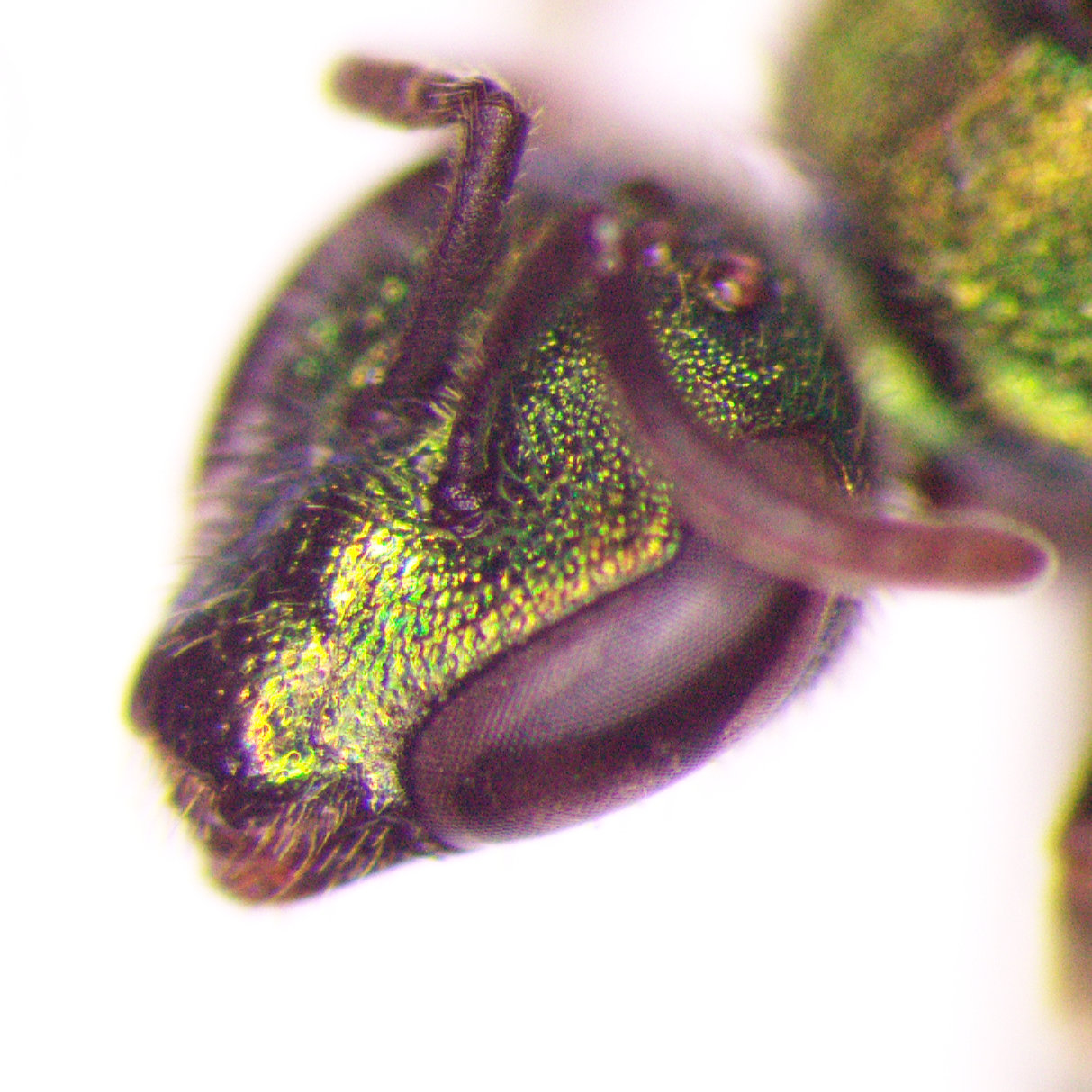
Rounded mandible tip on Augochlorella aurata

== Distribution and habitat ==
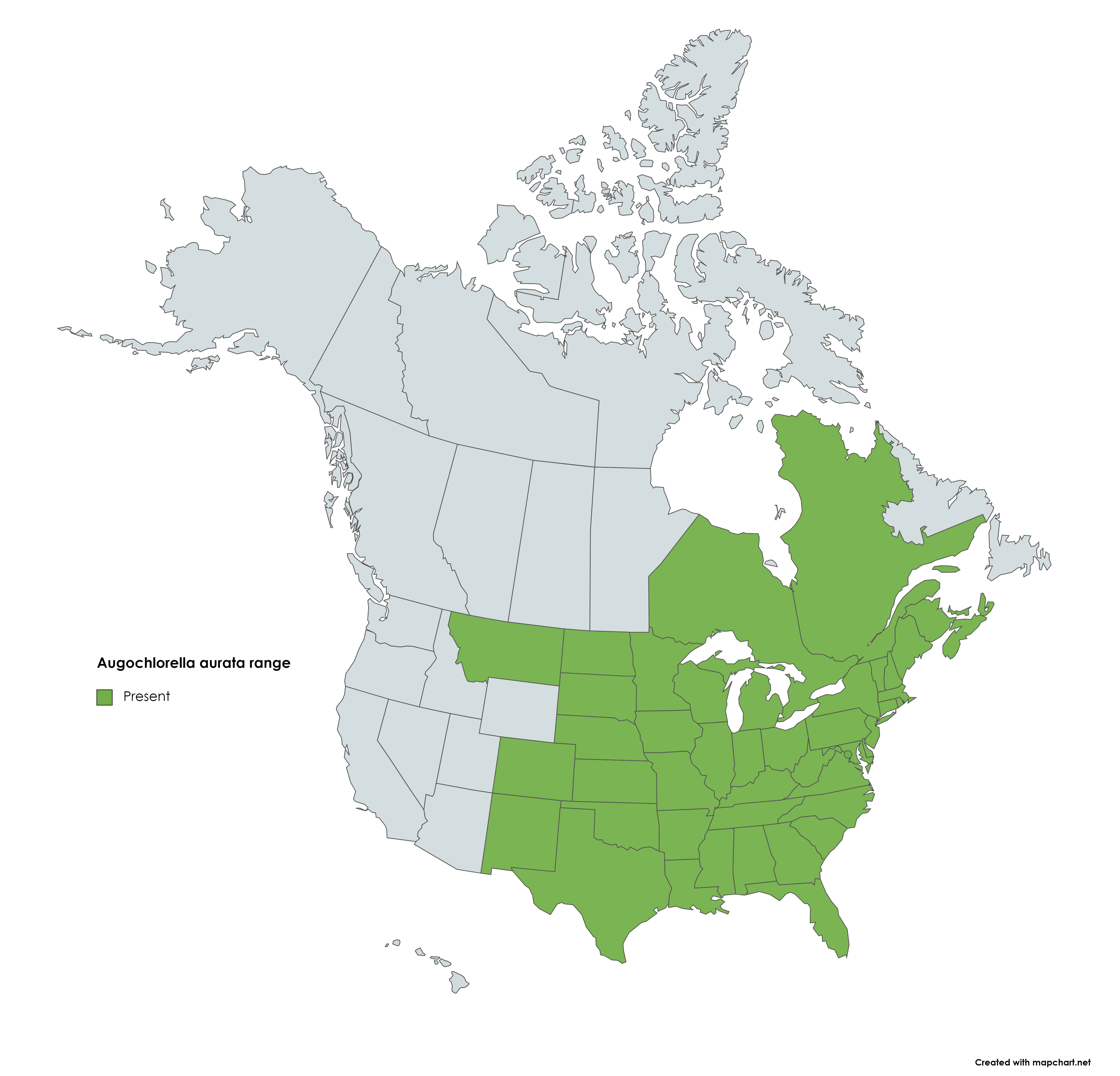
Augochlorella aurata distribution

Augochlorella aurata is found throughout the United States, clustering mostly around the east coast and spreading westward. Specifically, this species is found from Southern Canada south to Florida and west to Colorado and Texas. There have been sparse occurrences of A. aurata as west as California and as south as South America. A. aurata inhabits the range furthest north in the Augochlorini tribe which is primarily distributed in the Neotropical region.

== Taxonomy and phylogeny ==
Augochlorella aurata is a bee within the family Halictidae, in which 4 subfamilies, 81 genera, and over 4,000 species are currently described. It is within the monophyletic tribe Augochlorini and within the monophyletic clade Augochlora which is composed of the four genera Augochlora (Smith), Augochlorella (Sandhouse), Ceratalictus (Moure), and Pereirapis (Moure) amounting to 150 species total. Augochlorella contains 19 species and is sister to Augochlora.

The tribe Augochlorini has eight described fossil species from Dominican amber and date back to the Early Miocene, estimated to be 20.44 to 30.82 million years ago.

== Colony cycle ==
Augochlorella aurata is a primitively eusocial ground nesting bee. The colony season begins in spring with a foundress phase in which the overwintered female bee create a nest in the soil and will start a first brood of both males and females. The worker phase begins in early summer when the first brood emerges. The first-brood females become non-reproductively active workers, and the foundress stops all foraging to become the primary reproductive or the queen. In the reproductive phase, workers assist the queen in raising a second brood of both reproductive male and females towards the end of summer. The second brood will then mate in early fall, and the inseminated females overwinter to emerge the next spring as new foundresses. The average number of offspring produced per nest is about 14 to 15 individuals. Although most A. aurata will roughly stick to this colony cycle, some studies show occasional exceptions with some individuals going through the worker phase more than once or becoming completely solitary.

== Foraging and pollination ==
Augochlorella aurata is a polylectic forager meaning they visit many different plant species to collect pollen for feeding. Generally, Augochlorella sp. have been observed visiting a variety of horticulturally significant crops including apple, blueberry, cantaloupe, coffee, cranberry, pepper, tomato, and watermelon. Specifically, A. aurata have been formally observed visiting plants including tomato, Echinacea, and strawberry though they likely visit many more plants due to their generalist pollen feeding habit.
