= Francis Harper (biologist) =

American naturalist

- Born: November 17, 1886; Southbridge, Massachusetts
- Died: November 17, 1972 (Aged 86); Chapel Hill, North Carolina
- Citizenship: United States
- Education: Cornell University
- Scientific career
- Author abbrev. (botany): F. Harper

Notes
- The botanist Roland McMillan Harper is Francis' brother.

Francis Harper (17 November 1886 – 17 November 1972) was an American naturalist known for the study of the 18th-century American naturalists John and William Bartram. His research included studies of the Okefenokee Swamp and fieldwork in the north eastern United States and in northern Canada, and authored new combinations for two species originally described by William Bartram, Garberia heterophylla and Roystonea elata.

== Biography ==
Harper received an A.B. in 1914 and a Ph.D. in 1925 from Cornell University. He taught briefly at Swarthmore College, but beyond that he worked for museums, government agencies and research agencies.

In 1914 Harper made his first trip to northern Canada on an expedition to Lake Athabasca working as a zoologist for the Geological Survey of Canada.

Between 1917 and 1919 Harper served as a rodent control officer in France with the United States Army's 79th Division. He returned to Athabasca in 1920, Nueltin Lake in the southern District of Keewatin (Keewatin / Kivalliq) in 1947 and the Ungava Peninsula in 1953, his last trip north. Harper published notable works on the caribou of Keewatin, the birds of the Ungava Peninsula, and the Innu (Montagnais) of the Ungava.

== Research ==
From 1917 through the 1950s Harper spent significant time researching the work of the early North American naturalists John Bartram and his son William Bartram. Harper traced the Bartrams' travels in the American South and helped revive both scientific and popular interest in the Bartrams' work, while keeping notebooks on his fieldworks as early as in 1912. Harper's research into the Bartrams was funded by grants from the John Bartram Association in Philadelphia, the American Philosophical Society, and the Guggenheim Foundation among others.

Extensive publications on both of the Bartrams included annotated editions of John Bartram's "Diary of a Journey through the Carolinas, Georgia, and Florida 1765-1766"; William Bartram's "Report to Dr. John Fothergill 1773-1774" and an annotated The Travels of William Bartram: Naturalist’s Edition first published in Philadelphia in 1791.

Harper published on the mammals and folklore of the Okefenokee Swamp, including recordings of the local music. He also published on the "extinct and vanishing" mammals of the old world. His papers are held in the Kenneth Spencer Research Library at the University of Kansas.

== Publications ==
Harper authored about 135 publications including:

- "The Vultur Sacra of William Bartram", written by William Bartram, edited by F. Harper. (Note: Reprinted from "The Auk," vol. LIII, October 1936.) Swarthmore, Pa, 1936? OCLC 898176374, ISSN 0004-8038
- "The Bartram trail through the southeastern states", (Note: Reprinted from the "Bulletin of the Garden Club of America", September, 1939.) Chicago, 1939. OCLC 6248679
- "Some works of Bartram, Daudin, Latreille, and Sonnini, and their bearing upon North American herpetological nomenclature", (Note: Reprinted from the American Midland Naturalist, v. 23, no. 3, May, 1940.) Notre Dame: Indiana University Press, 1940.OCLC 6588855
- "William Bartram's names of birds", (Note: Reprinted from the "Proceedings of the Rochester Academy of Science" 8: pp.208–221, September 10, 1942.) Rochester: 1942? OCLC 977478068
- "John Bartram's Diary; and William Bartram's Travels, edited by F. Harper, "Transactions of American Philosophy Society", n.s., 33 (1-2), Philadelphia: APS, 1944. (Note: Bound in one volume with extra title page. See also the bibliographical note in Brothers of the spade: Correspondence of Peter Collinson, of London, and of John Curtis, of Williamsberg, Virginia, 1734–1746 by Swem, E.G., in "Proceedings of American Antiquarian Society", volume 58, part 1. (Apr. 1948) on this work.) OCLC 84528141
- "Diary of a Journey through the Carolinas, Georgia, and Florida, from July 1, 1765 to April 10, 1766" edited by F. Harper.
- "Travels in Georgia and Florida, 1773-74. A Report to Dr. John Fothergill" edited by Francis Harper.
- The Travels of William Bartram: Naturalist’s Edition, edited by Francis Harper, University of Georgia Press: (30 September 1998), ISBN 0-8203-2027-7. (Note: Originally published by Yale University Press: in 1958.)

== Bibliography ==
- n.s. (December 1942). Transactions of the American Philosophical Society, part 1. Vol. 33. pp. 1–122.
- Manville, Richard H (1959). "Book Review: John and William Bartram's America by Helen Gere Cruickshank; by Francis Harper". Journal of Mammalogy. 40 (2): 259–260. doi:10.2307/1376463. ISSN 0022-2372. JSTOR 1376463. OCLC 5550260962.
