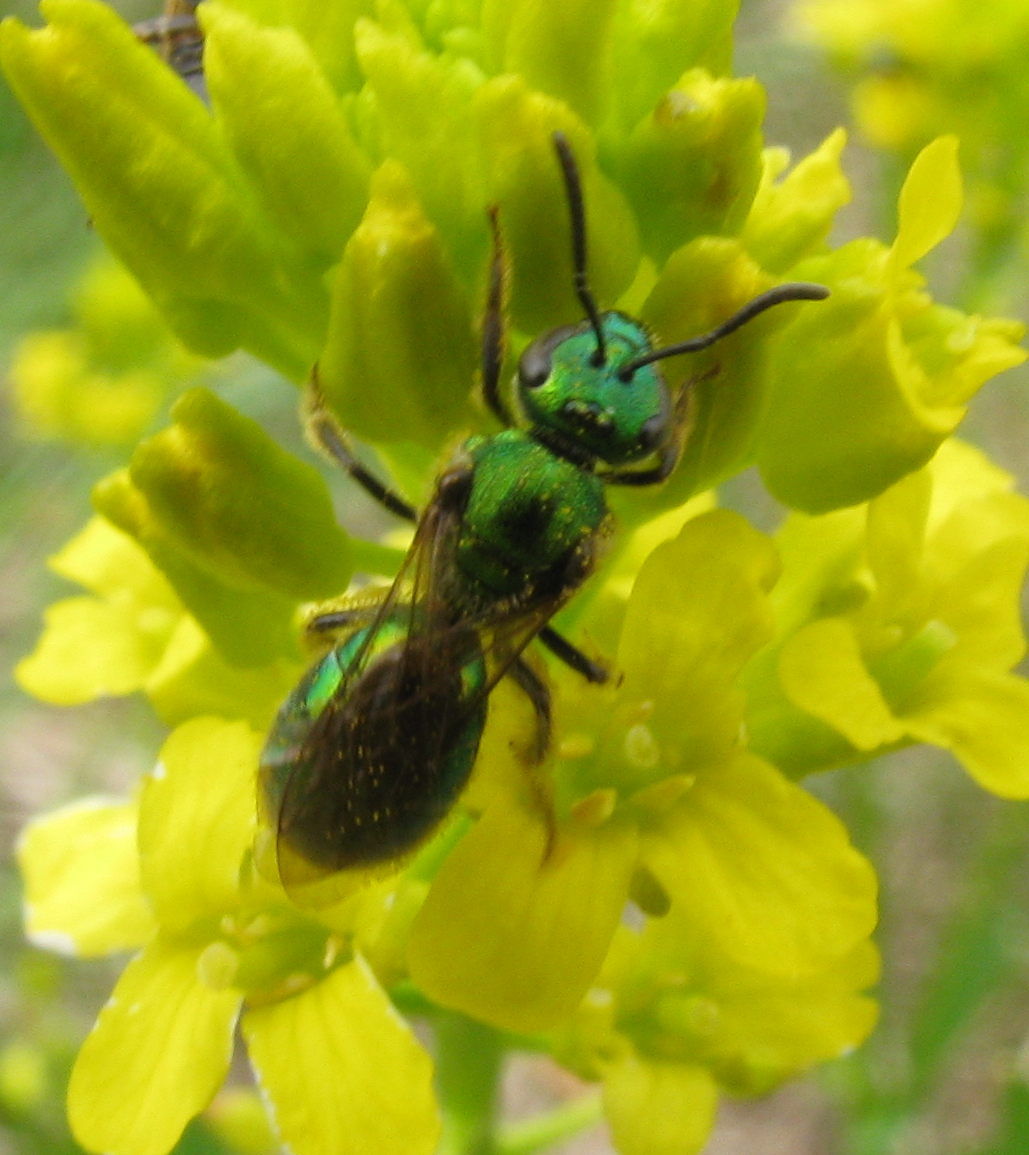
- Augochlorella aurata

Scientific classification
- Kingdom: Animalia
- Phylum: Arthropoda
- Class: Insecta
- Order: Hymenoptera
- Family: Halictidae
- Tribe: Augochlorini
- Genus: Augochlorella; Sandhouse, 1937

= Augochlorella =

Genus of bees

Augochlorella is a genus in the bee family Halictidae, commonly called sweat bees. They display metallic coloration, ranging from reddish to gold to bluish green, as is typical for other genera in the tribe Augochlorini.

== Identification and appearance ==
Augochlorella are very small sweat bees that are easily confused with the related genus Augochlora but differentiated by the pointed tip of the marginal cell (squared off in Augochlora), an orthogonal epistomal sulcus, and no strong basal lobe on the inner metatibial spur.. These features can only be viewed under a microscope.

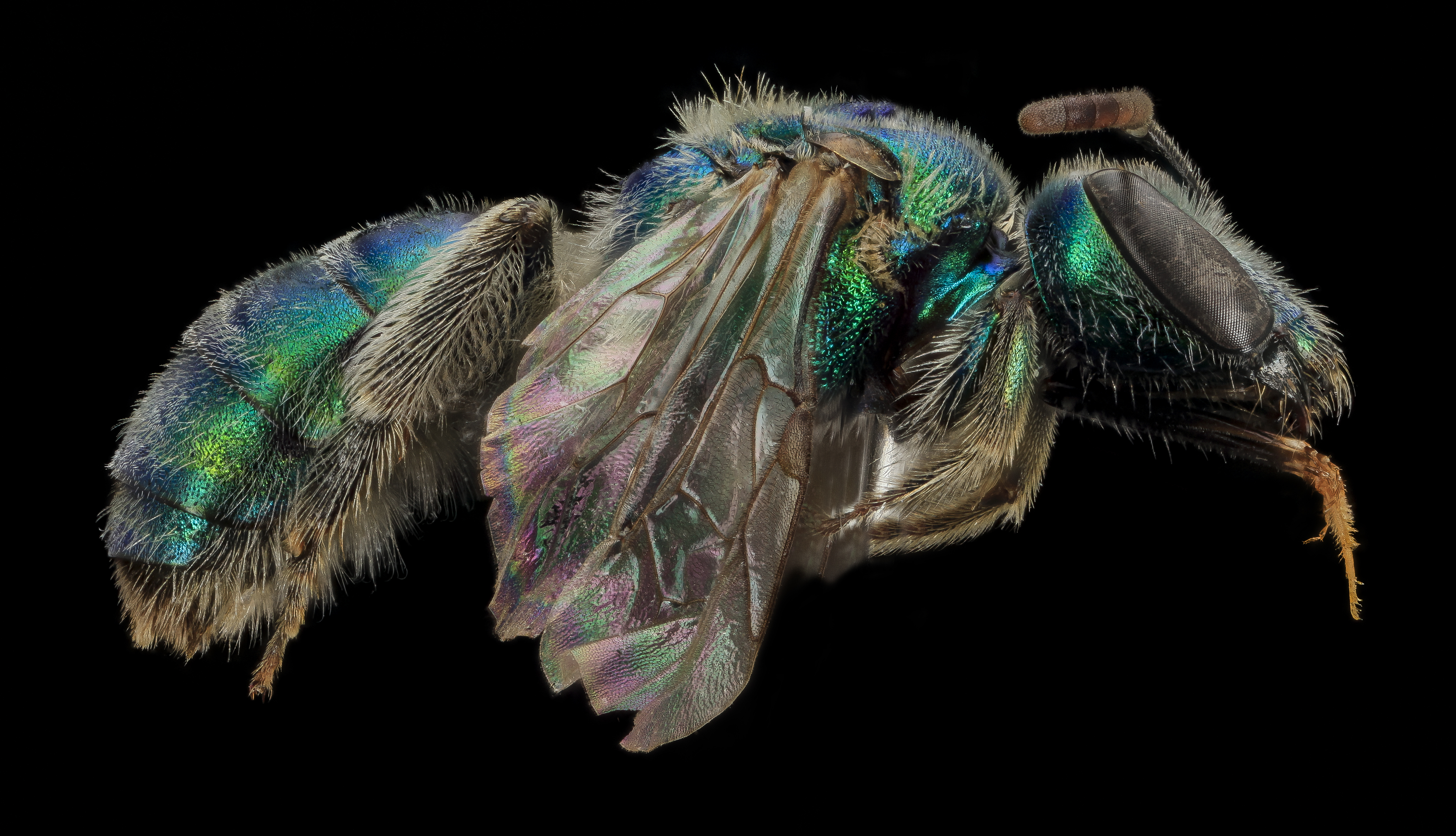
Augochlorella pomoniella

== Origin and distribution ==
The tribe Augochlorini is distributed between northern Argentina to southern Canada, but mostly concentrated to the tropics of the Americas. They are the most abundant bees in the Neotropical fauna. Only a few species of Augochlorella reach the temperate Nearctic region. Augochlorella striata occurs further north than any other member of the tribe.

== Sexual dimorphism ==
Both sexes of Augochlorella have an average length of 7 to 9 mm (0.28 to 0.35 in), but males are more slender than females, and have relatively longer antennae.

== Sociality ==
Augochlorella bees are often eusocial, unlike many other Augochlorini, which are typically either solitary or semisocial.

An example of sociality in this genus is Augochlorella aurata which contains a mixture of solitary and social nest foundresses. These fertile colony-establishing females produce an initial brood of 1-2 worker bees, which are female, before switching to a male-biased brood, while others produce males first. Female-biased broods can also occur in both solitary and eusocial nests, but that is less common. In this and other eusocial species, workers are mostly sterile and slightly smaller than their mothers. Augochlorella aurata tends to be solitary at high altitudes and latitudes. It's also more often solitary in environments where the growing season is shorter, but if the growing season is longer than the species tends to be social. This tendency to base their sociality on the growing season can also be found in other bee species as well as in some species of spiders. A maritime Canadian climate can lead to reduced duration of brood production, fewer workers per nest, and fewer reproductive bees. Additionally, nest foundresses may produce a mixture of workers and reproductively-capable bees based on these conditions.

== Nesting ==
Augochlorella nests can be found in fields as well as wooded locations; well-drained areas, in a wide variety of habitats. The ground is usually flat or sloped and mostly bare. The nests are underground, and the bees create a cavity with a cluster of cells made of soil. There are many ways that bees construct their nests, but usually they excavate the cavity first and then create brood cells within that cavity. The cluster of cells is supported by additional pillars of soil. The burrow tends to be vertical and it can be anywhere from 5 to 25 cm deep; the depth of the burrow depends on how moist the soil is.

In part of its range, the species Augochlorella aurata is active from the start of April until the end of September. Females construct pollen balls, the sole food source for the offspring, starting the second week of May until the middle of August, and workers start expanding the nests in mid June. Queens start making their nests in the middle of April, and usually finish up around the first week of May. The number of cells the bees manage to make varies according to how many worker bees are present in the nest, but usually it is around three cells per female. After they lay the first set of eggs, there is a two-week period of inactivity, and then another set is laid. The mean number of brood cells within the nests increases gradually during the summer, reaching a maximum of 12. Only a few cells are used twice and the number of offspring produced per nest average between 14 and 15, which shows that brood cells are not reused often. Augochlorella aurata and Augochlorella persimilis can sometimes occur together in mixed aggregations.

== Ecological and economic importance ==
The genus Augochlorella consists of generalist pollinators, and visit plants such as Apocynum cannabinum, Erigeron strigosus, Pycnanthemum tenuifolium, Solidago odora, and Euthamia graminifolia.

Augochlorella aurata is found in Rockefeller State Park Preserve in Westchester County, New York where they can be seen pollinating dogbane, fleabane, mountain mint, wild roses, and goldenrod. Wild bees can be important pollinators in cities like New York and keep gardens and parks healthy. Augochlorella aurata is also an important pollinator for many wildflowers and crops, including stone fruits, pome fruits, alfalfa, sunflower, pepper, strawberry, tomato and watermelon plants, making this species very valuable for commercial fruit and vegetable farming. In general, sweat bee populations will increase in an area if there are wildflowers and nesting areas available for them.

== Parasites ==
The family Halictidae contains a few social parasites and kleptoparasitic bee genera, and these parasites affect the genus Augochlorella as well. Some prominent cleptoparasites include Sphecodes (like Sphecodes pimpinellae), Microsphecodes, and some Lasioglossum species. Sphecodes females will typically kill the existing Augochlorella egg or larva in the cell before they lay their own egg. In most other cleptoparasitic species, eggs are laid on the unfinished cell walls or through sealed cells where the cleptoparasite larva will kill the existing egg or larva and eat the host's stored food.

Mite associations with Augochlorella include Laelaspoides ordwayae, which are kleptoparasites that feed on pollen stored in brood cells. Although Laelospoides usually do not harm the developing bee directly, the bee is harmed since there is less food available for it to consume.

== Predators ==
Augochlorella has many general predators including birds, asilid flies, and spiders.

== Flight ==
The typical flight distance for Augochlorella aurata is 66-230 yd. (60-210 m).

== Species ==
There are currently 17 described species of Augochlorella:

- Augochlorella acarinata Coelho, 2004
- Augochlorella aurata (Smith, 1853) [= Augochlorella striata]
- Augochlorella bracteata Ordway, 1966
- Augochlorella comis (Vachal, 1911)
- Augochlorella ephyra (Schrottky, 1910)
- Augochlorella gratiosa (Smith, 1853)
- Augochlorella iopoecila Moure, 1950
- Augochlorella iphigenia (Holmberg, 1886)
- Augochlorella karankawa Coelho, 2004
- Augochlorella meridionalis Coelho, 2004
- Augochlorella neglectula (Cockerell, 1897)
- Augochlorella persimilis (Viereck, 1910)
- Augochlorella pomoniella (Cockerell, 1915)
- Augochlorella stenothoracica Coelho, 2004
- Augochlorella tredecim (Vachal, 1911)
- Augochlorella una Coelho, 2004
- Augochlorella urania (Smith, 1853)
