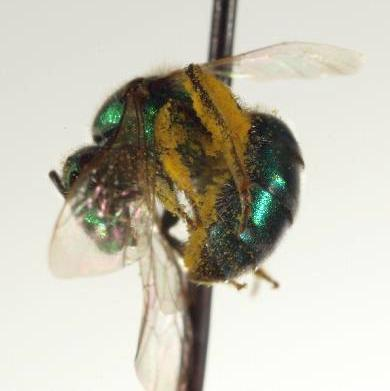

Scientific classification
- Kingdom: Animalia
- Phylum: Arthropoda
- Class: Insecta
- Order: Hymenoptera
- Family: Halictidae
- Tribe: Augochlorini
- Genus: Augochlorella
- Species: A. neglectula

Binomial name
- Augochlorella neglectula (Cockerell, 1897)

= Augochlorella neglectula =

Species of bee

Augochlorella neglectula is a species of sweat bee in the family Halictidae.

== Subspecies ==
These two subspecies belong to the species Augochlorella neglectula:

- Augochlorella neglectula maritima
- Augochlorella neglectula neglectula
