= Augochlora leptoloba =

Augochlora leptoloba Temporal range: Burdigalian

Scientific classification
- Domain: Eukaryota
- Kingdom: Animalia
- Phylum: Arthropoda
- Class: Insecta
- Order: Hymenoptera
- Family: Halictidae
- Genus: Augochlora
- Subgenus: †Electraugochlora
- Species: †A. leptoloba

Binomial name
- †Augochlora leptoloba Engel, 1995

Species of bee

Augochlora leptoloba is a species of sweat bee in the genus Augochlora and the extinct monotypic subgenus Electraugochlora.

== History and classification ==
The species is known from a single female specimen, the holotype, currently in the private collection owned by Ettore Morone of Turin, Italy, as number "M-2521", and which was first studied by Dr. Michael S. Engel. Dr. Engel published his type description in the Bulletin of the American Museum of Natural History volume 250 published in 2000. The subgenus name is a combination of the Latin electrum meaning "amber" and Augochlora, the type genus of the tribe Augochlorini. The species name is derived from a combination of the Greek words leptos which means "small" and lobos which means "lobe".

== Description ==
The type specimen is well preserved in early Miocene (Burdigalian stage) Dominican amber from deposits on the island of Hispaniola. The presence of an epistomal sulcus, the groove defining the lateral and dorsal margin of the clypeus, places A. leptoloba within the large genus Augochlora. However, due to the lack of a preoccipital carina, the ridge behind the simple eyes on the top of the head found in the living member of the genus, A. leptoloba was placed in a new subgenus, Electraugochlora. Overall the holotype has a total length, not including antennae, of 8.5 millimetres (0.33 in) and a forewing length of 4.6 millimetres (0.18 in). As a whole the female has a dull metallic green coloration with faint metallic copper highlights to the head, with the region above the mouth being brown. The legs are brown with no discernible highlights, and the wings are hyaline with brown veins. The thorax, like the head, is dull metallic green coloration with faint metallic copper highlights and the underside of the abdomen brown and the upper side brown with metallic green highlights. The legs and terga possess a coating of short gold colored hair.
