= Megachile pruina =

Scientific classification
- Kingdom: Animalia
- Phylum: Arthropoda
- Class: Insecta
- Order: Hymenoptera
- Family: Megachilidae
- Genus: Megachile
- Species: M. pruina

Binomial name
- Megachile pruina Smith, 1853

Species of leafcutter bee (Megachile)

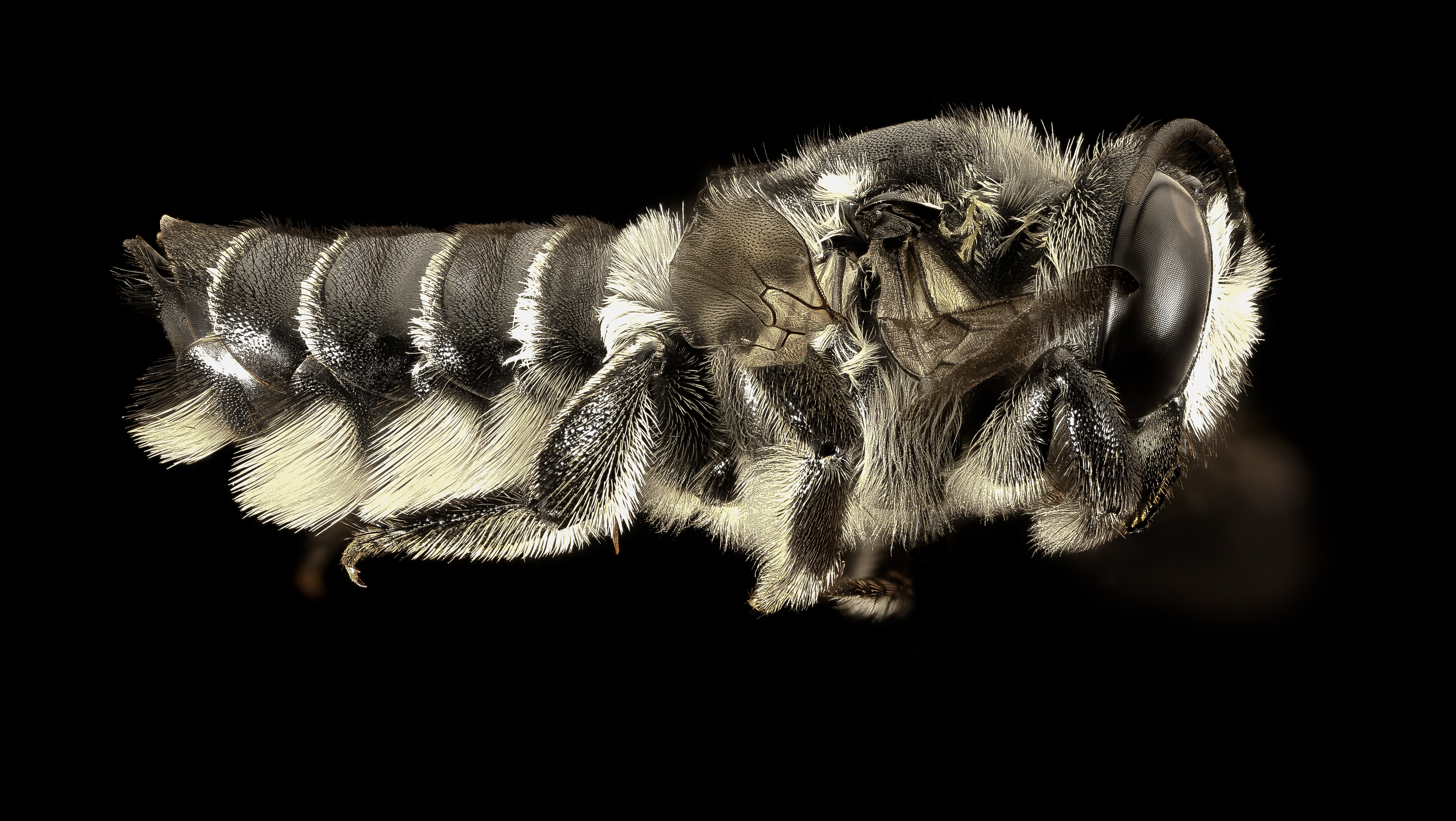
Female M. pruina

Megachile pruina, also known as the Hoary Leafcutter Bee, is a species of bee in the family Megachilidae. It was described by Smith in 1853.

== Taxonomy and phylogeny ==
M. pruina is a species of bee in the subfamily Megachilinae, belonging to the subgenus Pseudocentron Mitchell, 1934. Specimens of M. pruina from Bermuda were initially classified as the subspecies M. pruina bermudensis Mitchell, 1929, but were later reclassified as M. pruina pruina due to their colour resemblance to a specimen from North Carolina. In 1937, a second subspecies, M. pruina nigropinguis Mitchell, was described to account for a dark female variant collected in Texas.

In 2024, a genetic study suggested that populations from Bermuda are genetically distinct from those in the United States. However, U.S. populations showed no significant genetic differences among themselves, suggesting that the formal subspecies classifications may be invalid.

M. pruina shares a monophyletic lineage with other Pseudocentron species and exhibits closer relationships with species collected from the Caribbean and Mexico compared to South American species.

== Description and identification ==
M. pruina is a medium-sized (11–13 mm (0.43–0.51 in)). These bees present a sexual dichromatism, in which the females can be very dark.

== Distribution ==
M. pruina is found in the United States, ranging from Virginia to Florida, and extending westward to Texas mostly along coastal habitats. The species is also considered native to the islands of Bermuda. In Bermuda, since 1989, its distribution has been confined to the Castle Harbour Islands Nature Reserve. Nonsuch Island serves as its primary habitat, with additional observations recorded on Cooper's Island, Southampton Island, Horn Rock, and Castle Island.

== Conservation status ==
Bermuda's population of M. pruina is currently classified as "Vulnerable" under the Protected Species Amendment Order (2016) and is the only arthropod protected under the Bermuda Protected Species Act.
