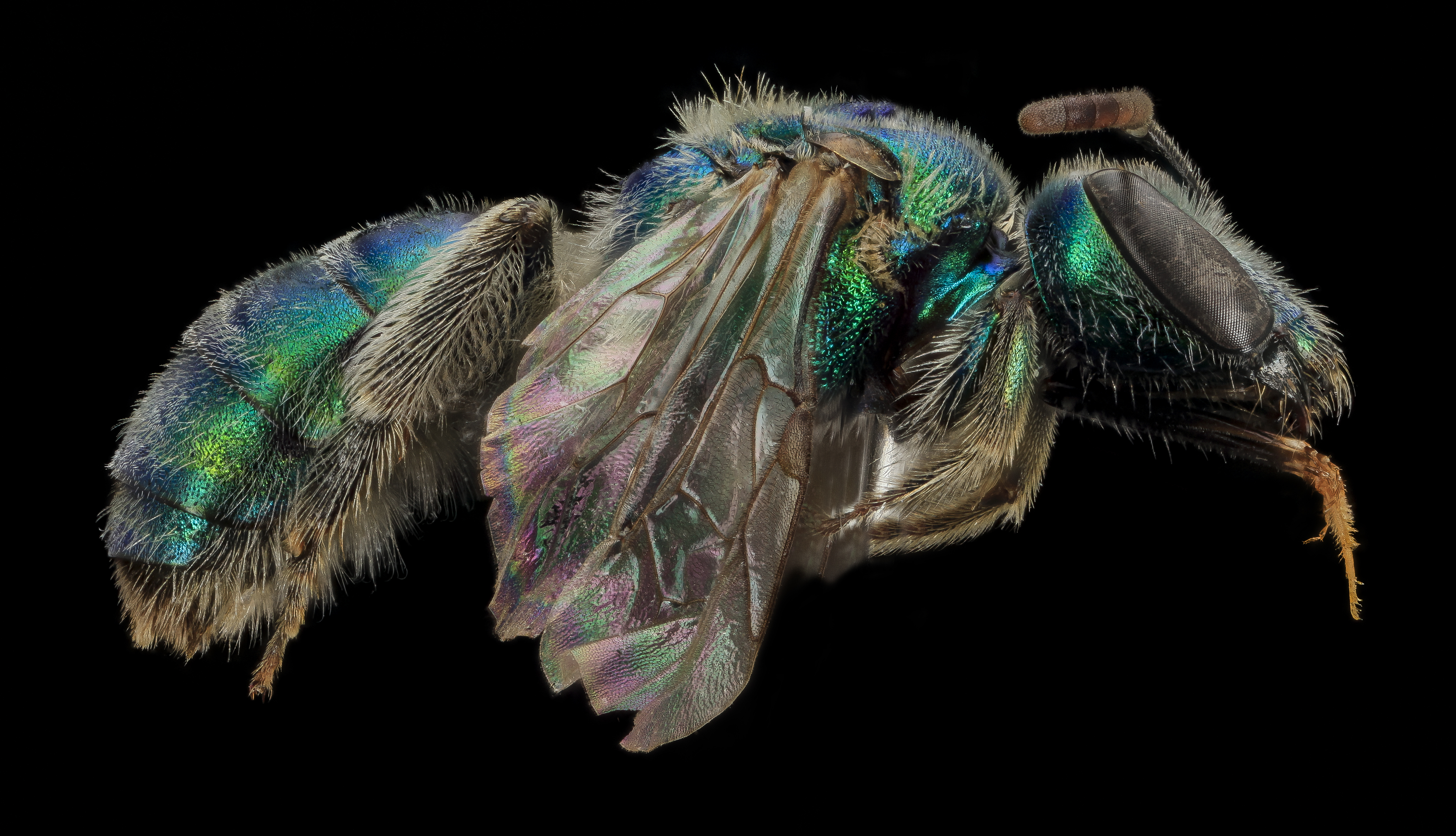

Scientific classification
- Kingdom: Animalia
- Phylum: Arthropoda
- Class: Insecta
- Order: Hymenoptera
- Family: Halictidae
- Genus: Augochlorella
- Species: A. pomoniella

Binomial name
- Augochlorella pomoniella (Cockerell, 1915)

= Augochlorella pomoniella =

Species of bee

Augochlorella pomoniella is a species of sweat bee in the family Halictidae.
