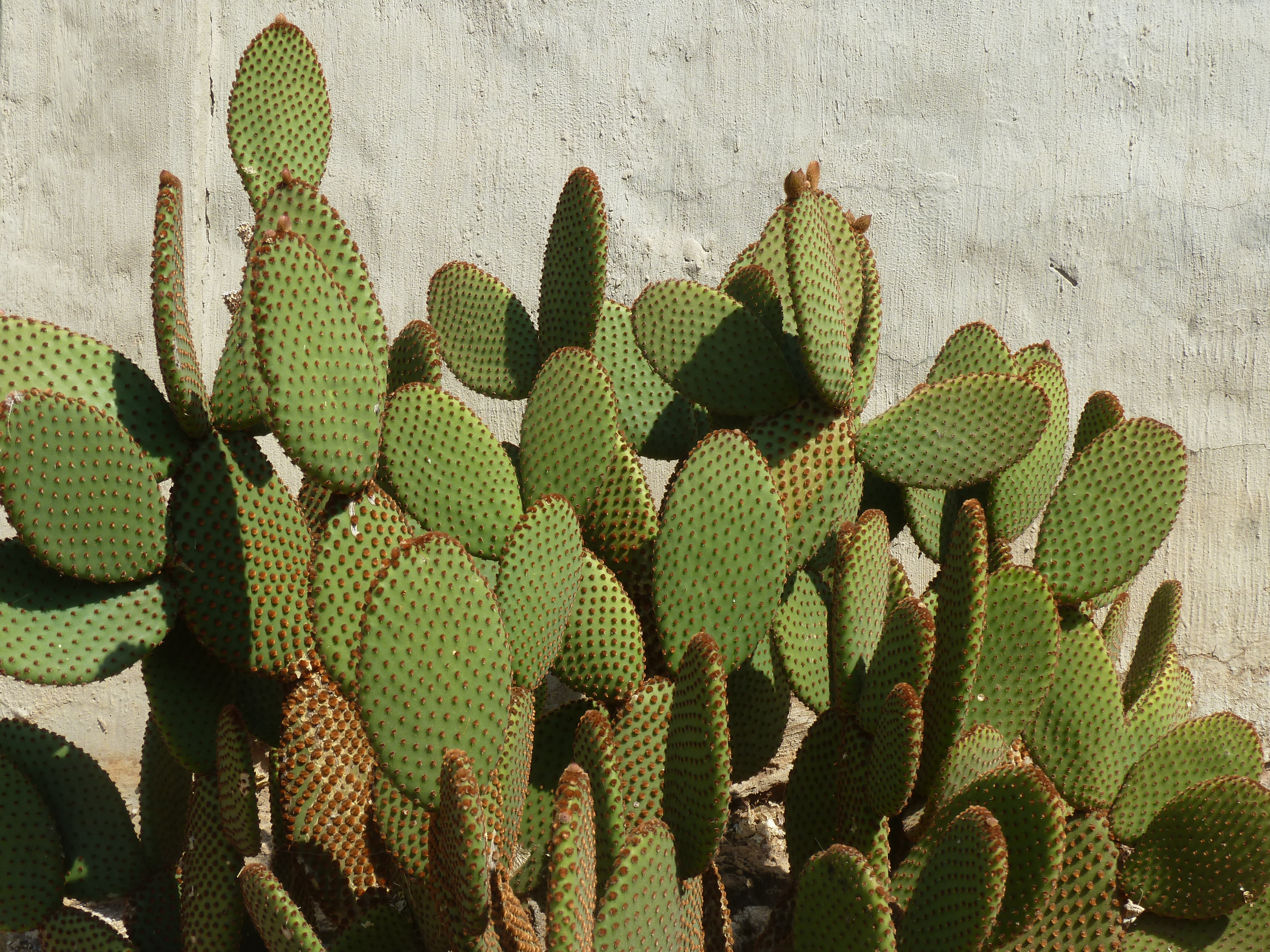

Conservation status
- Least Concern (IUCN 3.1)

Scientific classification
- Kingdom: Plantae
- Clade: Tracheophytes
- Clade: Angiosperms
- Clade: Eudicots
- Order: Caryophyllales
- Family: Cactaceae
- Genus: Opuntia
- Species: O. rufida

Binomial name
- Opuntia rufida Engelmann

= Opuntia rufida =

Blind prickly pear

Species of cactus

Opuntia rufida is a species of prickly pear cactus native to southwestern Texas and northern Mexico, where it grows on rocky slopes. The species makes up for its total lack of spines with a profusion of red-brown glochids. The common name blind prickly pear or cow blinder comes from the fact that the glochids may be carried away by the wind and blind animals.

The plant is closely related to Opuntia microdasys, and is sometimes taken as its subspecies, O. m. subsp. rufida.

A commonly sold cultivar is Opuntia Rufida Minima Monstrose

== Description ==
Opuntia rufida is a multi-branched cactus that may reach 3 to 5 feet (0.9 to 1.5 m) tall and a bit wider. The plant generally has a short trunk, and the thickish, tomentose pads are subcircular, obovate, or elliptical. Areoles are spineless but have showy red-brown glochids. In mid-spring the plant produces a profusion of brilliant yellow flowers changing to orange and red, 3 to 4 inches (8 to 10 cm) across. In summer, the oblong fruit is bright red to purple, 2 to 3 inches (5 to 8 cm) long.

The plant can be a spectacular addition to the desert garden. It requires full sun and is highly tolerant of desert heat. However, the glochids tend to dislodge easily when the plant is bumped or shaken and they can be dangerous to humans and animals if carried by the wind. In fact, the common name blind prickly pear or cow blinder refers to the blinding of animals by the airborne glochids. The species rufida refers to the ruddy, reddish-brown glochids.

== Range ==
Opuntia rufida is native to the Big Bend area of southwestern Texas and the Chihuahuan Desert of northern Mexico.

=== Introduced Range ===
Opuntia rufida has been planted as an ornamental in Queensland, Australia but has since been recognized as Prohibited invasive plant under the Biosecurity Act 2015. As a result, it may not be sold or moved and must be reported to Biosecurity Queensland.

== Gallery ==
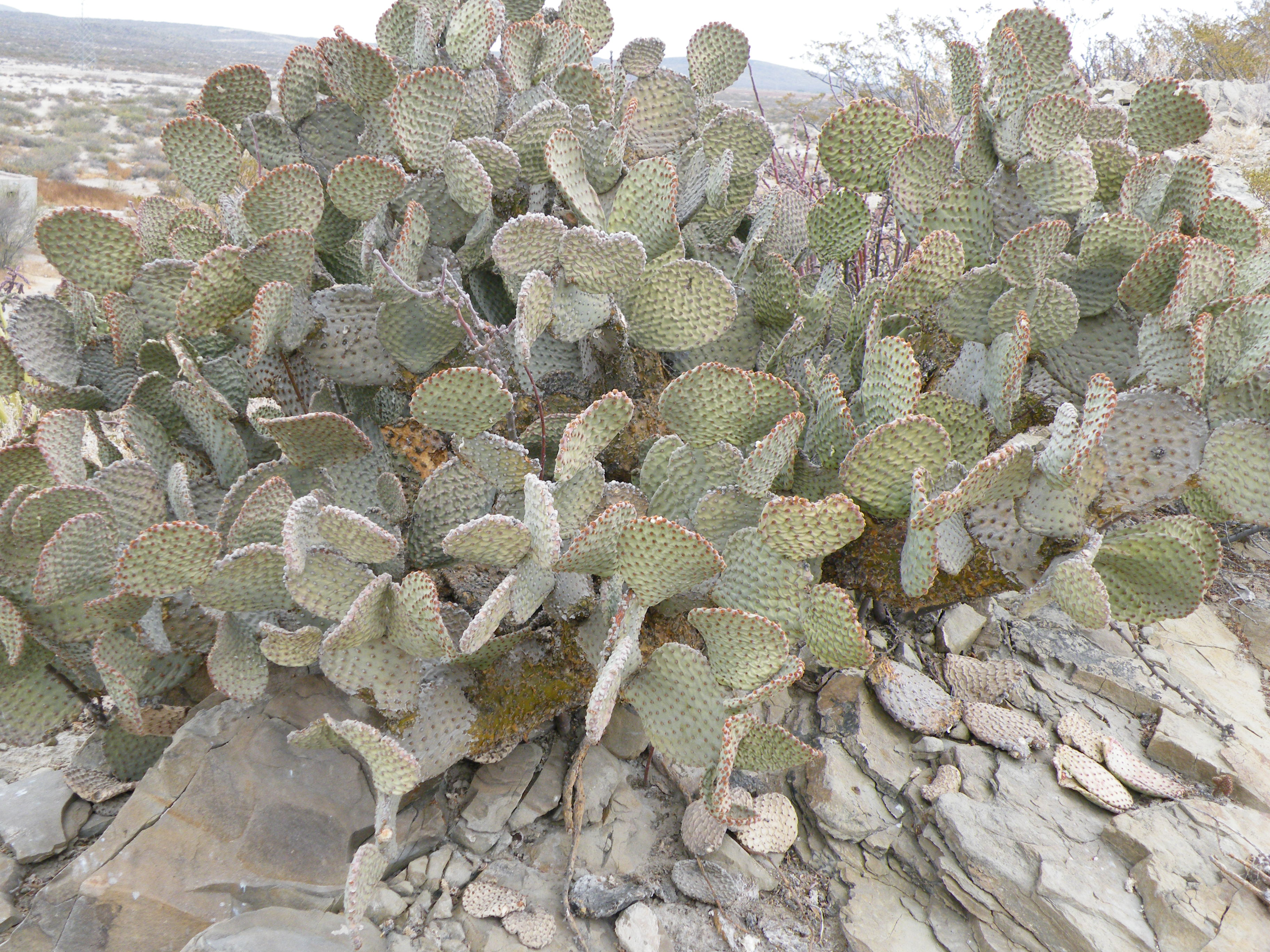
At Coahuila, Mexico

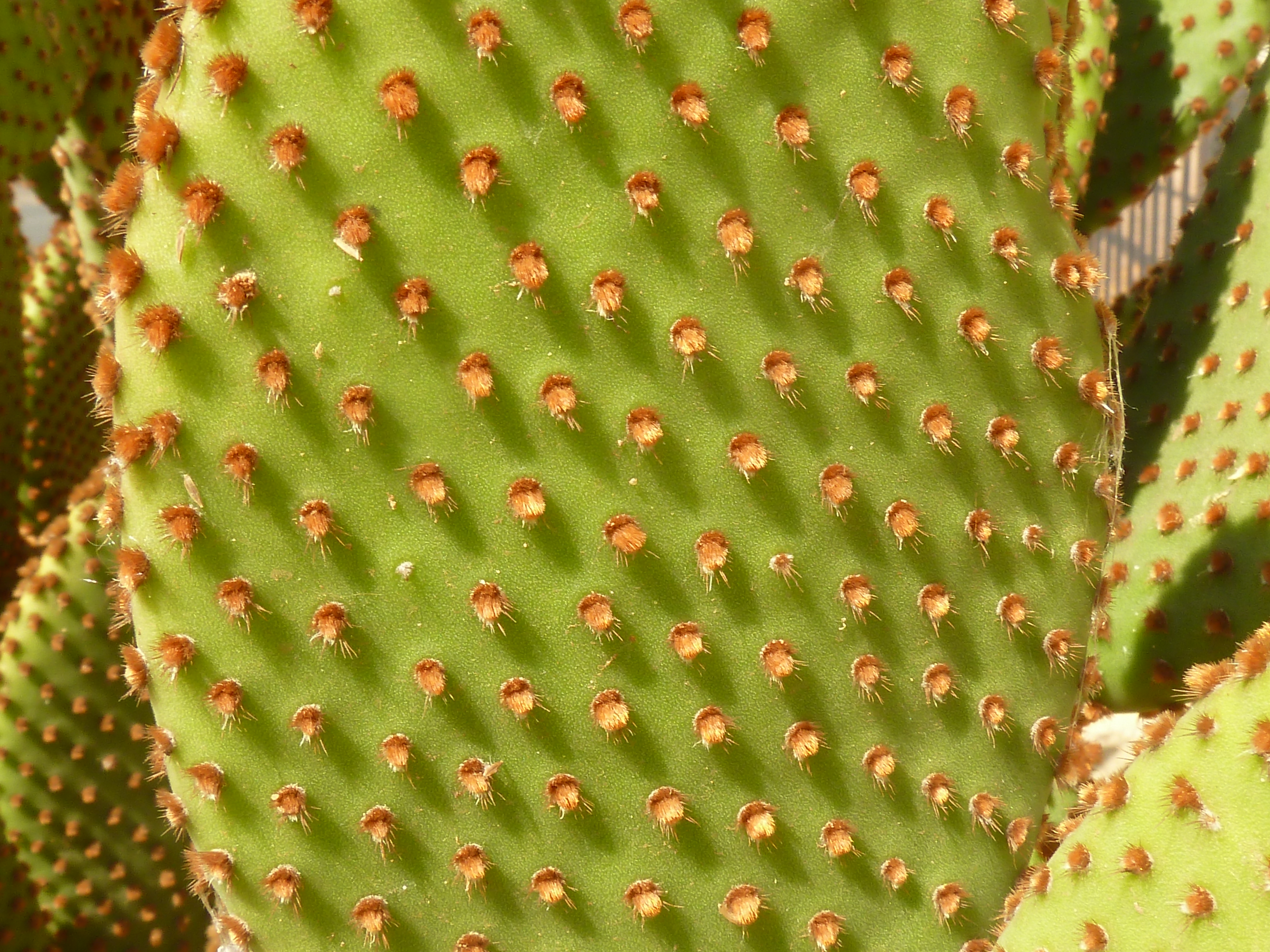
Cladode with glochids

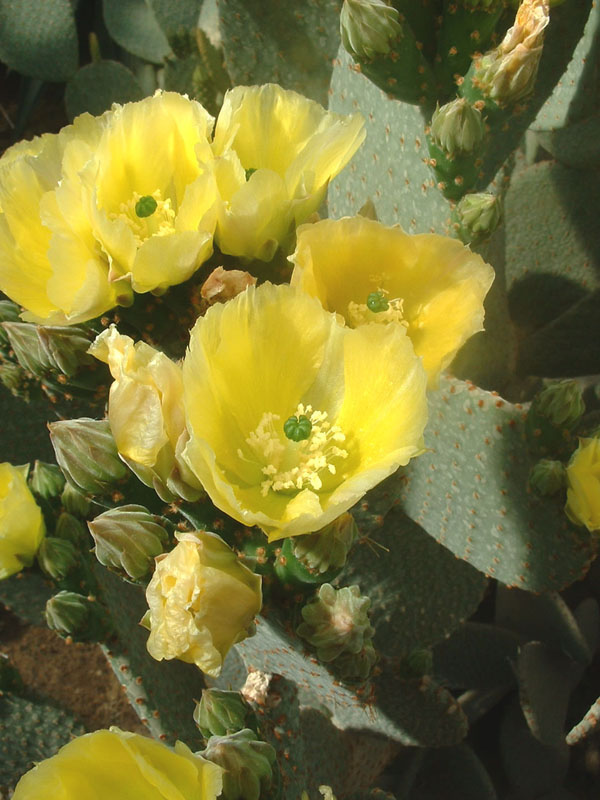
Flowers

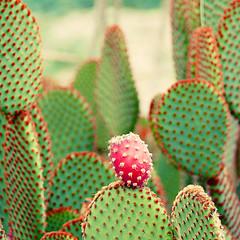
Opuntia in the El Boticario de Almería park, Spain.
