= Augochlora azteca =

Scientific classification
- Domain: Eukaryota
- Kingdom: Animalia
- Phylum: Arthropoda
- Class: Insecta
- Order: Hymenoptera
- Family: Halictidae
- Tribe: Augochlorini
- Genus: Augochlora
- Species: A. azteca

Binomial name
- Augochlora azteca (Vachal, 1911)

Species of bee

Augochlora azteca, the Aztec augochlora, is a species of sweat bee in the family Halictidae.
