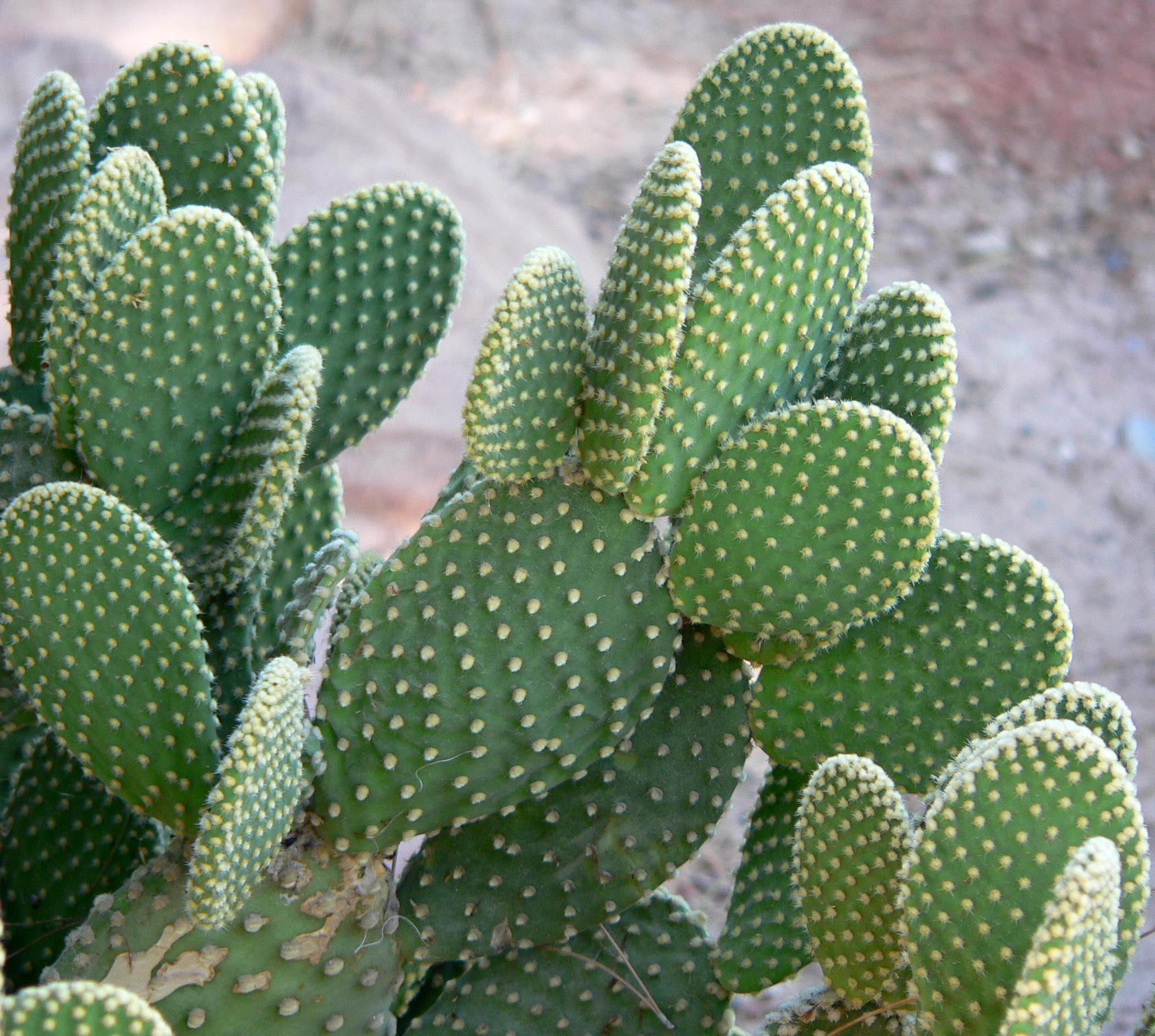

Conservation status
- Least Concern (IUCN 3.1)

Scientific classification
- Kingdom: Plantae
- Clade: Tracheophytes
- Clade: Angiosperms
- Clade: Eudicots
- Order: Caryophyllales
- Family: Cactaceae
- Genus: Opuntia
- Species: O. microdasys

Binomial name
- Opuntia microdasys (Lehm.) Pfeiff.

Synonyms
- Cactus microdasys Lehm.; Opuntia macrocalyx Griffiths; Opuntia microdasys subvar. albiflora Backeb.; Opuntia microdasys var. albispina Fobe; Opuntia microdasys var. laevior Salm-Dyck; Opuntia microdasys var. minor Salm-Dyck; Opuntia microdasys f. minor (Salm-Dyck) Schelle; Opuntia microdasys var. pallida Borg; Opuntia pulvinata DC.

= Opuntia microdasys =

Species of cactus

Opuntia microdasys (angel's-wings, bunny ears cactus, bunny cactus or polka-dot cactus) is a species of flowering plant in the cactus family, Cactaceae. It is native and endemic to central and northern Mexico.

== Description ==
Opuntia microdasys forms a dense shrub 40–60 cm tall, occasionally more, composed of pad-like stems 6–15 cm long and 4–12 cm broad.

Instead of spines it has numerous white or yellow glochids 2–3 mm long in dense clusters. They are barbed and thinner than the finest human hairs, detaching in large numbers upon the slightest touch. If not removed they will cause considerable skin irritation so the plants must be treated with caution.

The Latin specific epithet microdasys means "small and hairy".

The yellow flowers appear only rarely. Despite this, it is a very popular cactus in cultivation, partly because of the young plant's comical resemblance to a rabbit's head. It has gained the Royal Horticultural Society's Award of Garden Merit.

== Distribution ==
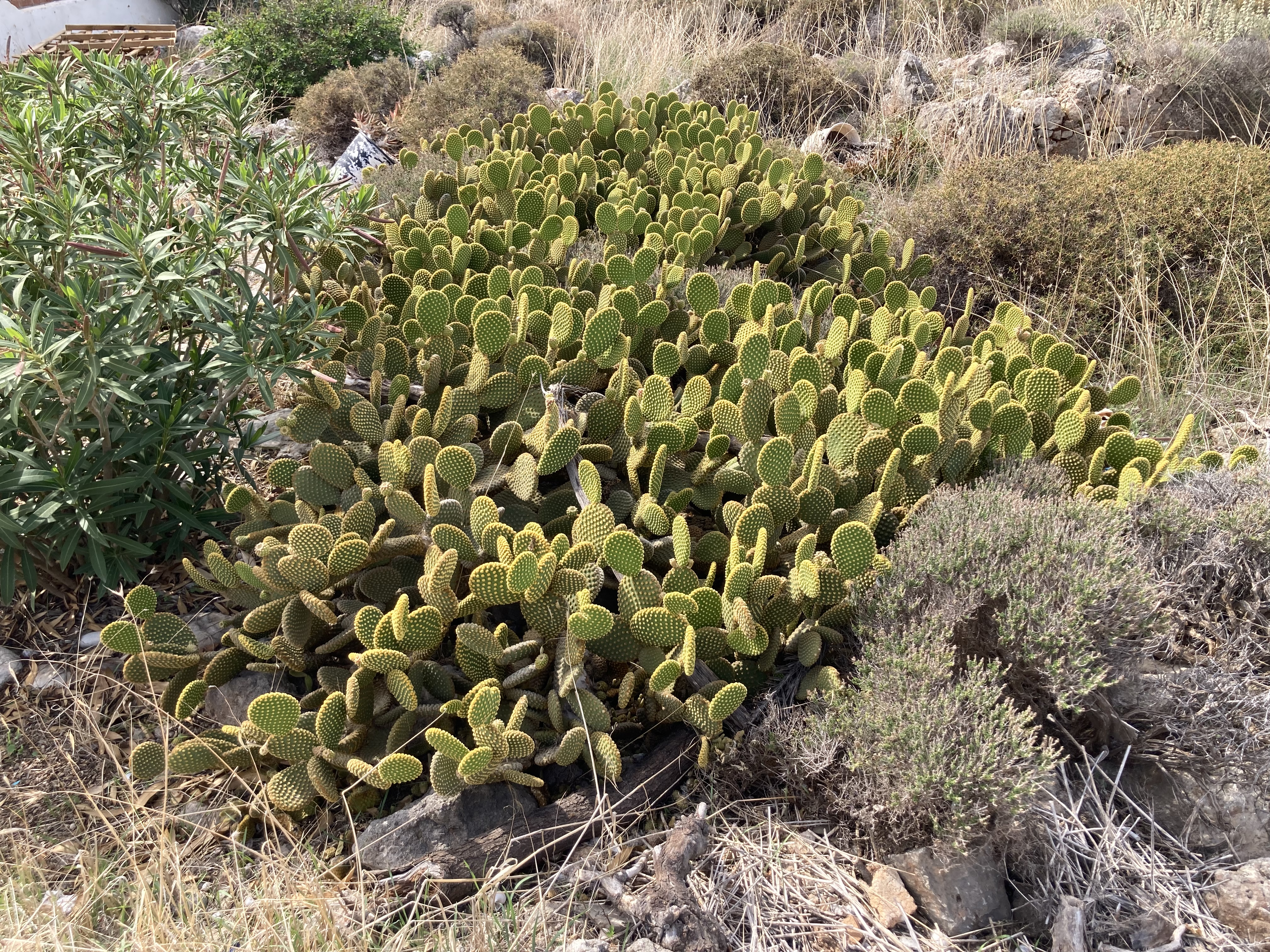
Opuntia microdasys specimen naturalized in Kythira.

Native to Mexico, naturalised in Kenya, Malawi, and Tanzania. One reason for the success of O. microdasys in desert habitats - at home and as an introduction - is its efficient fog collection ability. The hairs have the perfect structure and microstructure to capture and channel fog.

== Related Species ==
The very closely related Opuntia rufida differs in having reddish-brown glochids. It occurs further north in northern Mexico, and into western Texas. Some botanists treat the two as a single species.

== Species Comparison Gallery ==
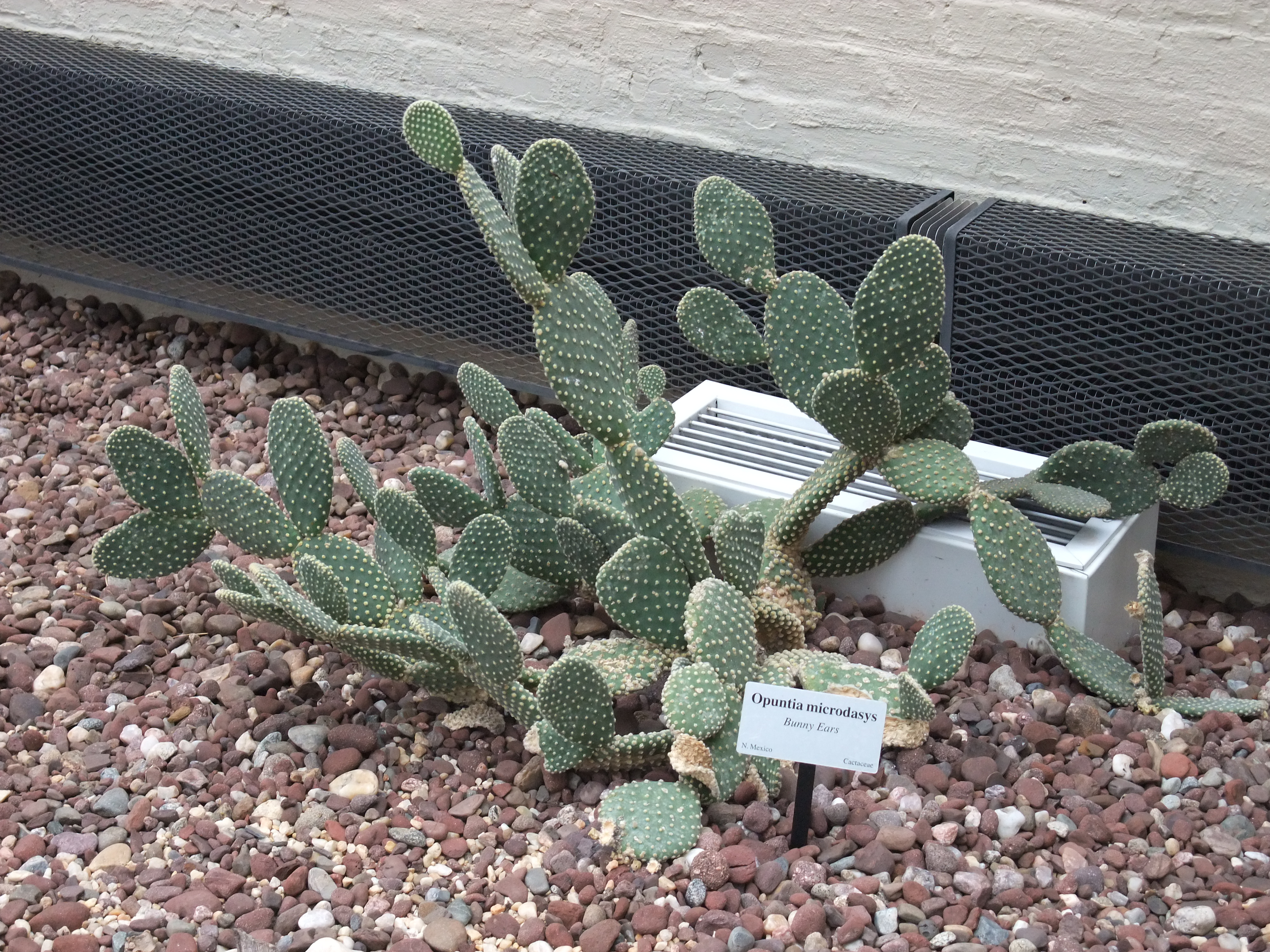
Opuntia microdasys

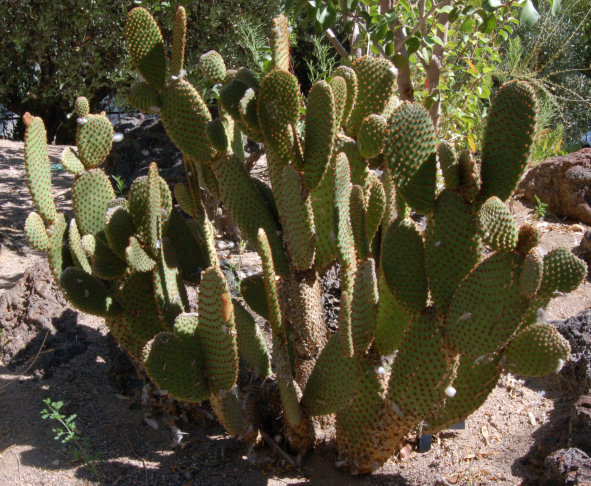
Opuntia rufida
