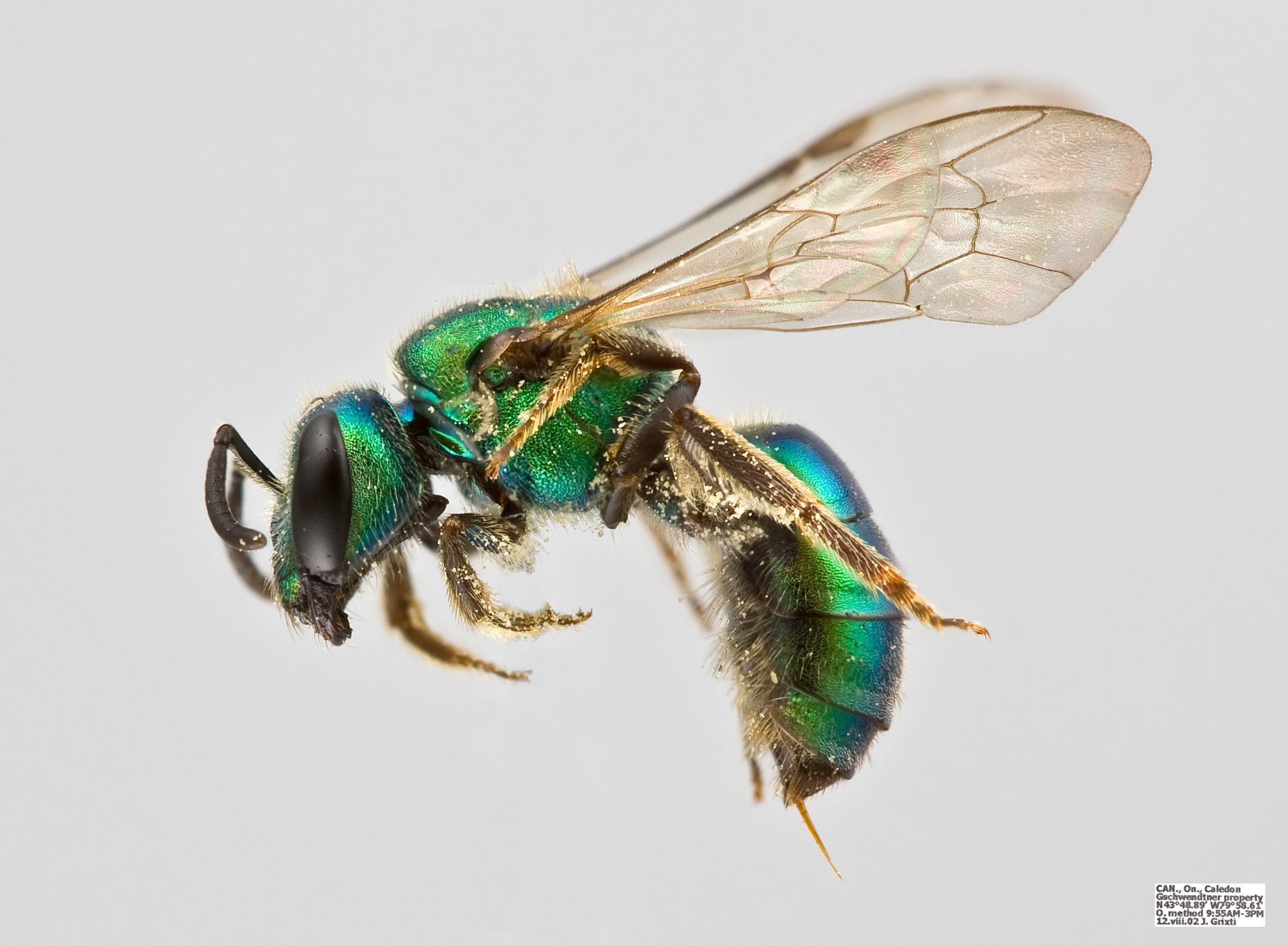
- Female Augochlora pura

Scientific classification
- Kingdom: Animalia
- Phylum: Arthropoda
- Class: Insecta
- Order: Hymenoptera
- Family: Halictidae
- Tribe: Augochlorini
- Genus: Augochlora; Smith, 1853

Subgenera
- Augochlora sensu stricto; Oxystoglossa; †Electraugochlora

= Augochlora =

Augochlora Temporal range: Burdigalian to Present

Genus of bees

Augochlora is a genus in the family Halictidae, with 127 valid species found across the Nearctic and Neotropic zones. The genus is known for its typical metallic greenish blue color and small size, with the greek for Augochloros meaning shining green.

== Taxonomy ==
Augochlora is taxonomically located within the tribe Augochlorini. This tribe has many genera that can be separated in groups, with the Augochlora genus being in the Augochlora group alongside Augochlorella, Ceratalictus and Pereirapis. Within the genus there are three subgenera - Augochlora s str., Oxystoglossa, and the extinct Electraugochlora. The distribution of this genus across the Americas is not even. Only a few species are present in the United States, approximately 40 are in Mesoamerica, and the rest are in the Neotropics.

=== Subgenera ===
==== Oxystoglossa ====
Out of the 126 species of Augochlora recognized in 2022, 29 species fell within the subgenus Oxystoglossa. Recent studies suggest otherwise, claiming there are actually 32 species. They are distributed from the Southern USA to central Argentina. The subgenus is identified via different traits for the males and females. The male has a long setae on the outer lobe of ventral gonostylus and a light yellow basitarus. The female has appressed setae on the pseudopygidial area and a smaller preapical tooth They both are also a less iridescent blue.

==== Augochlora s str. ====
Augochlora sensu stricto has 97 species (as of 2022) and is identifiable by its transverse basal elevation on the labrum and noticeably bidentate mandible. While they are known as being a solitary species that nests in soil, there is evidence of species having broods with a social phase. There used to be a fourth subgenus, Augochlora Mycterochlora that was since combined with Augochlora Augochlora in the year 2000.

==== Electraugochlora ====
Electraugochlora is a subgenera of Augochlora that is extinct. It was determined to be a subgenera based on one specimen found in Miocene Dominican amber. The description of the females of this subgenus are that of the one specimen "Mandible with moderate subapical tooth. Labral basal elevation orbicular, low and not protuberant (figs. 80, 81). Angle of epistomal sulcus only weakly protruding into clypeus (figs. 80, 81). Preoccipital ridge rounded. S1 without median ridge or spine." The only individual found was a female, making the male phenotype unknown.

== Biology ==
=== Description ===
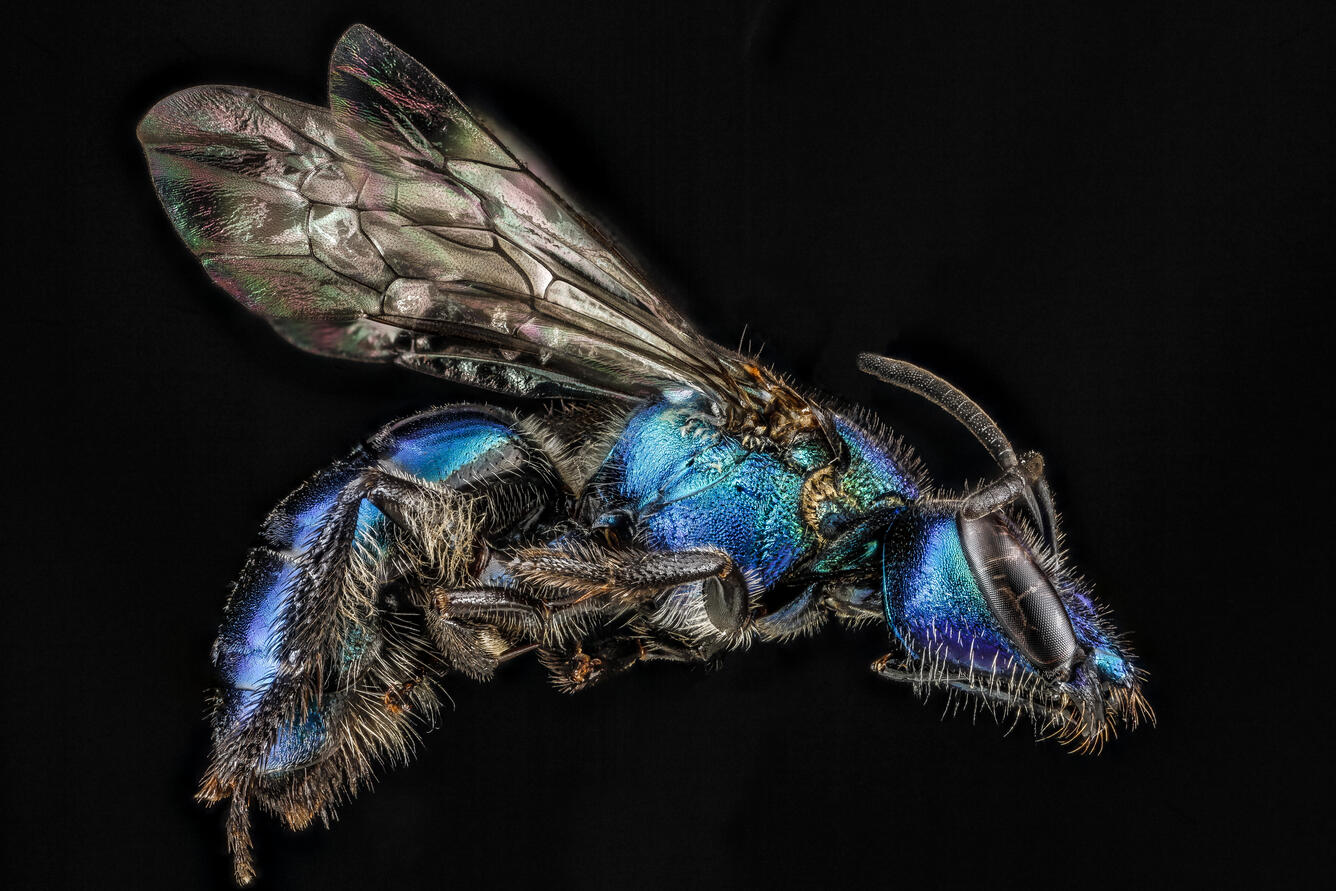
Augochlora regina, female, March 2012 Dominican Republic, formerly A. elegans

The bees of the genus Augochlora are small to moderate in size. All species are metallic and they come in a variety of colors. The most notable coloration is greenish blue there are a few species in the tropics with a blue, red, purple or black hue. Their bodies are considered andreniform, having a long abdomen and slender form.

=== Behavior and life cycle ===
The genus comprises solitary and primitively eusocial species that nest primarily in forests. Most are known to nest in rotting wood, with a few nesting in soil banks. Like other solitary bee species, the solitary nests are often built by a single female and vary in both orientation and arrangement. Some consist of pillars holding up cell clusters while others are cells deriving from a main tunnel. The reasoning as to why Augochlora females choose certain nesting sites are unknown.

In some species, it has been observed that nests are layered with a waxy material. Studies on the species Augochlora pura have indicated a connection between this material and their Dufour's gland. It is thought that this waxy layer is there to prevent desiccation and provide protection from pathogens.

As typical with other solitary bees, the females provide each cell with a ball of pollen. This genus appears to provision its young with pollen from many different flowers. Augochlora esox collects pollen for its eggs from six different families of plants, and Augochlora pura collects from 40 different species of plants from 20 families.

Several species in this genus have been shown to be bi or multi voltine, meaning they have multiple generations in a year. Flight seasons in this genus are long, with Augochlora pura being observed from April to September.

In the eusocial species there are foundress females and worker females. One example of this is the species Augochlora phoemonoe. Their nest starts with one female bee acting as a solitary bee. However once her daughters are born the eusocial phase begins and the foundress stays around the nest. Within the nest, the daughters or worker females perform more of the locomotive actions, such as pollen collecting and guarding the nest. The foundress however, starts all communications and is responsible for reproduction, having more developed ovaries than the daughter bees. The morphology of both castes are similar, with the foundress having a slightly larger size.

== Distribution ==
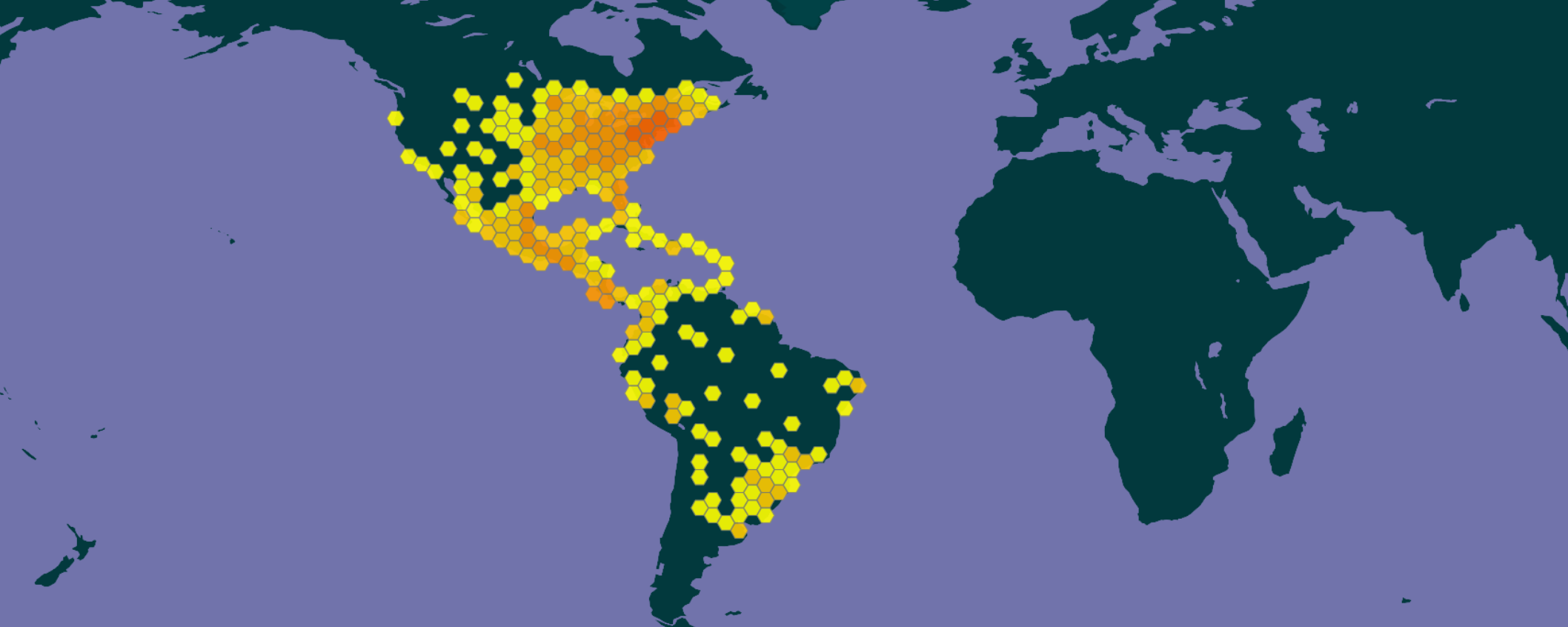
Map of the distribution of the Augochlora genus provided by GBIF

Species are distributed throughout all of South America up to the Southern parts of Canada and on some of the Caribbean islands. They do not live in very dry areas, choosing to nest primarily in forests.

Not much is known about the population status of this genus. On the IUCN Red List, there is only one species in the genus, Augochlora smaragdina, and it is listed under least concern, with population trends unknown. On Nature Serve there are a few species with a population status including:

- Augochlora aurifera - G5 secure
- Augochlora azteca - GU Unrankable
- Augochlora nigrocyanea - G5 secure
- Augochlora pura - G5 secure

== See also ==
- List of Augochlora species
