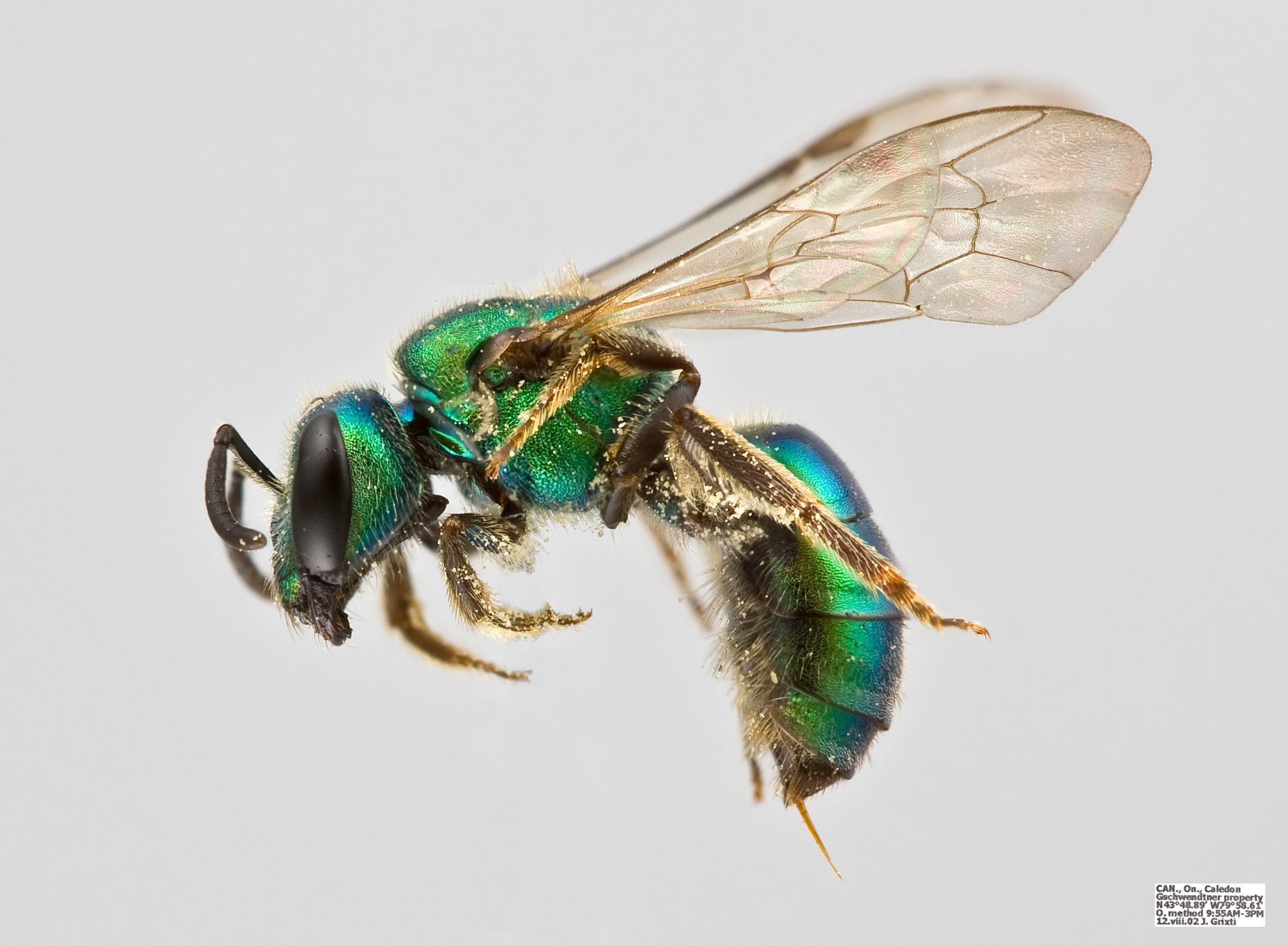
- Female Augochlora pura

Scientific classification
- Kingdom: Animalia
- Phylum: Arthropoda
- Clade: Pancrustacea
- Class: Insecta
- Order: Hymenoptera
- Family: Halictidae
- Genus: Augochlora
- Species: A. pura

Binomial name
- Augochlora pura (Say, 1837)

Synonyms
- Halictus purus Say, 1837; Augochlora festiva Smith, 1853; Augochlora robertsoni Cockerell, 1897; Augochlora banksiella Cockerell, 1907; Halictus astios Vachal, 1911; Halictus fuscatipes Vachal, 1911; Halictus asaphes Vachal, 1911; Augochlora palmarum Cockerell, 1922; Augochlora mosieri Cockerell, 1922

= Augochlora pura =

Species of insect

Augochlora pura is a solitary sweat bee found primarily in the Eastern United States. It is known for its bright green color and its tendency to forage on a variety of plants. Inhabiting rotting logs, this bee can produce up to three generations per year. Both males and females have been observed licking sweat from human skin, most likely seeking salt.

Augochlora pura was recently suggested the common name Pure Green Sweat Bee, but about it has been written that "...it does not seem to need one with such a musical scientific designation that means 'pure golden green.'"

== Taxonomy and phylogeny ==
Within Halictidae, 4 subfamilies, 81 genera, and over 4,000 species have been defined. About 1,000 of the species in the genera Halictus, Lasioglossum, Augochlora, and Augochlorella, are eusocial.

== Description and identification ==
Both males and females are approximately 8 mm long. Over most of the range of the species, their entire bodies are a shiny, bright green, in contrast to many Lasioglossum species such as L. zephyrus, which are a dull metallic green. Male Augochlora pura tend to have darker mandibles and may be slightly more bluish than females, but otherwise, males and females are similar. Both sexes are a deep blue metallic color in Florida, and this color form was previously treated as a separate taxon, Augochlora pura mosieri.

== Distribution and habitat ==
A. pura is found mainly in the eastern United States. It ranges from Maine through Minnesota south through Texas and Florida. A. pura has been documented as far north as Quebec. Its active season is February through November, with the longer seasons in the more southern states. A. pura builds its nests in rotting wood in forests and even wood piles in suburbia. It spends most of its time near its nests, but also visits nearby brush and pastures. According to a study on the bottomland hardwood forest of the southeastern United States, A. pura accounted for about 91% of bees collected in the area.

== Life cycle ==
Augochlora pura has a flight season from early April through September, but nests are active only from early May to early August. Unlike other halictids, A. pura does not take flight in response to warm days later in the fall. There are two to three generations per year in nature, as limited by the seasons, but bees in the laboratory have been shown to produce at least six generations per year. There is no reason to believe these generations would not continue indefinitely. In nature, females become active in August and September, mate, and remain in a state of ovarian diapause on moist soil beneath rotting logs. In contrast, all males die in the fall. Overwintered females found new nests in April. Their offspring emerge in June, and proceed to found nests of their own by the end of the month. Males tend to emerge from the first cells built, and females emerge shortly thereafter. Males in the laboratory live on average about 14.88 days.

== Nest construction ==
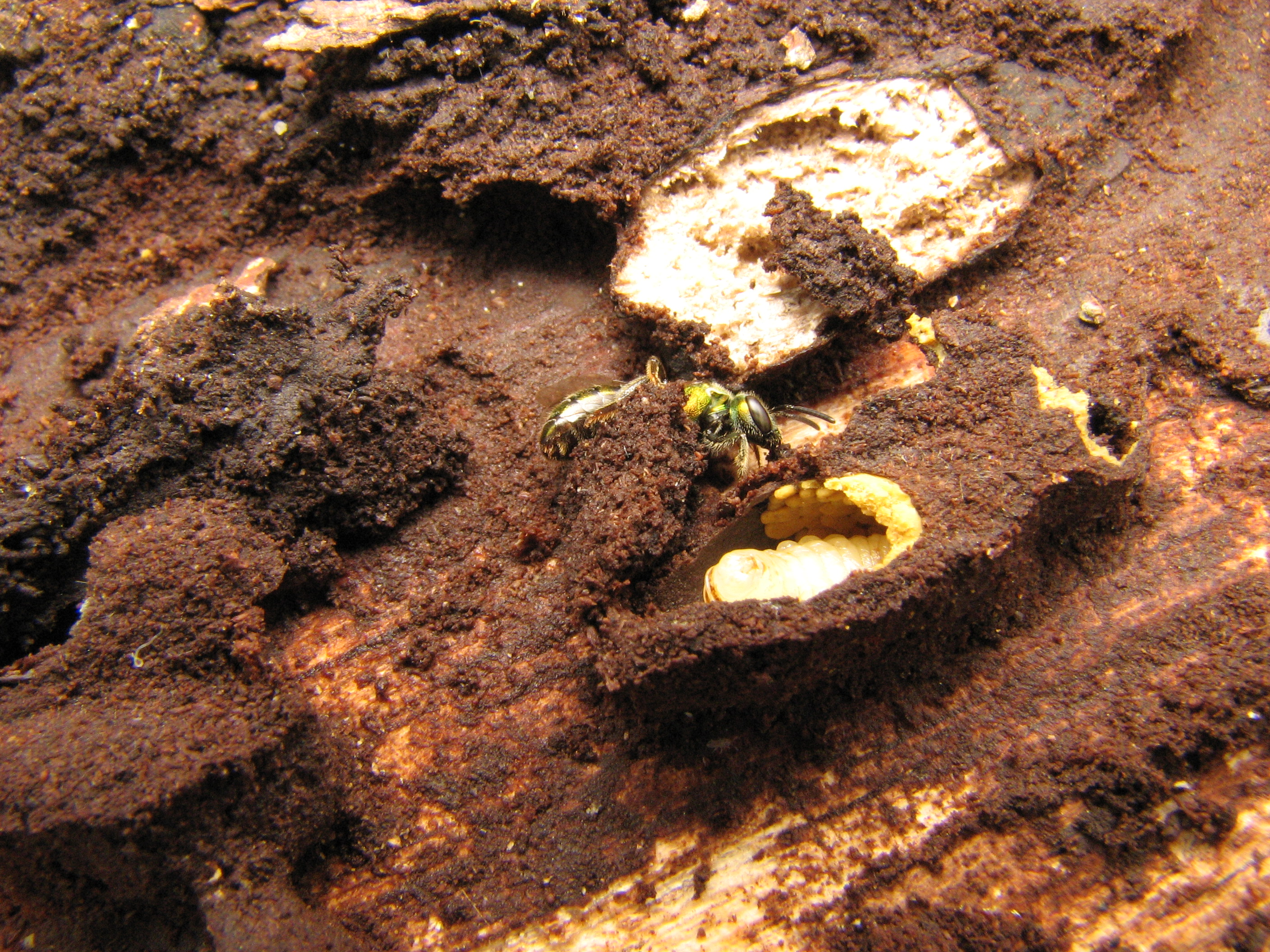
Nest under bark and cell with food and larva

Augochlora pura uses the burrows of other insects as its own burrow starting points, and makes a variety of architectural structures within the xylem and phloem of fallen trees. Depending on the availability of resources, they may construct cluster nests with superimposed horizontal layers, platform nests with all cells within one plane, and tunnel nests with single or chainlike rows. Nests are often intermediates of these three types. Cells begin as wood fragments supported by the floor or ceiling. Then, this framework is coated with substrate and finally a waxy coating. This waxy coating is thought to be the product of an enzyme-mediated polyesterification of secretions of the Dufour's gland.

== Behavior ==
=== Social behavior ===
As solitary bees, A. pura females do not remain in their mother's nest if she is alive. However, there may be times in which A. pura females group together. When the mother is old or deceased, multiple young females may live as a group. Multiple females have also been seen huddled together while overwintering. There is no worker caste, and reproductive females are not cooperative. Bees attempting to enter a nest that does not belong to them will be promptly attacked. Mothers have even been observed to attack their own offspring. If nests meet by chance, a wall is quickly constructed between them. Males return to the same sleeping places each night, and may sleep in groups of up to six males, but only if sleeping places are limited. In this case, all males sleeping together face the same direction. Males enter vacant nests and attack any other males attempting to enter.

=== Cell recognition ===
A. pura is able to avoid destroying new cells. They differentiate them from other walls of the burrows through the odor of fresh pollen in combination with the shape and texture of new cells. They are thought to be able to feel the texture and integrity of walls to determine their composition.

=== Mating behavior ===
Augochlora pura mates while visiting flowers. All, or nearly all, females mate. Males fly in swarms and hover over flowers. They fly from flower to flower and feed, and land on any similarly sized insect on a flower. In fact, they even pounce on black dots on paper. When a male finds a receptive female, he mates with her for from three seconds through two minutes. Instead of pursuing females in the air, A. pura males wait for them to land on flowers. As in Lasioglossum zephyrum, the odors of A. pura females function as aphrodisiacs. Males have been observed to stack themselves on top of a copulating male, attempting to mate with that one female. Augochlora pura males have been observed to stroke the female's head with their antennae before and during copulation. During copulation, the male will release his grasp and remain connected only by his genitalia. Females may attempt to crawl or bite the male's metasoma. Copulation in the field lasts for approximately 28.5 seconds. Males have not been shown to have a preference for either young or old females.

=== Daily rhythms ===
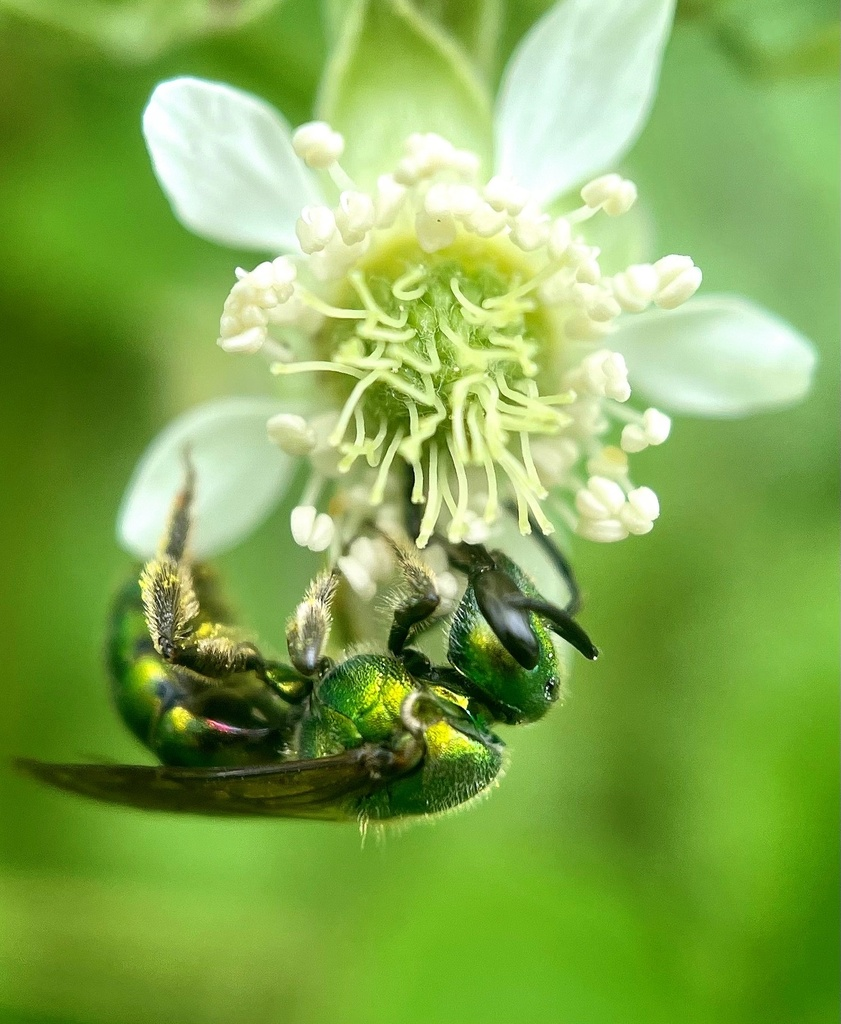
A. pura on a flower

Females behave rhythmically during their nesting phase. They construct cells, one at a time, during the night. They forage throughout the morning, feeding on nectar first, and then collecting pollen. Then, they spend their afternoons forming balls of provisions, performing oviposition, and capping cells. If guarding occurs, it tends to happen during midday or the afternoon.

=== Economy of labor ===
Augochlora pura is known for its economy of labor. It can build its cells in various arrangements depending on environmental constraints. Steps in the cell construction process are sometimes omitted. For example, the primary cell construction is skipped if an old cell can be utilized. This plasticity is pivotal to the parasitic and social behaviors of halictids.

=== Foraging behavior ===
A pure green sweat bee foraging on yellow ironweed.

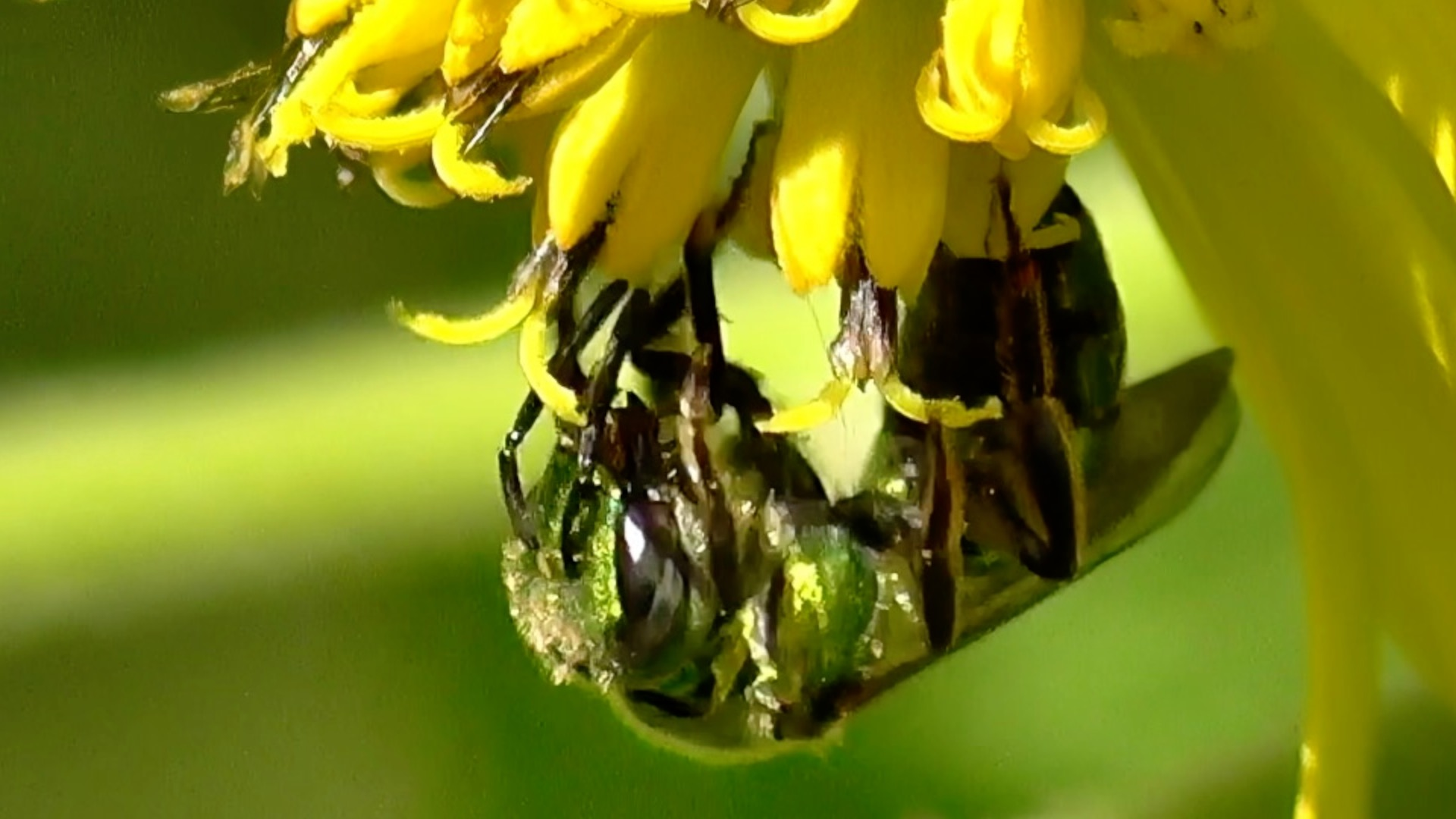
Image showing forked tongue of this A. pura.

Augochlora pura forages on a variety of flowers, including more inconspicuous flowers like walnut. They have been observed visiting over 40 distinct species. In the laboratory, A. pura even foraged for nectar, pollen, or both at foreign flowers not found near their natural habitat. A female collect pollen from up to ten flowers to provision a single cell, and these are often from different species. Males exhibit patrolling behavior. They fly between specific flowers, and maintain this route continuously with only short rests. They fly so quickly that they may be difficult to follow visually.

== Interactions with other species ==
Inside rotten logs, A. pura has been seen to associate with nests of another bee species, Lasioglossum coeruleum.

A. pura utilize the powdered wood produced by passalid beetles when constructing their nests.

Many A. pura found dead in the spring are covered with the fungus Fusarium. It is unclear whether the fungus was actually the cause of death.

Parasitic nematodes of the species Aduncospiculum halicti have been discovered in the Dufour's gland and genital tract of both males and females.
