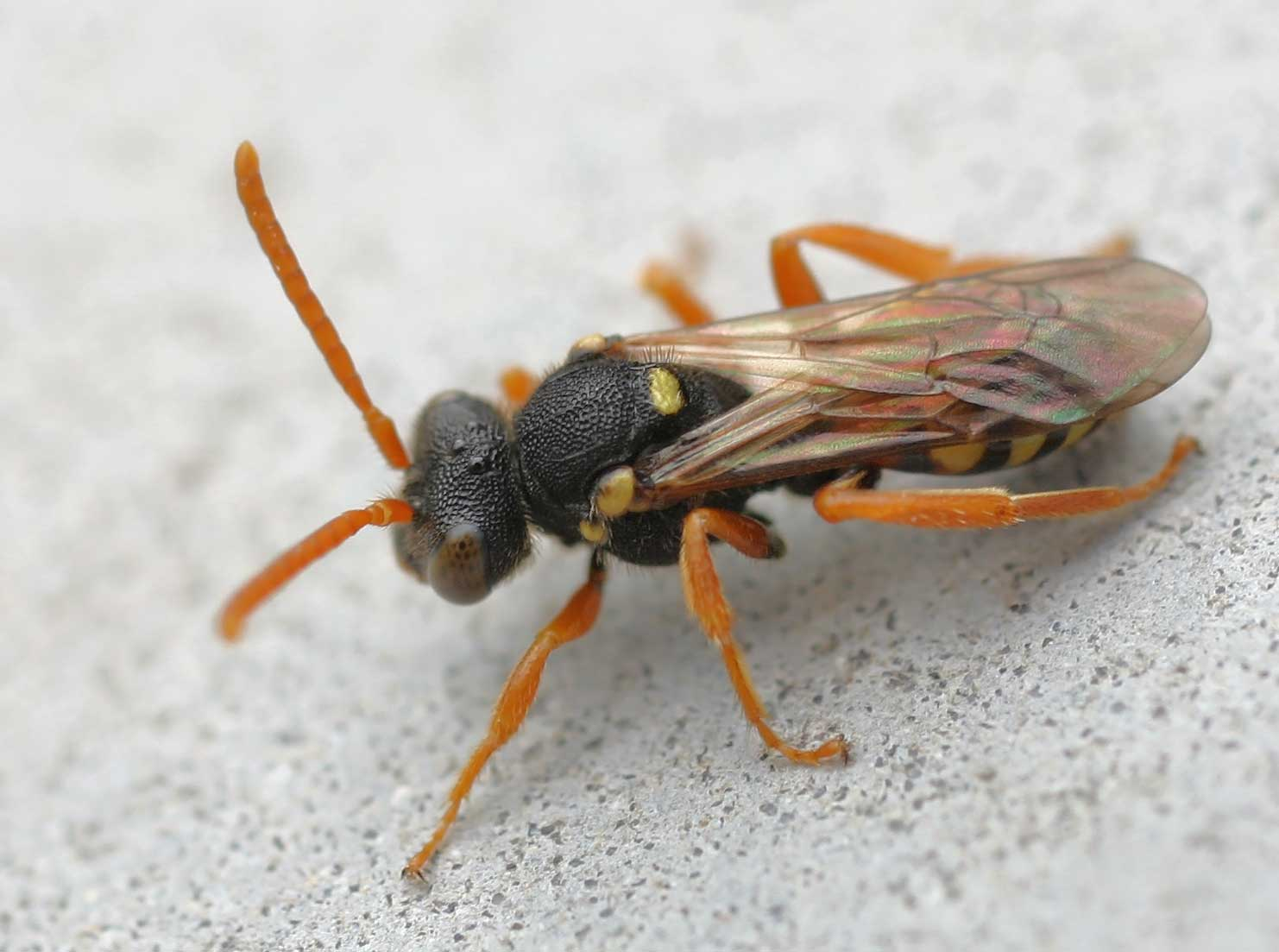
- Nomada fulvicornis

Scientific classification
- Kingdom: Animalia
- Phylum: Arthropoda
- Class: Insecta
- Order: Hymenoptera
- Family: Apidae
- Subfamily: Nomadinae; Latreille, 1802

Tribes
- Ammobatini; Ammobatoidini; Brachynomadini; Caenoprosopidini; Epeolini; Hexepeolini; Neolarrini; Nomadini

= Nomadinae =

Subfamily of bees

Nomadinae is a subfamily of bees in the family Apidae. They are known commonly as cuckoo bees.

This subfamily is entirely kleptoparasitic. They occur worldwide, and use many different types of bees as hosts. As parasites, they lack a pollen-carrying scopa, and are often extraordinarily wasp-like in appearance. All known species share the behavioral trait of females entering host nests when the host is absent, and inserting their eggs into the wall of the host cell; the larval parasite emerges later, after the cell has been closed by the host female, and kills the host larva. The first-instar larvae of nomadines are specially adapted for this, and possess long mandibles they use to kill the host larva, though these mandibles are lost as soon as the larva molts to the second instar, at which point it simply feeds on the pollen/nectar provisions. A behavioral habit shared by adults of various genera with males of many other bee species, who also do not possess a nest to return to, is that they frequently rest while grasping onto plant stems or leaves with only their mandibles.

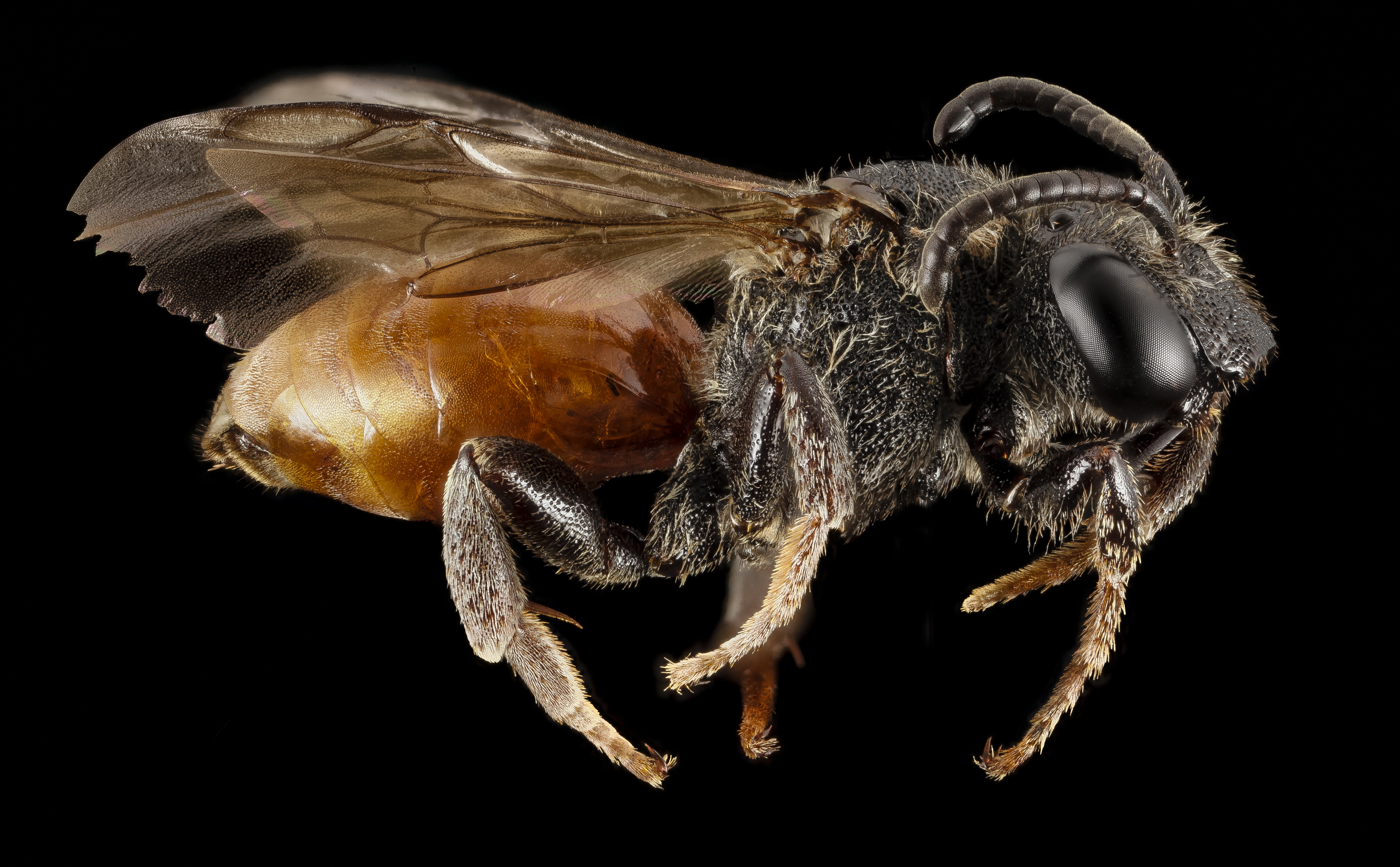
Ammobates muticus

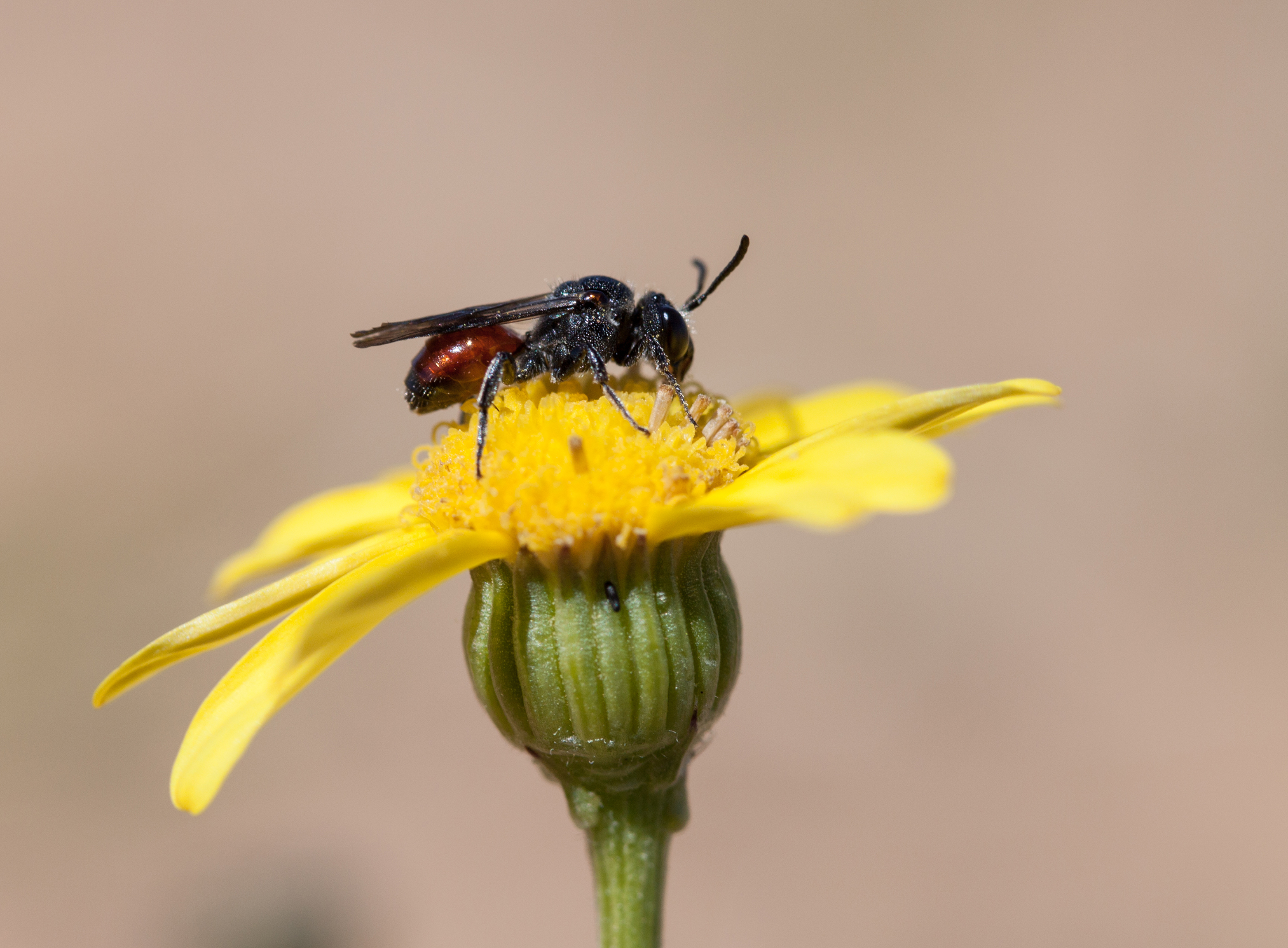
Sphecodopsis sp. in South Africa

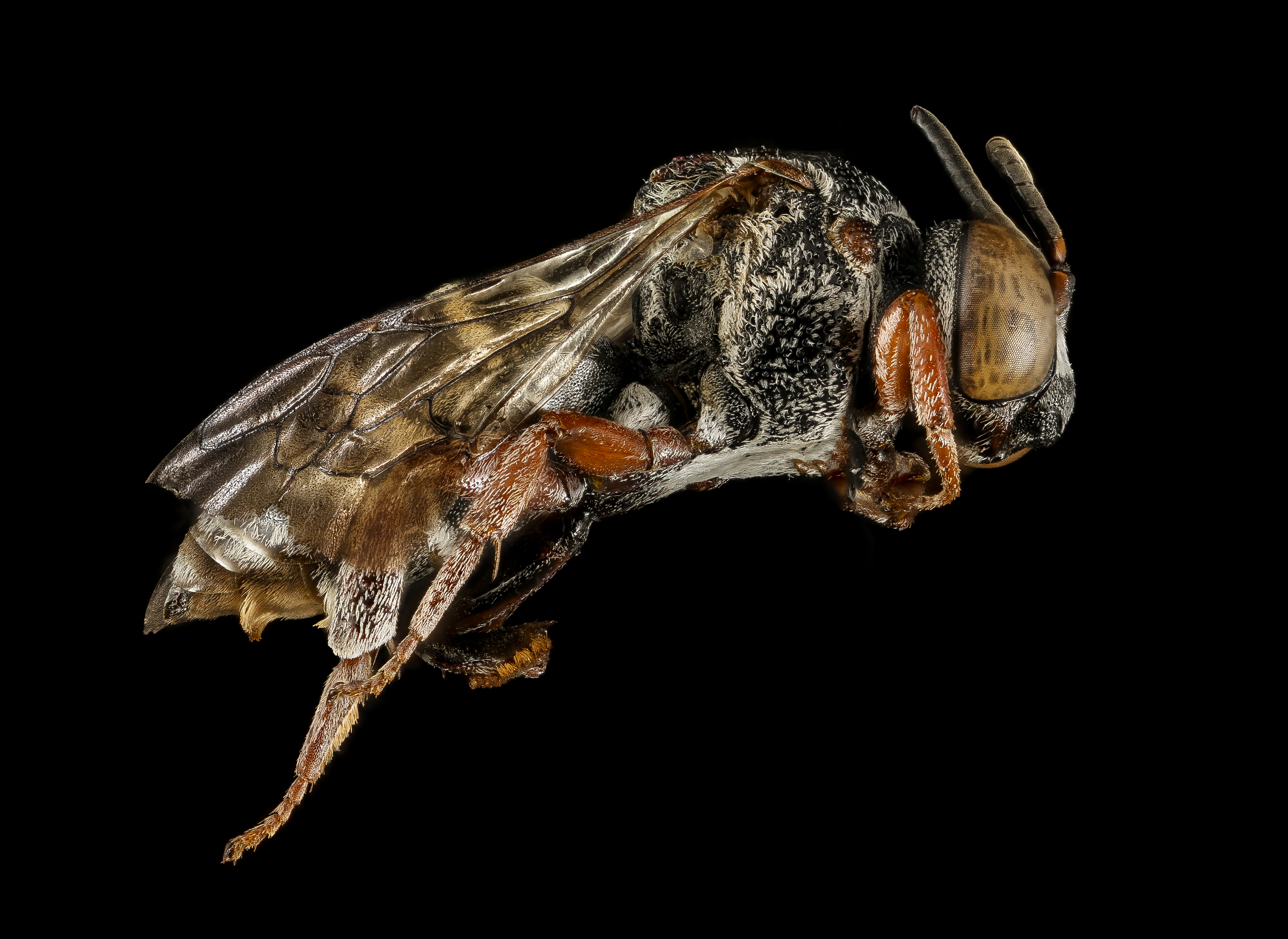
Epeolus lectoides

== Systematics ==
Tribes and genera include:

- Tribe Ammobatini
  - Ammobates
  - Chiasmognathus
  - Melanempis
  - Oreopasites
  - Parammobatodes
  - Pasites
  - Sphecodopsis
  - Spinopasites
- Tribe Ammobatoidini
  - Aethammobates
  - Ammobatoides
  - Holcopasites
  - Schmiedeknechtia
- Tribe Brachynomadini
  - Brachynomada
  - Kelita
  - Paranomada
  - Trichonomada
  - Triopasites
- Tribe Caenoprosopidini
  - Caenoprosopina
  - Caenoprosopis
- Tribe Epeolini
  - Doeringiella
  - Epeolus
  - Odyneropsis
  - Pseudepeolus
  - Rhinepeolus
  - Rhogepeolus
  - Thalestria
  - Triepeolus
- Tribe Hexepeolini
  - Hexepeolus
- Tribe Neolarrini
  - Biastes
  - Neolarra
  - Neopasites
  - Rhopalolemma
  - Schwarzia
  - Townsendiella
- Tribe Nomadini
  - Nomada
