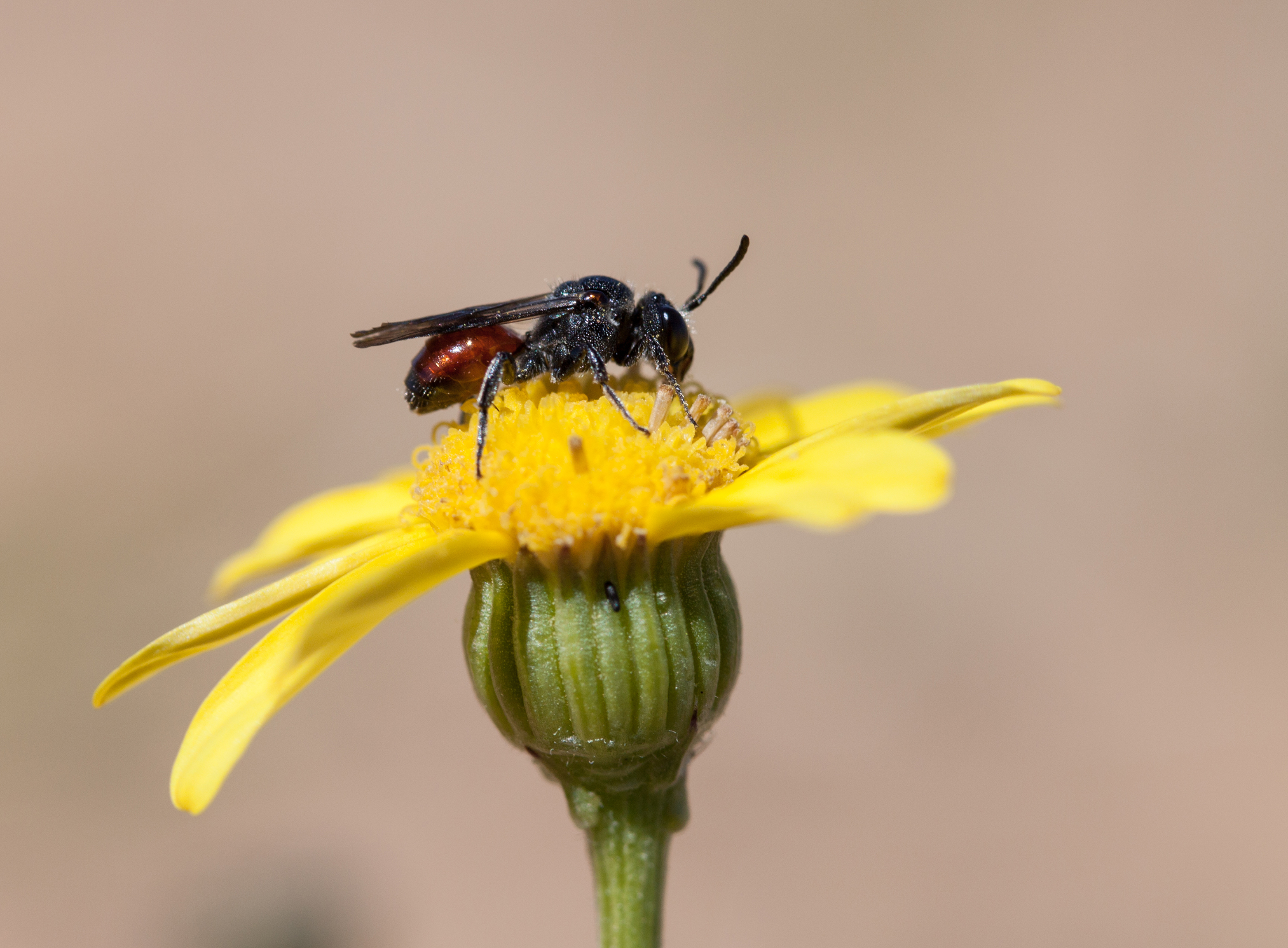

Scientific classification
- Kingdom: Animalia
- Phylum: Arthropoda
- Class: Insecta
- Order: Hymenoptera
- Family: Apidae
- Tribe: Ammobatini
- Genus: Sphecodopsis; Bischoff, 1923

Species
- See text

= Sphecodopsis =

Genus of bees

Sphecodopsis is a genus of cleptoparasitic cuckoo bees in the family Apidae. Endemic to southern Africa, the wasp-like bees of this genus are generally small, varying from 3.9 to 9 mm (0.15 to 0.35 in) in length, and mostly black, with orange-ish or reddish colouring of the metasoma in some of the species. The bee genus Scrapter is recognised as a host for the cleptoparasitic life cycle of some Sphecodopsis, but further data regarding preferred hosts is not available for most of the species.

== Taxonomy ==
German entomologist Hans Bischoff first described the genus in 1923 in the work "Kenntnis afrikanischer Schmarotzerbienen", published in the Deutsche entomologische Zeitschrift. The genus name is Greek for "wasp-like", with "spheco-" meaning wasp.

Of the fourteen currently recognised species, several of them were originally described under a different genus and have subsequently been included in Sphecodopsis. Some of the species in the genus are generally still poorly defined, owing to the lack of collection and study of specimens of both sexes.

The type species assigned to Sphecodopsis by Bischoff is S. capicola, originally designated Omachthes capicola in 1911 by Embrik Strand.

== Distribution and habitat ==
Most species in the genus are found exclusively in South Africa; only two of the species are known to have a range that extends to the greater part of southern Africa. This distribution pattern is not overly significant or surprising considering that South Africa, with its diverse climate, topography, and areas of reliably high rainfall, accounts for over 50% of all Afrotropical bee genera.

Preferred habitats of Sphecodopsis vary from species to species, though a significant proportion of them are concentrated in the Namaqualand region and the Western Cape. Areas of reliable high seasonal rainfall are popular with the bees, owing in part to the abundance of flora and to the associated prosperity of pollen-collecting bees whose nests may be used as hosts for their larvae.

== Morphology ==
The bees are overall very wasp-like in appearance, lacking scopae and being slender and far less hairy than many non-cleptoparasitic bees. The colouration of the metasoma is also more typical of wasps. The lack of pollen-collecting scopae is an evolutionary loss of structure that is common to almost all cleptoparastic bees as they have no need to gather pollen, nor nests in which to store it.

Species in this genus vary from 3.9 to 9 mm (0.15 to 0.35 in) in size, considered small for bees. The head and the mesosoma are always black, although there may be orange or red colouration of mouthparts, antennae, or legs. The metasoma is black in some of the species but orange or red, to various degrees, in the others. Hairs, sometimes plumose, are either white or black. In profile the scutellum is curved evenly and gently. The antennae of the females have 12 segments and those of males have 13. The tergum of both males and females lacks a pygidial plate. In the tribe Ammobatini the labrum is longer than it is broad, which is an unusual characteristic in Apidae, and in Sphecodopsis specifically the labrum is also apically pointed.

The eggs and the larvae of two species of Sphecodopsis, S. capensis and S. fumipennis, have been thoroughly described, while larval information for the other species remains mostly unstudied or unpublished. Eggs are smaller than the size of the adult suggests, whitish, and long with a gentle curve, narrowing to a rounded point. The first instar of the larva has a forked abdominal tip that allows it to crawl inside the nest cell. The head capsule is pigmented and its abdomen is slender. It possesses long sickle-shaped mandibles that enable it to destroy any other eggs or larvae in the cell. In the second instar the forked abdominal tip remains but the mandibles are much reduced, and the body extends laterally, presumably a flotation aid as food stores become gradually liquefied in the cell. This description applies to both of the species studied, and may be markedly different for other species in the genus, although certain features, such as strong mandibles for destroying competition in the cell, are presumably the same in design and function.

== Behaviour and life cycle ==
Females lay their small eggs in the nests of solitary bees that they have chosen as hosts. S. capensis and S. fumipennis females have been observed watching the entrance of a host's nest from a distance for up to thirty minutes, waiting until the host is absent before approaching to lay eggs. The eggs are laid so that the operculum is flush with the inside of the cell, and the rest of the egg hidden in the lining. Sphecodopsis females choose cells that are not yet sealed, so there is a chance the egg will be discovered by the host as it makes further provisions before sealing. After hatching, the first instar is active and predatory and kills with its mandibles any other eggs or larvae it finds inside the cell, including those of its siblings, if present. The subsequent instars are more similar to those of other bees and focused mainly on feeding on the provisions before pupation.

Little information is available regarding the plants that the adult Sphecodopsis prefers visiting. Where a floral record has been made, based on limited observations of only two species, the plant genera noted are Grielum, Helichrysum, Senecio, and Hemimeris.

== Species ==
- Sphecodopsis aculeata (Friese, 1922)
- Sphecodopsis argyrura (Cockerell, 1933)
- Sphecodopsis capensis (Friese, 1915)
- Sphecodopsis capicola (Strand, 1911)
- Sphecodopsis carolinae Eardley, 2007
- Sphecodopsis fumipennis (Bischoff, 1923)
- Sphecodopsis kuhlmanni Eardley, 2007
- Sphecodopsis longipygidium Eardley, 1997
- Sphecodopsis minutissima (Cockerell, 1933)
- Sphecodopsis namaquensis Eardley, 1997
- Sphecodopsis papilla Eardley, 2007
- Sphecodopsis semirufa (Cockerell, 1933)
- Sphecodopsis vespericena Eardley, 1997
- Sphecodopsis villosa (Friese, 1909)
