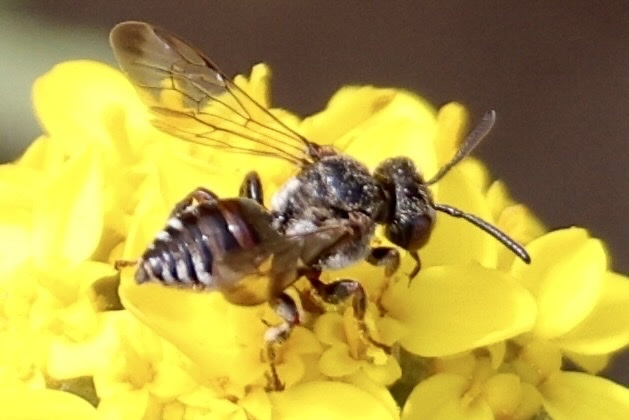

Scientific classification
- Kingdom: Animalia
- Phylum: Arthropoda
- Class: Insecta
- Order: Hymenoptera
- Family: Apidae
- Tribe: Brachynomadini
- Genus: Brachynomada
- Species: B. annectens

Binomial name
- Brachynomada annectens (Snelling & Rozen, 1987)

= Brachynomada annectens =

Species of bee

Brachynomada annectens is a species of cuckoo bee in the family Apidae. It is found in the United States and Mexico.
