= Holcopasites minimus =

Scientific classification
- Domain: Eukaryota
- Kingdom: Animalia
- Phylum: Arthropoda
- Class: Insecta
- Order: Hymenoptera
- Family: Apidae
- Tribe: Ammobatoidini
- Genus: Holcopasites
- Species: H. minimus

Binomial name
- Holcopasites minimus (Linsley, 1943)

Species of bee

Holcopasites minimus is a species of cuckoo bee in the family Apidae. It is found from Mexico to Canada.
