= Brachynomada margaretae =

Scientific classification
- Domain: Eukaryota
- Kingdom: Animalia
- Phylum: Arthropoda
- Class: Insecta
- Order: Hymenoptera
- Family: Apidae
- Tribe: Brachynomadini
- Genus: Brachynomada
- Species: B. margaretae

Binomial name
- Brachynomada margaretae (Rozen, 1994)

Species of bee

Brachynomada margaretae is a species of cuckoo bee in the family Apidae. It is found in the United States and Mexico.
