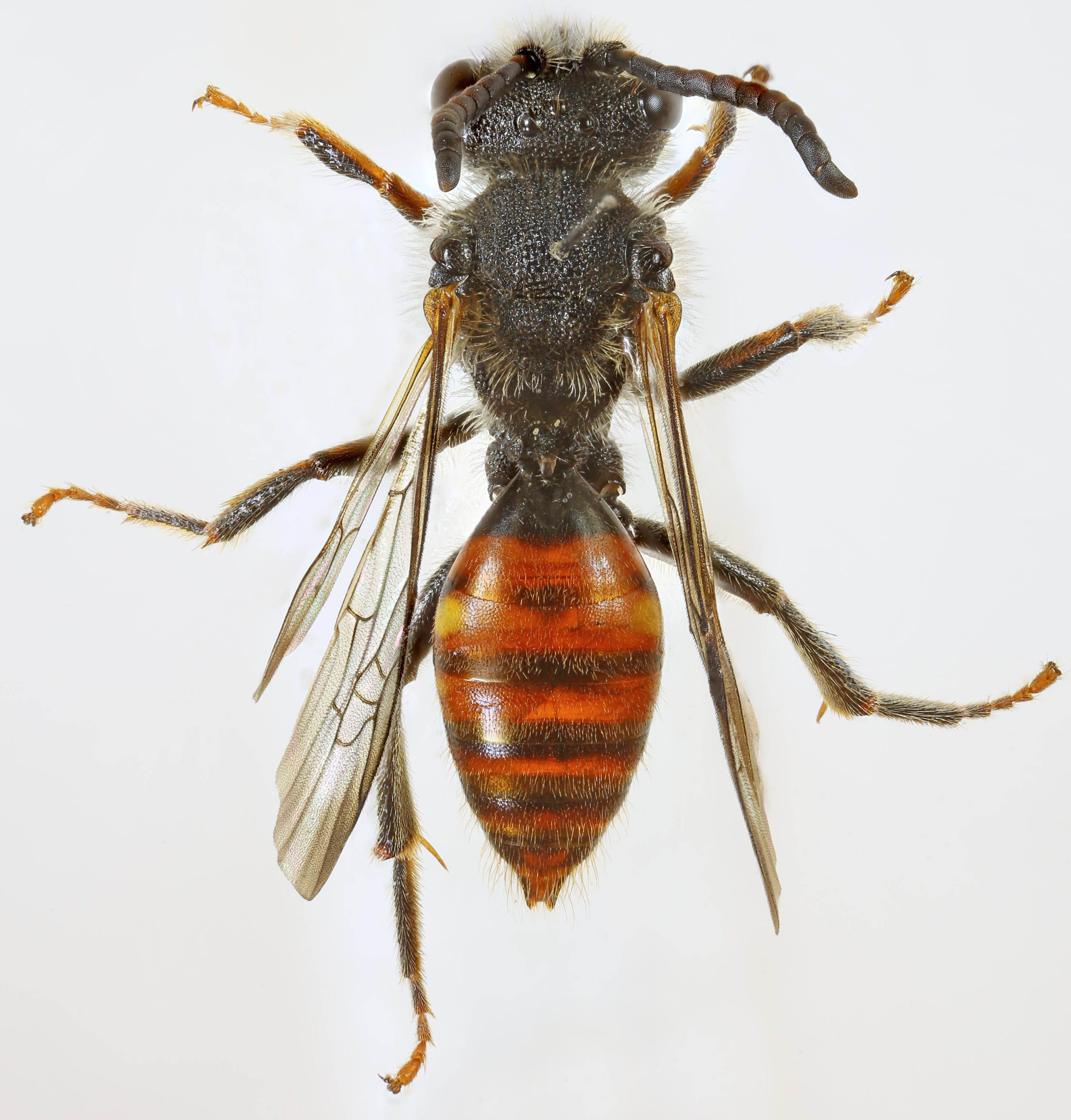
- Nomada fabriciana Minera, North Wales

Scientific classification
- Kingdom: Animalia
- Phylum: Arthropoda
- Clade: Pancrustacea
- Class: Insecta
- Order: Hymenoptera
- Family: Apidae
- Subfamily: Nomadinae
- Tribe: Nomadini
- Genus: Nomada
- Species: N. fabriciana

Binomial name
- Nomada fabriciana (Linnaeus, 1767)

= Nomada fabriciana =

Species of bee

Nomada fabriciana is a Palearctic species of nomad bee.
