= Oreopasites barbarae =

Scientific classification
- Domain: Eukaryota
- Kingdom: Animalia
- Phylum: Arthropoda
- Class: Insecta
- Order: Hymenoptera
- Family: Apidae
- Tribe: Ammobatini
- Genus: Oreopasites
- Species: O. barbarae

Binomial name
- Oreopasites barbarae Rozen, 1992

Species of bee

Oreopasites barbarae, or Barbara's oreopasites, is a species of cuckoo bee in the family Apidae. It is found in North America.
