= Brachynomada roigella =

Scientific classification
- Domain: Eukaryota
- Kingdom: Animalia
- Phylum: Arthropoda
- Class: Insecta
- Order: Hymenoptera
- Family: Apidae
- Subfamily: Nomadinae
- Tribe: Brachynomadini
- Genus: Brachynomada
- Species: B. roigella

Binomial name
- Brachynomada roigella (Michener, 1996)

Synonyms
- Trichonomada roigella Michener, 1996

Species of bees

Brachynomada roigella is a species of cuckoo bees in the family Apidae.
