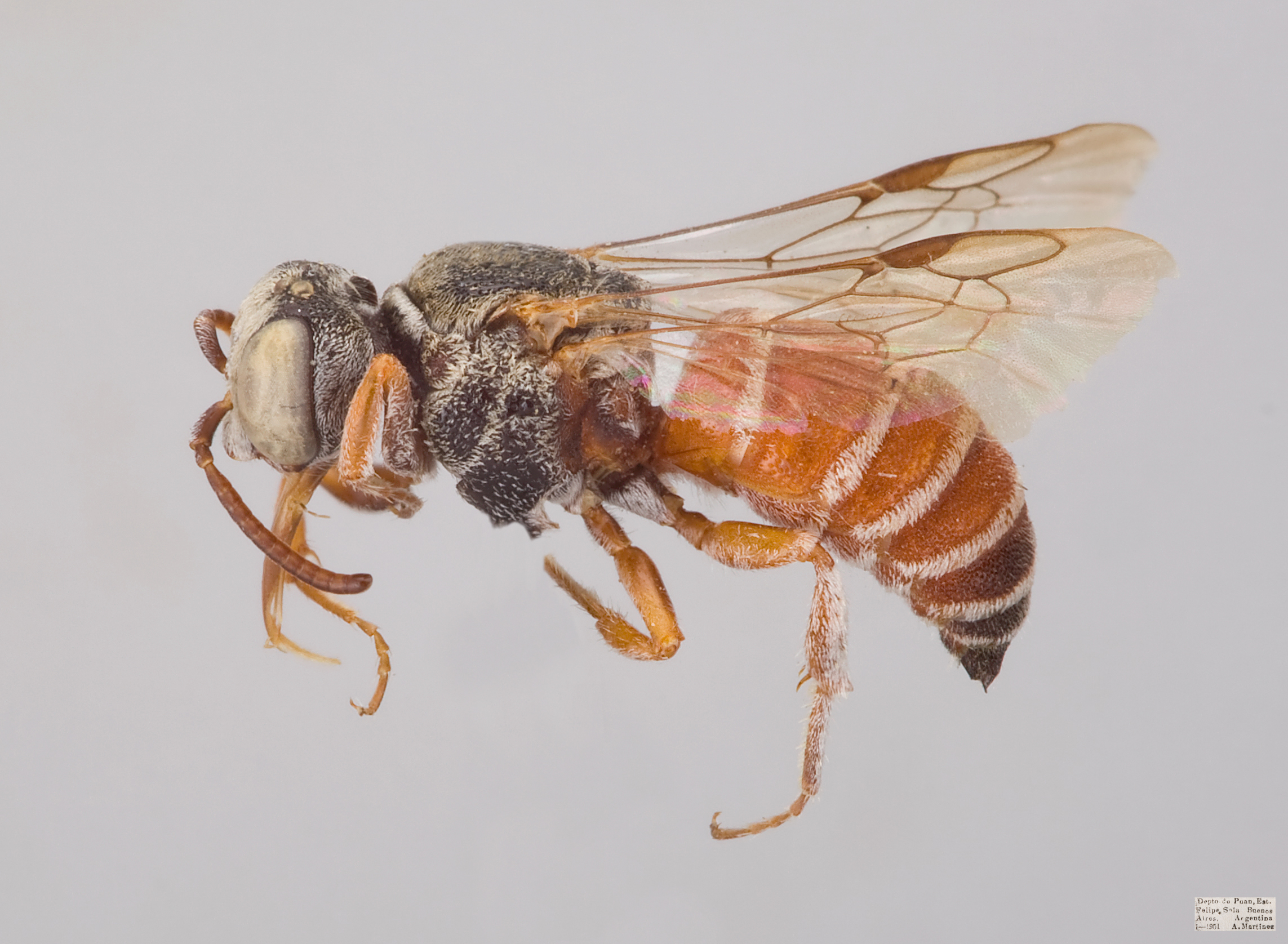
- Caenoprosopis crabronina

Scientific classification
- Domain: Eukaryota
- Kingdom: Animalia
- Phylum: Arthropoda
- Class: Insecta
- Order: Hymenoptera
- Family: Apidae
- Subfamily: Nomadinae
- Tribe: Caenoprosopidini; Michener, 1944

= Caenoprosopidini =

Tribe of insects

Caenoprosopidini is a tribe of bees found in South America. The clade is a sister group to the tribe Ammobatini.

== Taxonomy ==
There are two genera in the tribe Caenoprosopidini:

- Caenoprosopis - monotypic (Caenoprosopis crabronina)
- Caenoprospina - monotypic (Caenoprospina holmbergi)
