= Kelita =

Kelita may refer to:

- Kelita (biblical figure), minor character from the Old Testament
- Kelita (bee), a genus of bees in the family Apidae
- Kelita, a former genus of flowering plants, synonym of Ptilotus
