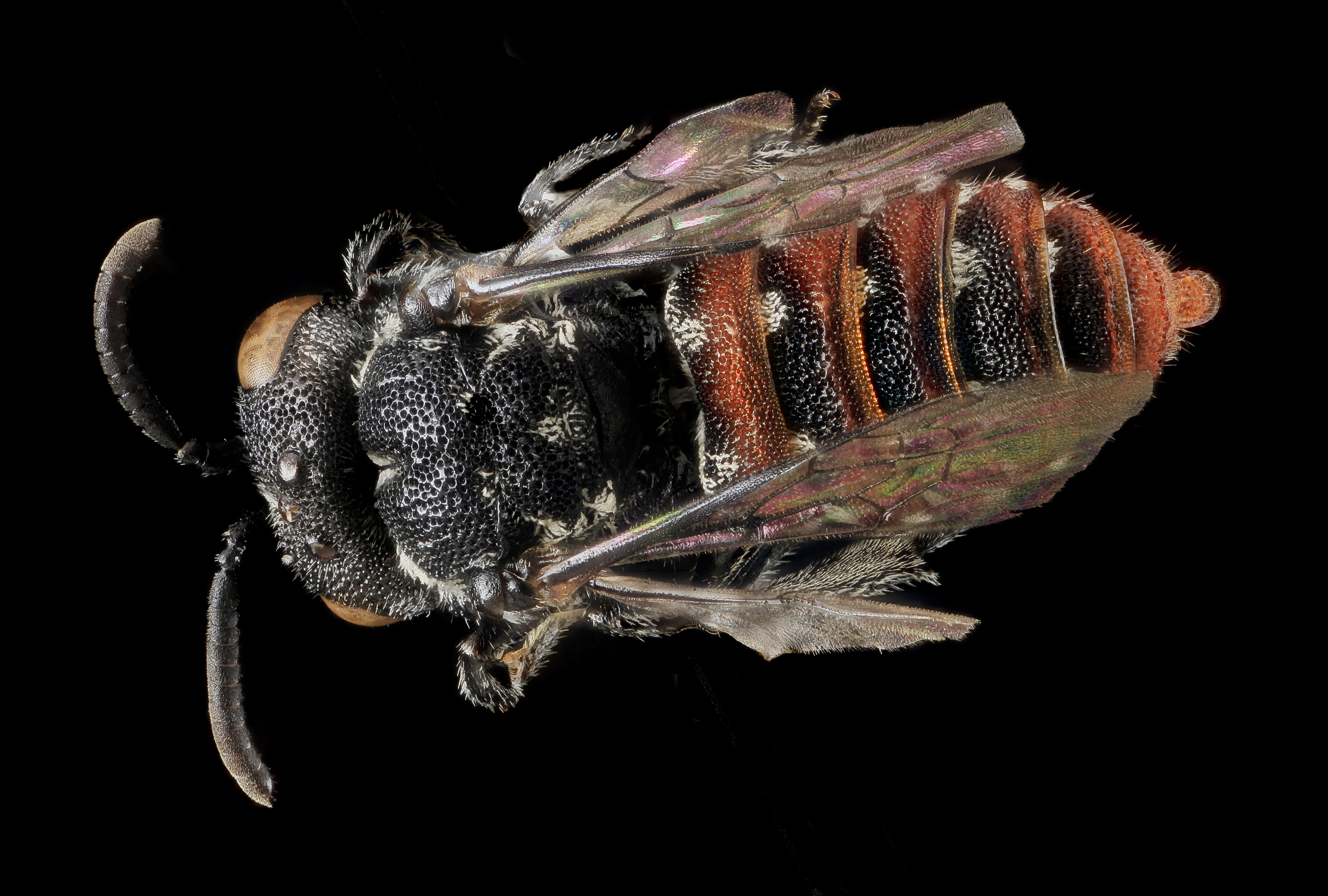
- Holcopasites calliopsidis

Scientific classification
- Domain: Eukaryota
- Kingdom: Animalia
- Phylum: Arthropoda
- Class: Insecta
- Order: Hymenoptera
- Family: Apidae
- Subfamily: Nomadinae
- Tribe: Ammobatoidini

= Ammobatoidini =

Tribe of bees

Ammobatoidini is a tribe of cuckoo bees in the family Apidae. There are at least 4 genera and 30 described species in Ammobatoidini.

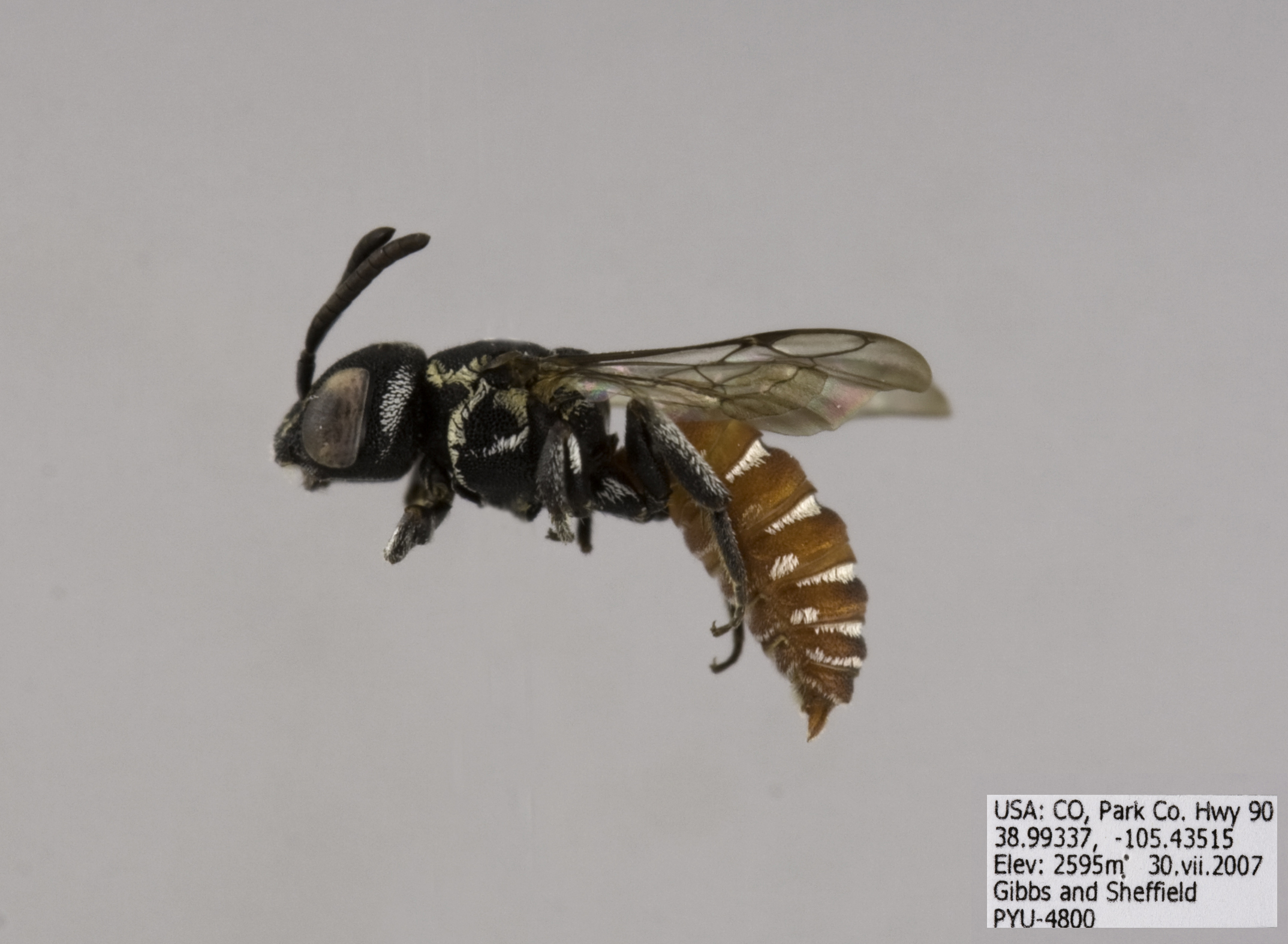
Holcopasites stevensi

== Genera ==
- Aethammobates Baker, 1994
- Ammobatoides Radoszkowski, 1867
- Holcopasites Ashmead, 1899
- Schmiedeknechtia Friese, 1896
