= Ammobates dusmeti =

Conservation status
- Critically Endangered (IUCN 3.1)

Scientific classification
- Kingdom: Animalia
- Phylum: Arthropoda
- Class: Insecta
- Order: Hymenoptera
- Family: Apidae
- Genus: Ammobates
- Species: A. dusmeti

Binomial name
- Ammobates dusmeti (Popov, 1951)

Species of bee

Ammobates dusmeti is a species of bee in the family Apidae. The species is recorded in Spain and France.
