= Triopasites penniger =

Scientific classification
- Kingdom: Animalia
- Phylum: Arthropoda
- Class: Insecta
- Order: Hymenoptera
- Family: Apidae
- Genus: Triopasites
- Species: T. penniger

Binomial name
- Triopasites penniger (Cockerell, 1894)

Species of bee

Triopasites penniger is a species of cuckoo bee in the family Apidae. It is found in the United States and Mexico.
