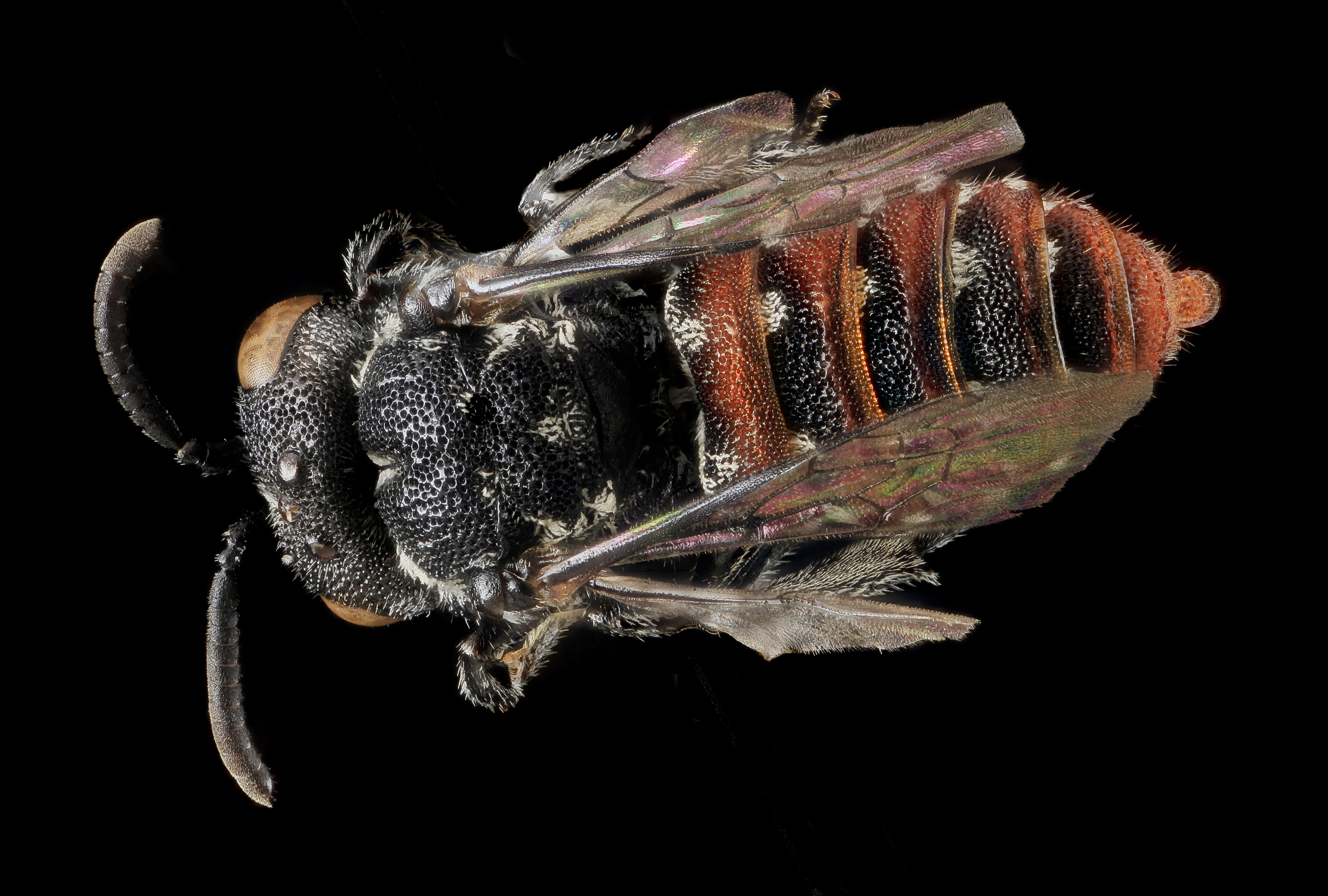

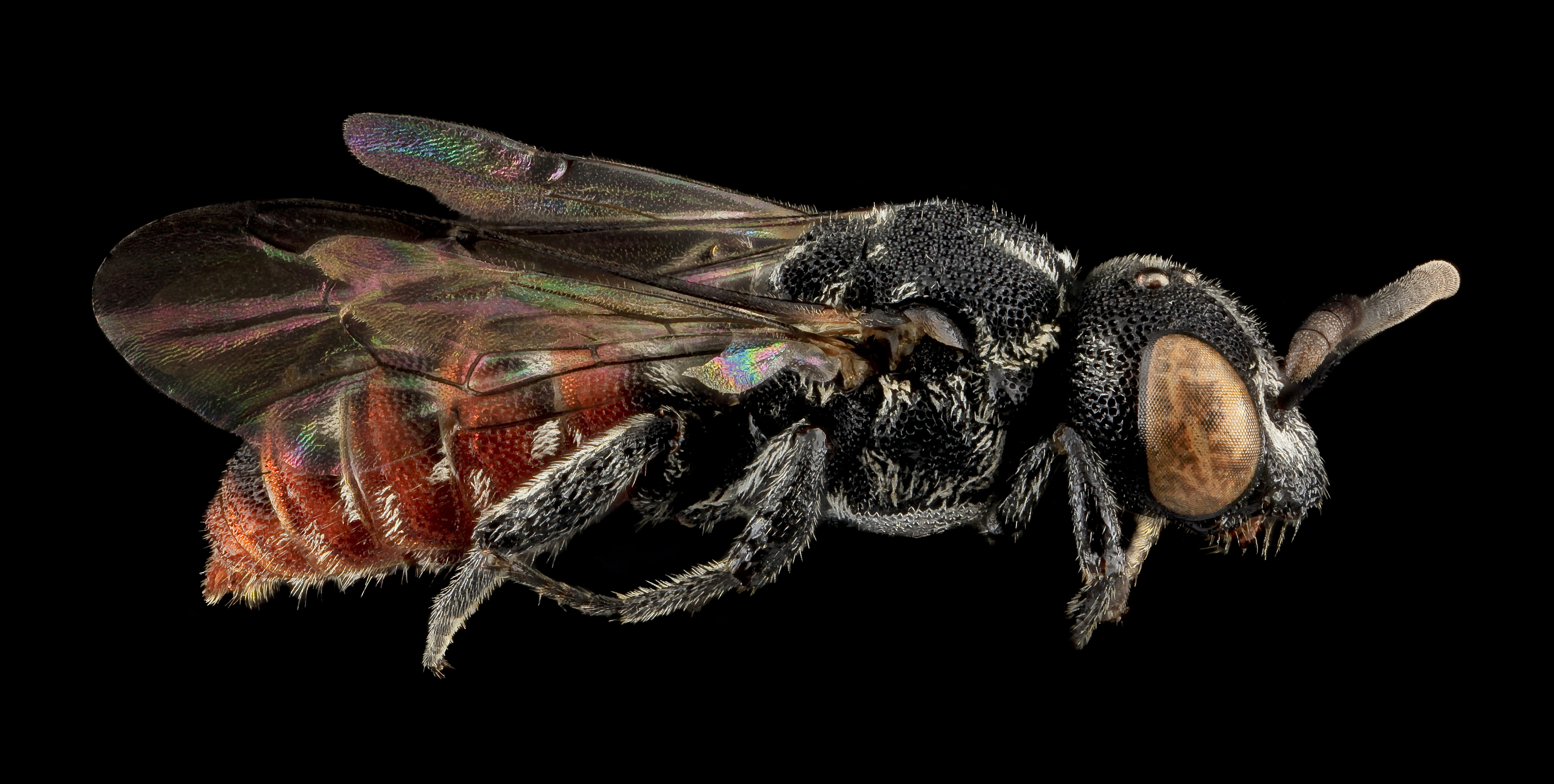
- Male

Scientific classification
- Domain: Eukaryota
- Kingdom: Animalia
- Phylum: Arthropoda
- Class: Insecta
- Order: Hymenoptera
- Family: Apidae
- Genus: Holcopasites
- Species: H. calliopsidis

Binomial name
- Holcopasites calliopsidis (Linsley, 1943)

= Holcopasites calliopsidis =

Species of bee

Holcopasites calliopsidis is a species of cuckoo bee in the family Apidae. It is found from Mexico to Canada.

Holcopasites calliopsidis measure 5–6 mm (0.20–0.24 in) in length.

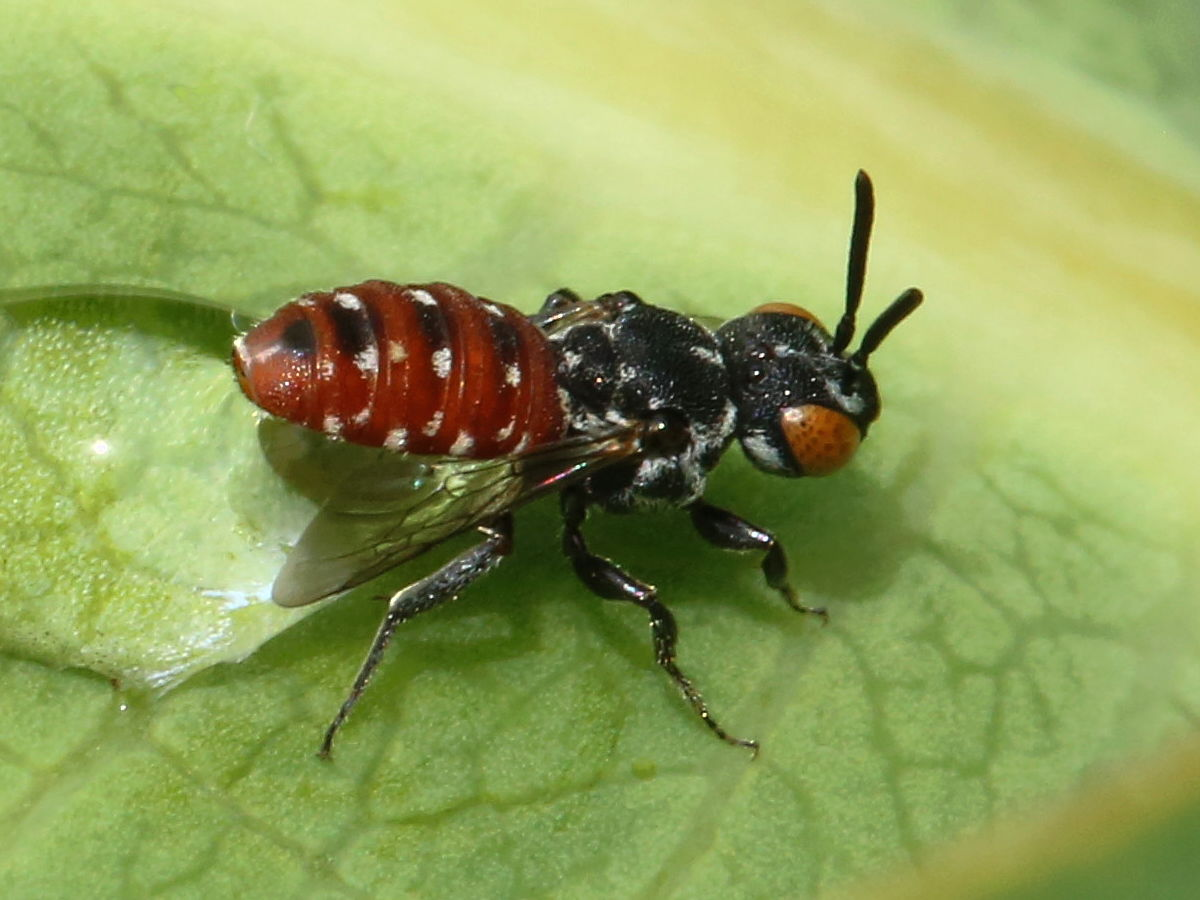
Female

== Hosts ==
H. calliopsidis is a known cleptoparasite of Calliopsis andreniformis. Pseudopanurgus sp. may also be hosts of H. calliopsidis.

== Subspecies ==
- Holcopasites calliopsidis calliopsidis (Linsley, 1943)
- Holcopasites calliopsidis carinatus (Linsley, 1943)
