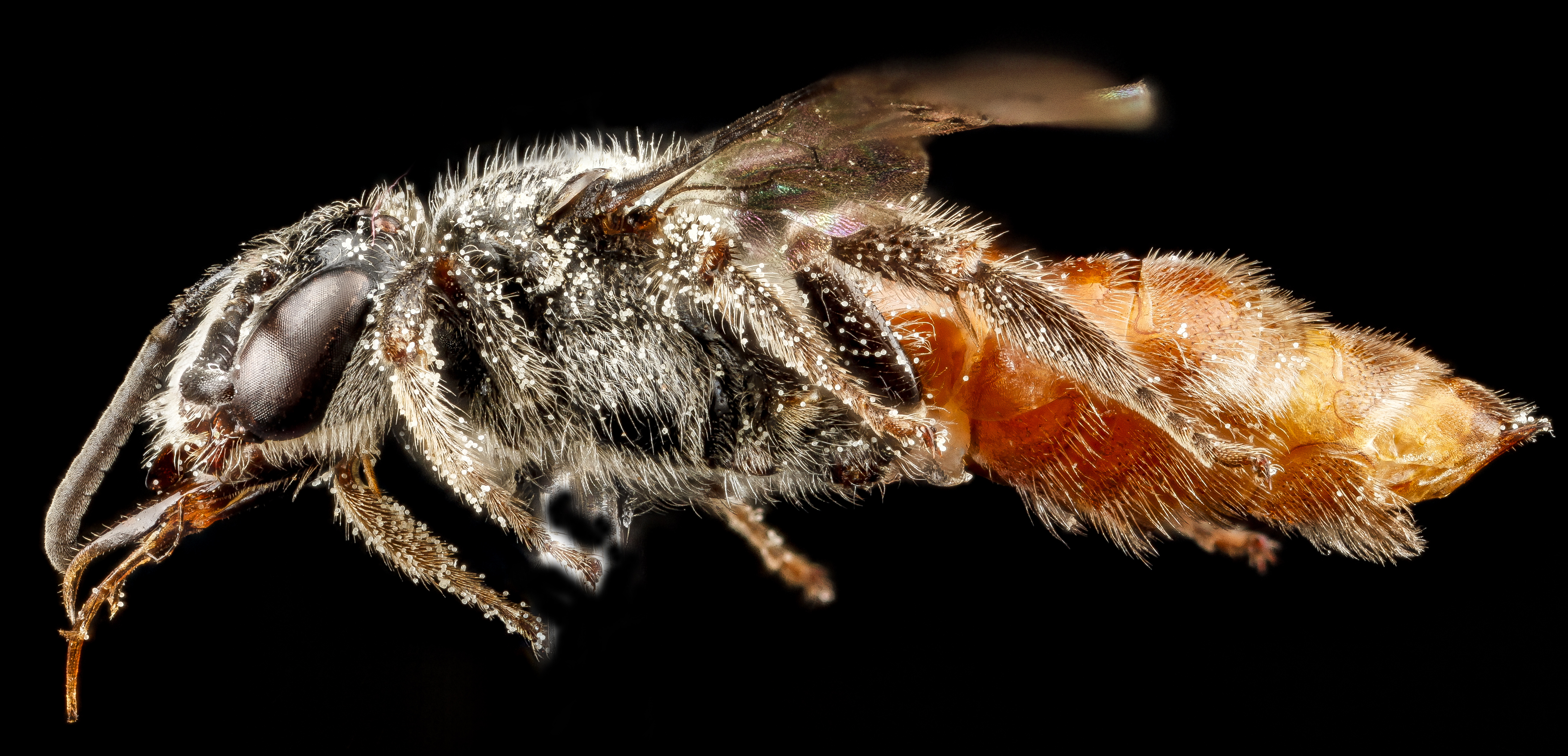
- Brachynomada grindeliae

Scientific classification
- Domain: Eukaryota
- Kingdom: Animalia
- Phylum: Arthropoda
- Class: Insecta
- Order: Hymenoptera
- Family: Apidae
- Subfamily: Nomadinae
- Tribe: Brachynomadini
- Genus: Brachynomada; Holmberg, 1886

Synonyms
- Trichonomada Michener, 1996

= Brachynomada =

Genus of bees

Brachynomada is a genus of cuckoo bees in the family Apidae. There are about 16 described species in Brachynomada.

== Species ==
- Brachynomada annectens (Snelling & Rozen, 1987)
- Brachynomada argentina Holmberg, 1886
- Brachynomada bigibbosa (Friese, 1908)
- Brachynomada cearensis (Ducke, 1911)
- Brachynomada chacoensis Holmberg, 1886
- Brachynomada chica (Snelling & Rozen, 1987)
- Brachynomada grindeliae (Cockerell, 1903)
- Brachynomada margaretae (Rozen, 1994)
- Brachynomada melanantha (Linsley, 1939)
- Brachynomada nimia (Snelling & Rozen, 1987)
- Brachynomada roigella (Michener, 1996)
- Brachynomada roigi Rozen, 1994
- Brachynomada scotti Rozen, 1997
- Brachynomada sidaefloris (Cockerell, 1898)
- Brachynomada thoracica (Friese, 1908)
- Brachynomada tomentifera (Ducke, 1907)
