= Oreopasites =

Scientific classification
- Kingdom: Animalia
- Phylum: Arthropoda
- Clade: Pancrustacea
- Class: Insecta
- Order: Hymenoptera
- Family: Apidae
- Subfamily: Nomadinae
- Tribe: Ammobatini
- Genus: Oreopasites; Cockerell, 1906

Genus of bees

Oreopasites is a genus of cuckoo bees in the family Apidae. There are about 11 described species in Oreopasites.

== Species ==
These 11 species belong to the genus Oreopasites:

- Oreopasites albinota Linsley, 1941
- Oreopasites arizonica Linsley, 1941
- Oreopasites barbarae Rozen, 1992 (Barbara's oreopasites)
- Oreopasites collegarum Rozen, 1992
- Oreopasites euphorbiae Cockerell, 1929
- Oreopasites favreauae Rozen, 1992
- Oreopasites hurdi Rozen, 1992
- Oreopasites linsleyi Rozen, 1992
- Oreopasites powelli Rozen, 1992
- Oreopasites scituli Cockerell, 1906
- Oreopasites vanduzeei Cockerell, 1925
