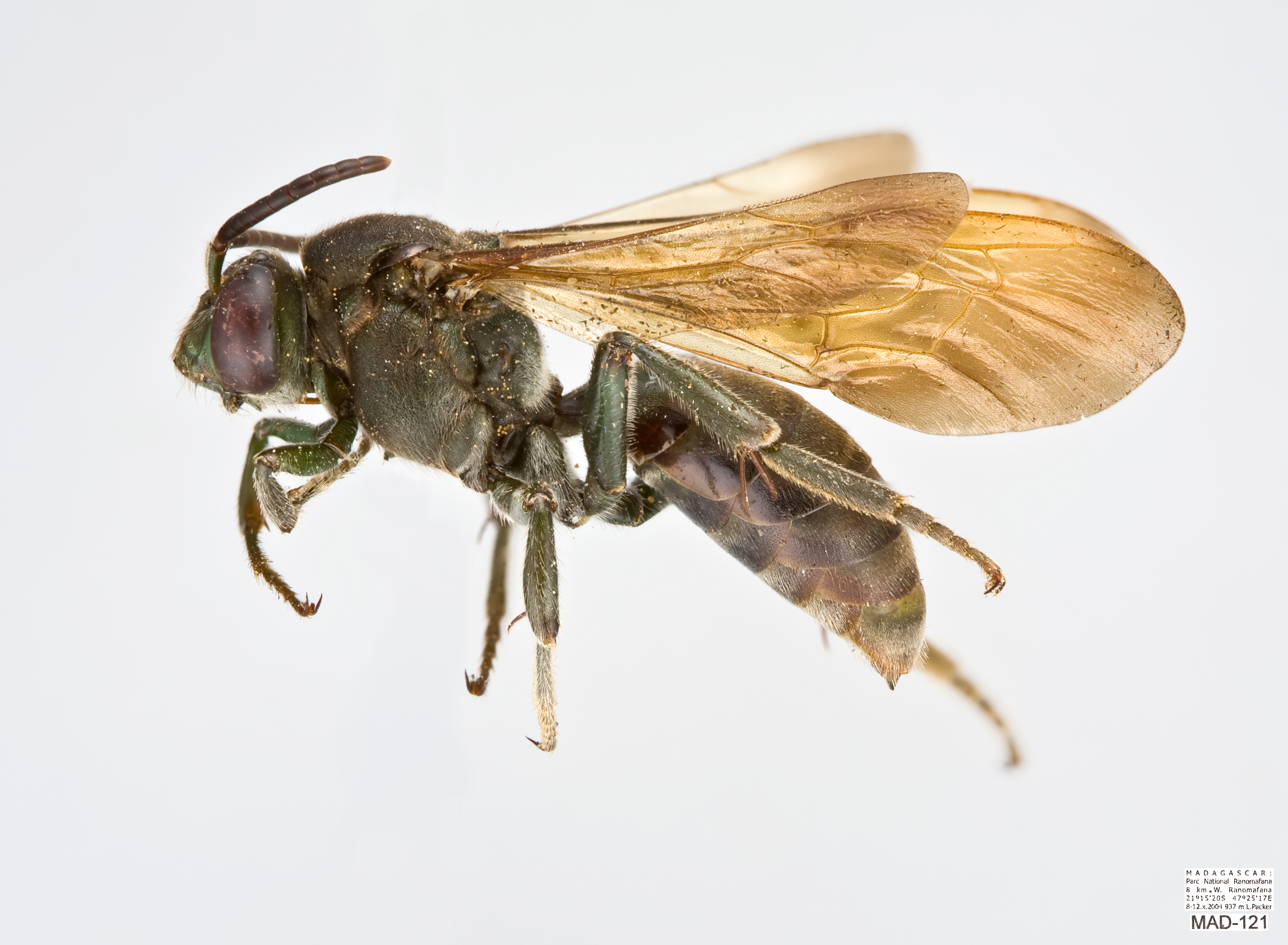
- Melanempis scoliiformis

Scientific classification
- Domain: Eukaryota
- Kingdom: Animalia
- Phylum: Arthropoda
- Class: Insecta
- Order: Hymenoptera
- Family: Apidae
- Tribe: Ammobatini
- Genus: Melanempis; Saussure, 1890

= Melanempis =

Genus of bees

Melanempis is a genus of cuckoo bees belonging to the family Apidae.

All of the species of this genus are endemic species of Madagascar. Melanempis atra was described by Saussure in 1890, the remains four species were discovered by Brooks & Pauly in 2001.

Species:

- Melanempis atra (Saussure, 1890)
- Melanempis eremnochlora Brooks & Pauly, 2001
- Melanempis fulva Brooks & Pauly, 2001
- Melanempis scoliiformis Brooks & Pauly, 2001
- Melanempis seyrigi Brooks & Pauly, 2001
