= Parammobatodes =

Scientific classification
- Domain: Eukaryota
- Kingdom: Animalia
- Phylum: Arthropoda
- Class: Insecta
- Order: Hymenoptera
- Family: Apidae
- Tribe: Ammobatini
- Genus: Parammobatodes; Popov, 1931

Genus of bees

Parammobatodes is a genus of cuckoo bees belonging to the family Apidae.

The species of this genus are found in Middle East, Europe, and South Asia.

Species:

- Parammobatodes craterus (Engel, 2008)
- Parammobatodes indicus (Cockerell, 1919)
- Parammobatodes maroccanus Warncke, 1983
- Parammobatodes minutus (Mocsáry, 1878)
- Parammobatodes nuristanus (Warncke, 1983)
- Parammobatodes rozeni Schwarz, 2003
