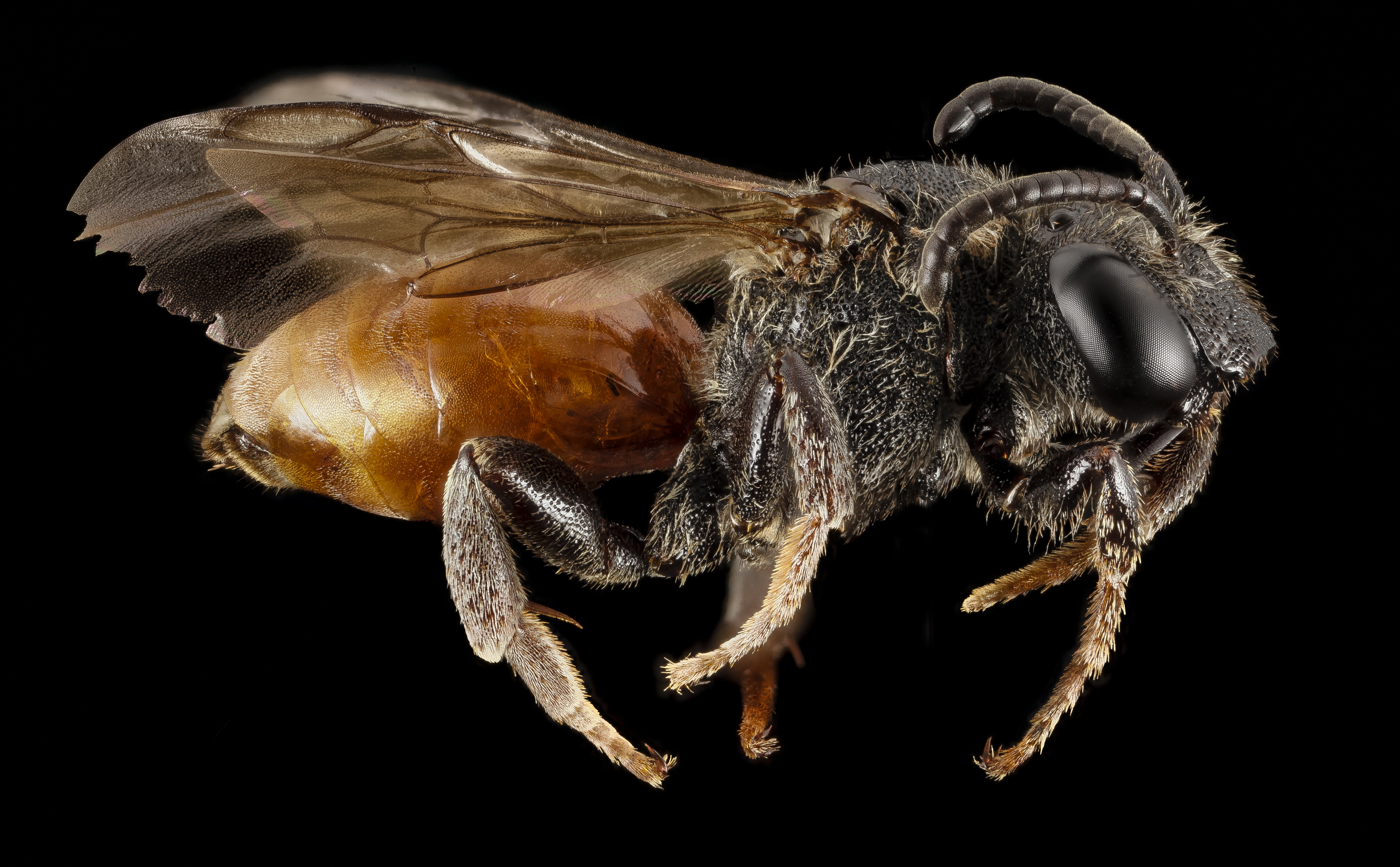
- Ammobates muticus

Scientific classification
- Domain: Eukaryota
- Kingdom: Animalia
- Phylum: Arthropoda
- Class: Insecta
- Order: Hymenoptera
- Family: Apidae
- Tribe: Ammobatini
- Genus: Ammobates; Latreille, 1809

= Ammobates =

Genus of insects

Ammobates is a genus of cuckoo bees belonging to the family Apidae.

The species of this genus are found in Europe, Africa and South America.

Species:

- Ammobates ancylae (Warncke, 1983)
- Ammobates armeniacus (Morawitz, 1876)
- Ammobates arsinoe (Engel, 2009)
- Ammobates assimilis (Warncke, 1983)
- Ammobates atrorufus (Warncke, 1983)
- Ammobates aurantiacus (Popov, 1951)
- Ammobates auster (Eardley, 1997)
- Ammobates baueri (Warncke, 1983)
- Ammobates biastoides (Friese, 1895)
- Ammobates buteus (Warncke, 1983)
- Ammobates carinatus (Morawitz, 1872)
- Ammobates chinospilus (Baker, 1974)
- Ammobates cinnamomeus (Engel, 2008)
- Ammobates cockerelli (Popov, 1951)
- Ammobates depressus (Friese, 1911)
- Ammobates dubius (Benoist, 1961)
- Ammobates dusmeti (Popov, 1951)
- Ammobates handlirschi (Friese, 1895)
- Ammobates hipponensis (Pérez, 1902)
- Ammobates iranicus (Warncke, 1983)
- Ammobates latitarsis (Friese, 1899)
- Ammobates lativalvis (Popov, 1951)
- Ammobates lebedevi (Popov, 1951)
- Ammobates major (Pérez, 1902)
- Ammobates mavromoustakisi (Popov, 1944)
- Ammobates maxschwarzi (Engel, 2008
- Ammobates minor (Pérez, 1902)
- Ammobates minutissimus (Mavromoustakis, 1959)
- Ammobates monticolus (Warncake, 1985)
- Ammobates muticus (Spinola, 1843)
- Ammobates nigrinus (Morawitz, 1875)
- Ammobates niveatus (Spinola, 1838)
- Ammobates obscuratus (Morawitz, 1894)
- Ammobates opacus (Popov, 1951)
- Ammobates oraniensis (Lepeletier, 1841)
- Ammobates oxianus (Popov, 1951)
- Ammobates persicus (Mavromoustakis, 1968)
- Ammobates punctatus (Fabricius, 1804)
- Ammobates robustus (Friese, 1899)
- Ammobates roseus (Morawitz, 1895)
- Ammobates rostratus (Friese, 1899)
- Ammobates rufiventris (Latreille, 1809)
- Ammobates sanguineus (Friese, 1911)
- Ammobates similis (Mocsáry, 1894)
- Ammobates solitarius (Nurse, 1904)
- Ammobates syriacus (Friese, 1899)
- Ammobates teheranicus (Mavromoustakis, 1968)
- Ammobates turanicus (Popov, 1951)
- Ammobates verhoeffi (Mavromoustakis, 1959)
- Ammobates vinctus (Gerstäcker, 1869)
