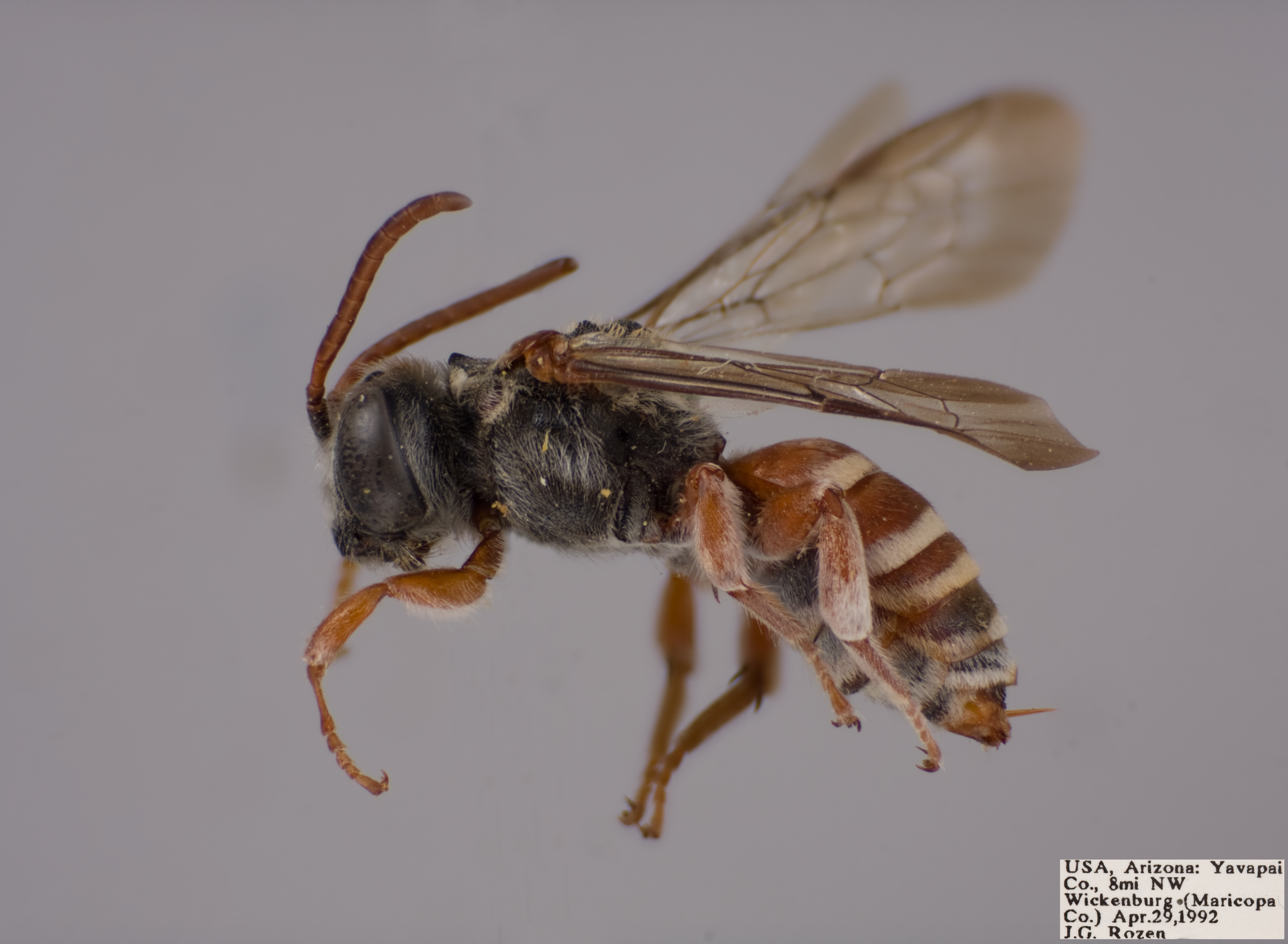
- Hexepeolus rhodogyne

Scientific classification
- Domain: Eukaryota
- Kingdom: Animalia
- Phylum: Arthropoda
- Class: Insecta
- Order: Hymenoptera
- Family: Apidae
- Subfamily: Nomadinae
- Tribe: Hexepeolini
- Genus: Hexepeolus; Linsley & Michener, 1937

= Hexepeolus =

Genus of bees

Hexepeolus is a genus of cuckoo bees in the family Apidae. It is the only genus in the tribe Hexepeolini, and contains only a single species, Hexepeolus rhodogyne.
