= Pasites =

Scientific classification
- Domain: Eukaryota
- Kingdom: Animalia
- Phylum: Arthropoda
- Class: Insecta
- Order: Hymenoptera
- Family: Apidae
- Tribe: Ammobatini
- Genus: Pasites; Jurine, 1807

Genus of bees

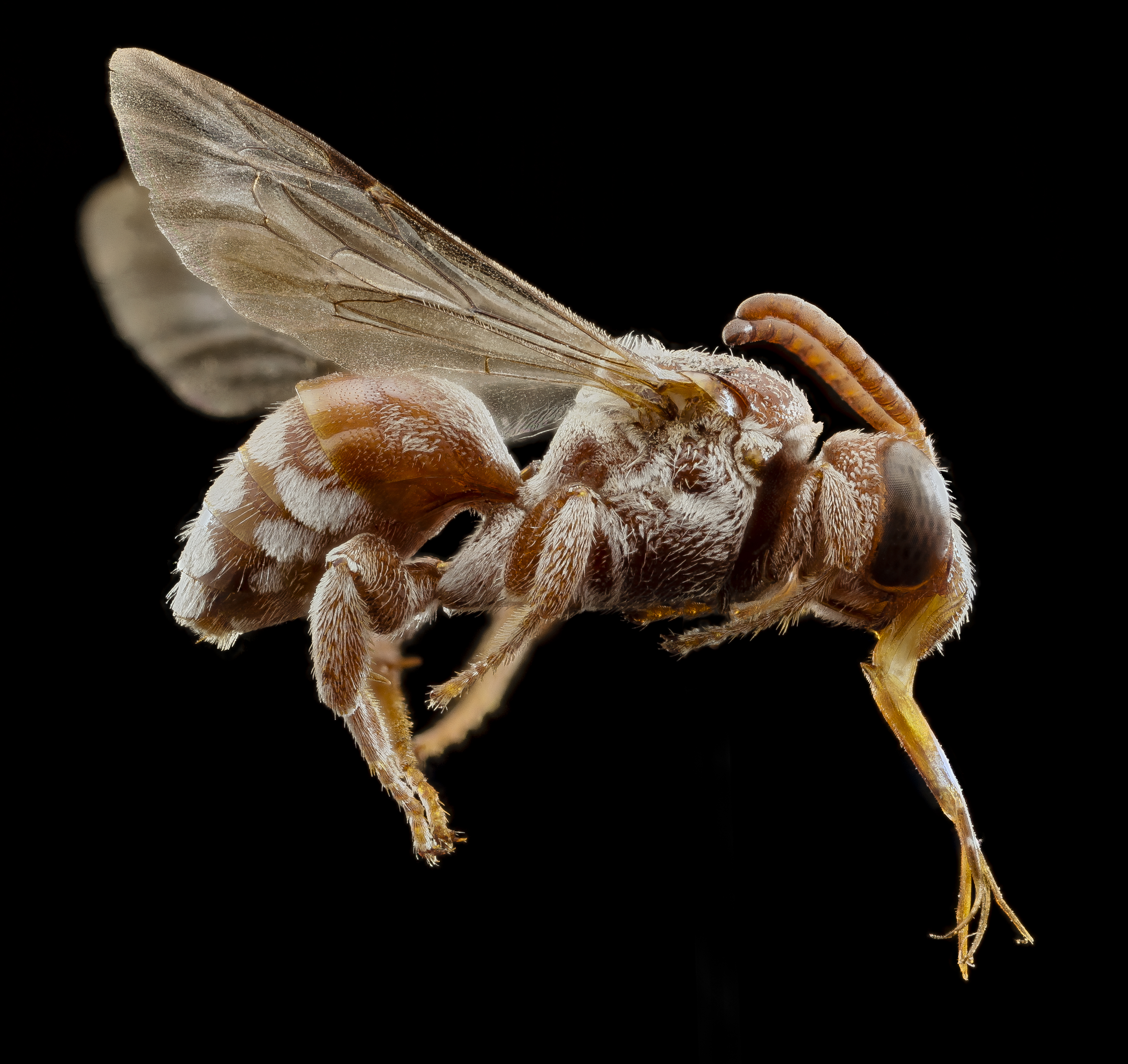
Pasites maculatus, White-spotted Red Cuckoo Bee

Pasites is a genus of cuckoo bees belonging to the family Apidae.

The species of this genus are found in Europe, Western Asia and Africa.

Species:

- Pasites appletoni (Cockerell, 1910)
- Pasites barkeri (Cockerell, 1919)
- Pasites bicolor Friese, 1900
- Pasites braunsi (Bischoff, 1923)
- Pasites carnifex (Gerstäcker, 1869)
- Pasites curiosus Warncke, 1985
- Pasites dichrous Smith, 1854
- Pasites dimidiata (Benoist, 1950)
- Pasites esakii Popov & Yasumatsu, 1935
- Pasites friesei Cockerell, 1910
- Pasites gnomus Eardley, 1997
- Pasites histrio (Gerstäcker, 1869)
- Pasites humectus Eardley, 1997
- Pasites jenseni (Friese, 1915)
- Pasites jonesi (Cockerell, 1921)
- Pasites maculates
- Pasites maculatus Jurine, 1807
- Pasites namibiensis Eardley, 1997
- Pasites nilssoni Eardley, 1997
- Pasites paulyi Eardley, 1997
- Pasites rufipes (Friese, 1915)
- Pasites somalicus Eardley, 1997
- Pasites tegularis Friese, 1922
