= Triopasites =

Scientific classification
- Domain: Eukaryota
- Kingdom: Animalia
- Phylum: Arthropoda
- Class: Insecta
- Order: Hymenoptera
- Family: Apidae
- Tribe: Brachynomadini
- Genus: Triopasites; Linsley, 1939

Genus of bees

Triopasites is a genus of cuckoo bees in the family Apidae. There are at least two described species in Triopasites.

== Species ==
These two species belong to the genus Triopasites:

- Triopasites penniger (Cockerell, 1894)
- Triopasites spinifera Rozen, 1997
