= Schmiedeknechtia =

Scientific classification
- Domain: Eukaryota
- Kingdom: Animalia
- Phylum: Arthropoda
- Class: Insecta
- Order: Hymenoptera
- Family: Apidae
- Subfamily: Nomadinae
- Genus: Schmiedeknechtia; Friese, 1896

Genus of bees

Schmiedeknechtia is a genus of cuckoo bees belonging to the family Apidae.

Species:

- Schmiedeknechtia brevicornis Schwarz, 1993
- Schmiedeknechtia gussakovskyi Popov, 1934
- Schmiedeknechtia oraniensis Friese, 1896
- Schmiedeknechtia piliventris Schwarz, 1993
- Schmiedeknechtia verhoeffi Mavromoustakis, 1959
- Schmiedeknechtia walteri Schwarz, 1993
