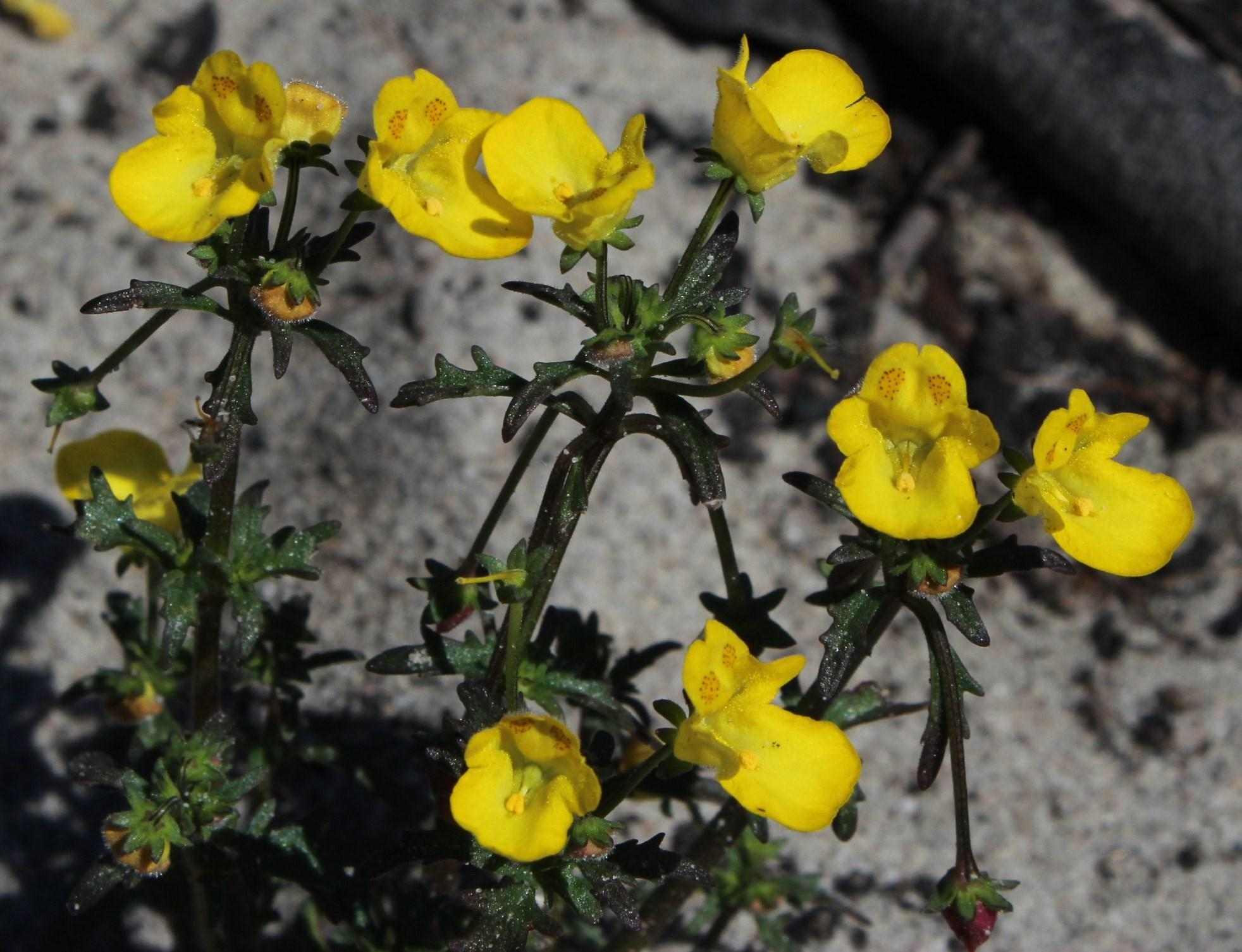

Conservation status
- Least Concern (SANBI Red List)

Scientific classification
- Kingdom: Plantae
- Clade: Tracheophytes
- Clade: Angiosperms
- Clade: Eudicots
- Clade: Asterids
- Order: Lamiales
- Family: Scrophulariaceae
- Genus: Hemimeris
- Species: H. sabulosa

Binomial name
- Hemimeris sabulosa L.f.

= Hemimeris sabulosa =

Species of flowering plant endemic to the Western Cape

Hemimeris sabulosa is a species of flowering plant in the figwort family. It is endemic to the Cape Provinces of South Africa.
