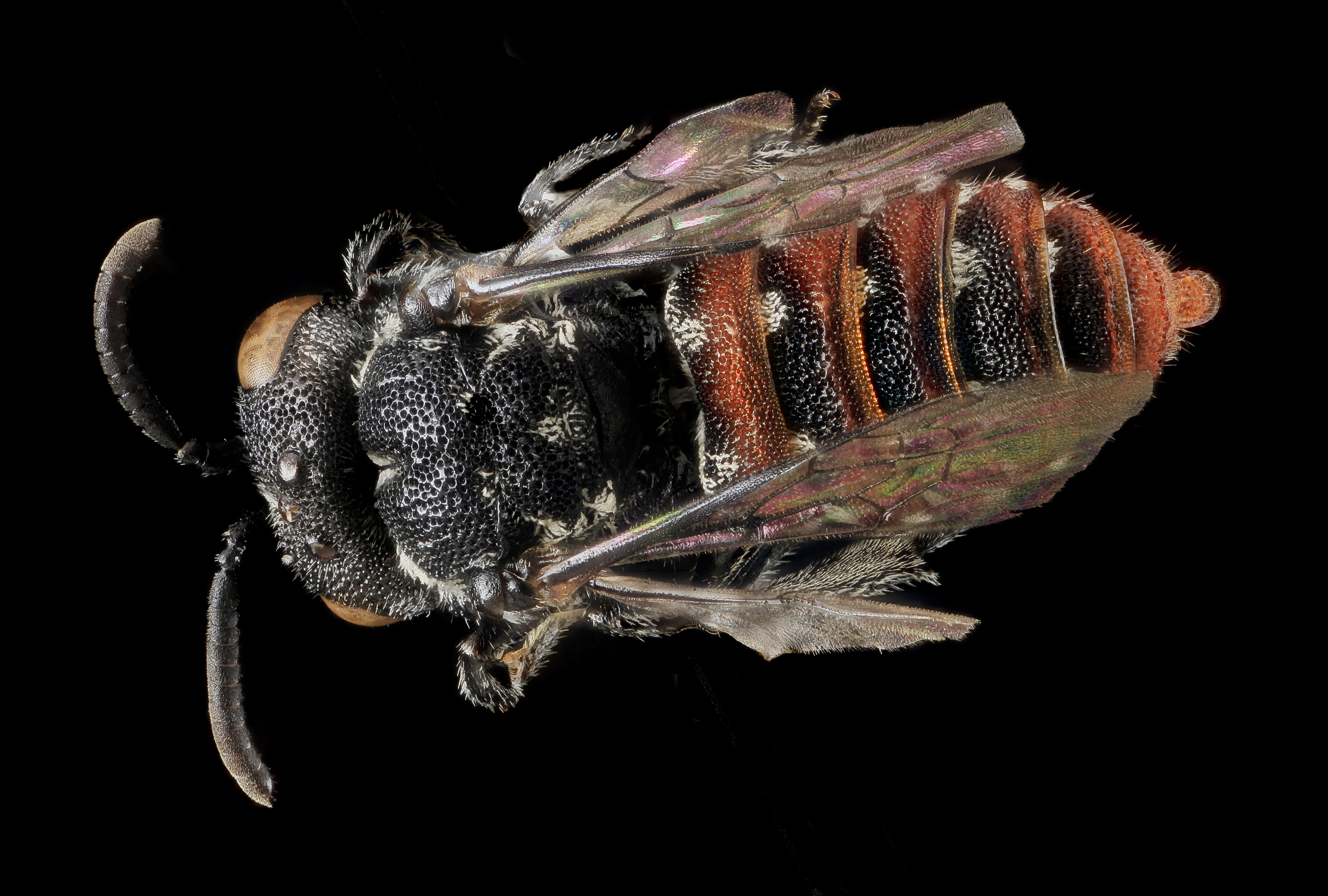
- Holcopasites calliopsidis

Scientific classification
- Kingdom: Animalia
- Phylum: Arthropoda
- Class: Insecta
- Order: Hymenoptera
- Family: Apidae
- Tribe: Ammobatoidini
- Genus: Holcopasites; Ashmead, 1899

= Holcopasites =

Genus of bees

Holcopasites is a genus of cuckoo bees in the family Apidae. There are at least 20 described species in Holcopasites. They are uncommon and very small. Unlike nearly all other genera of Apidae males of the species have 12 antennal segments instead of 13. In the most common, Eastern species, abdomens are red with bright white patches of hair.

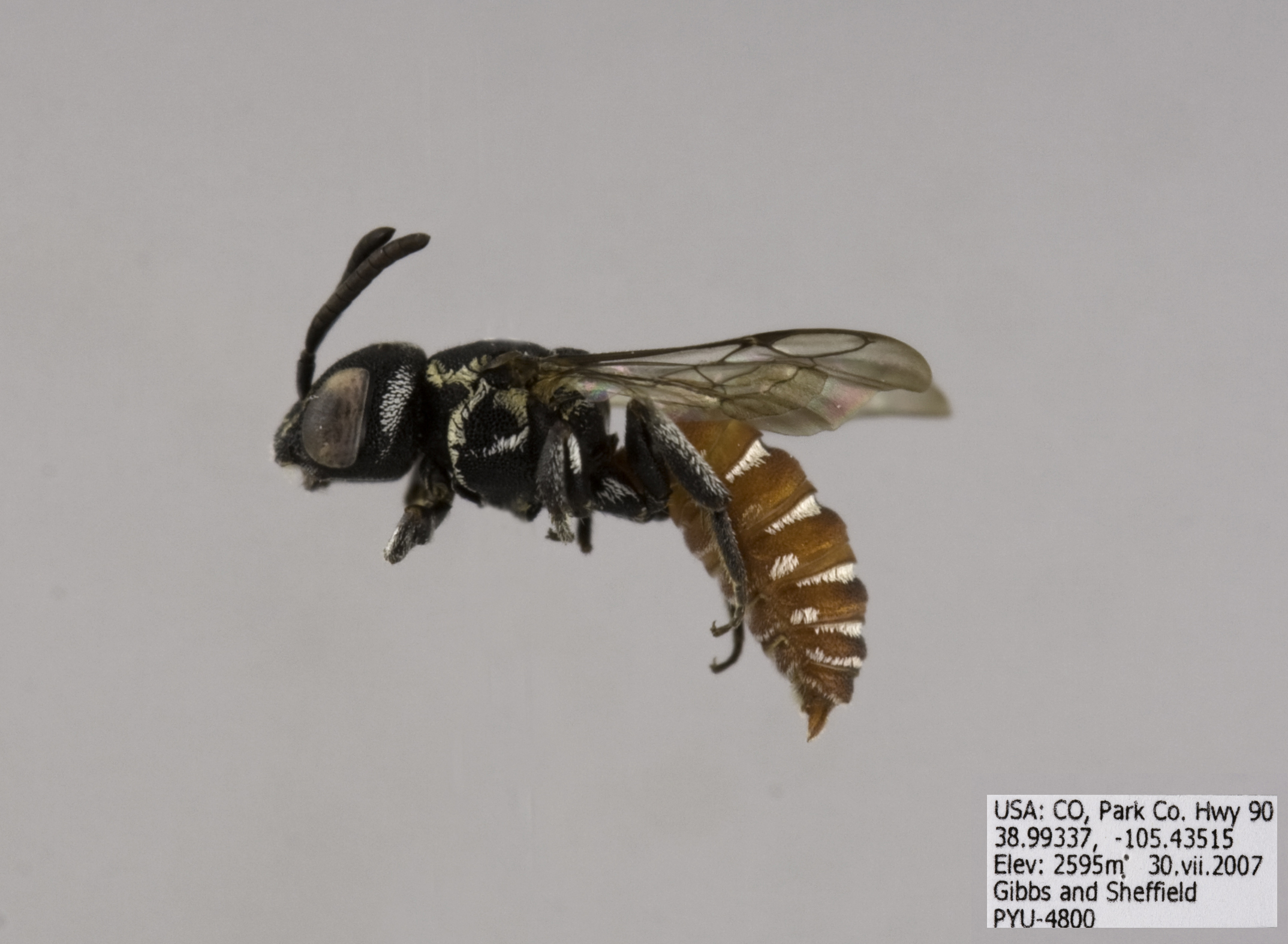
Holcopasites stevensi

== Species ==
- Holcopasites apacheorum Hurd & Linsley, 1972
- Holcopasites arizonicus (Linsley, 1942)
- Holcopasites bigibbosus Hurd & Linsley, 1972
- Holcopasites bohartorum Hurd & Linsley, 1972
- Holcopasites calliopsidis (Linsley, 1943)
- Holcopasites cazieri Hurd & Linsley, 1972
- Holcopasites eamia (Cockerell, 1909)
- Holcopasites haematurus Cockerell & Hicks, 1926
- Holcopasites heliopsis (Robertson, 1897)
- Holcopasites illinoiensis (Robertson, 1891)
- Holcopasites insoletus (Linsley, 1942)
- Holcopasites jerryrozeni Neff, 2004
- Holcopasites linsleyi Cooper, 1993
- Holcopasites minimus (Linsley, 1943)
- Holcopasites pulchellus (Cresson, 1878)
- Holcopasites rozeni Hurd & Linsley, 1972
- Holcopasites ruthae Cooper, 1993
- Holcopasites stevensi Crawford, 1915
- Holcopasites tegularis Hurd & Linsley, 1972
