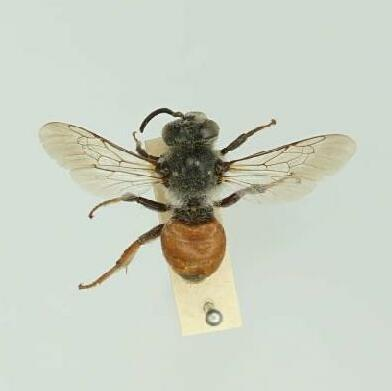
- Ammobatoides abdominalis

Scientific classification
- Kingdom: Animalia
- Phylum: Arthropoda
- Clade: Pancrustacea
- Class: Insecta
- Order: Hymenoptera
- Family: Apidae
- Subfamily: Nomadinae
- Genus: Ammobatoides; Radoszkowski, 1867

= Ammobatoides =

Genus of bees

Ammobatoides is a genus of Old World cuckoo bees belonging to the family Apidae. They lay their eggs in the nests of Melitturga and Meliturgula species.

The species of this genus are found in Europe, Russia, northern China, the Middle East, and parts of Africa.

Species:

- Ammobatoides abdominalis (Eversmann, 1852)
- Ammobatoides braunsi (Bischoff, 1923)
- Ammobatoides luctuosus (Friese, 1911)
- Ammobatoides okalii (Kocourek, 1990)
- Ammobatoides radoszkowskii (Proshchalykin & Lelej, 2014)
- Ammobatoides rubescens (Bischoff, 1923)
- Ammobatoides schachti (Schwarz, 1988)
- Ammobatoides schwarzi (Wood, 2023)
- Ammobatoides scriptus (Gerstäcker, 1869)
