= Chiasmognathus =

Scientific classification
- Kingdom: Animalia
- Phylum: Arthropoda
- Clade: Pancrustacea
- Class: Insecta
- Order: Hymenoptera
- Family: Apidae
- Tribe: Ammobatini
- Genus: Chiasmognathus; Engel, 2006

Genus of insects

Chiasmognathus is a genus of cuckoo bees belonging to the family Apidae.

The species of this genus are found in Africa, Middle East, South Asia, and small range of Europe.

Species:

- Chiasmognathus aegyptiacus (Warncke, 1983)
- Chiasmognathus aturksvenicus (Engel, Packer & Martins, 2019)
- Chiasmognathus batelkai Straka & Engel, 2012
- Chiasmognathus gussakovskii (Popov, 1937)
- Chiasmognathus nearchus (Engel, 2009)
- Chiasmognathus orientanus Warncke, 1983
- Chiasmognathus pashupati Engel, 2007
- Chiasmognathus riftensis (Engel, Packer & Martins, 2019)
- Chiasmognathus sabaicus Engel & Straka, 2016
- Chiasmognathus saheliensis Engel, 2010
- Chiasmognathus scythicus Engel & Packer, 2013
- Chiasmognathus taprobanicola (Engel, 2008)
