= Hans Bischoff =

German entomologist

Hans Bischoff (30 November 1889 – 18 March 1960) was a German entomologist from Berlin.

He was Kustos or curator of Hymenoptera (and Neuropterida) at Museum für Naturkunde (Berlin) from 1921 until 1955.

He went to the Netherlands to take the Wasmann Collection of ants during World War II in order to take them to the Berlin museum. 1234446

== Selected works ==
- Biologie der Hymenopteren. Eine Naturgeschichte der Hautflügler. Biologische Studienbücher 5. VII + 598 pp., Verlag von Julius Springer, Berlin(1927).
- Inventa entomologica itineris Hispanici et Maroccani, quod a. 1926 fecerunt Harald et Håkan Lindberg. XV. Chrysididae, Cleptidae, Scoliidae, Tiphiidae, Methocidae, Sapygidae, Sphecidae, Masaridae, Vespidae. Commentationes Biologicae, Helsingfors, 4 (3): 1-7 (1933).

with Stadler H., Die Hautflügler des Rombergs. Nachrichtenblatt der Bayerischen Entomologen (München) 3(12): 125-128 (1954).

== Collections ==
- Personal collection of Europe Coleoptera in Museum für Naturkunde (Berlin)
