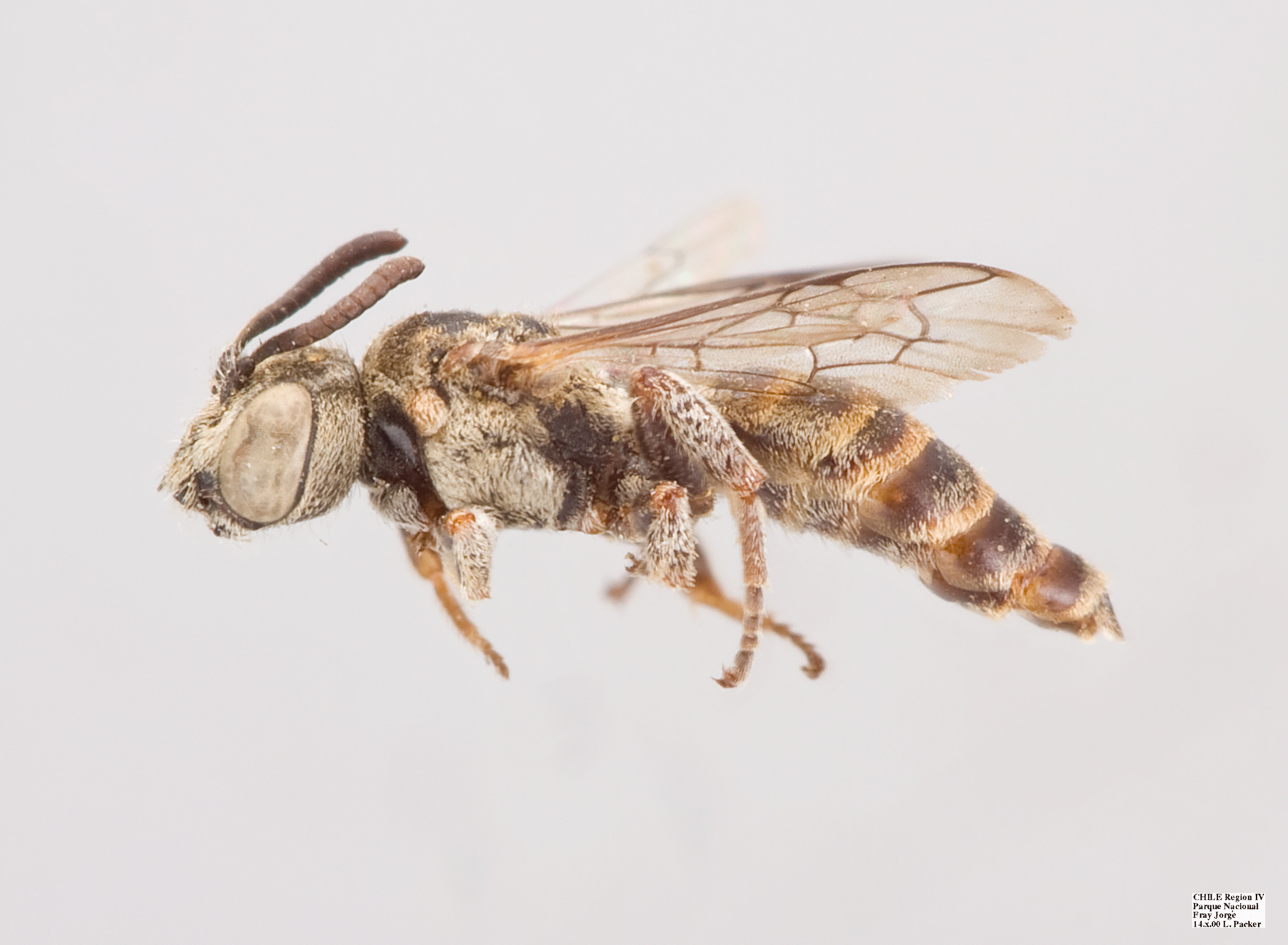
- Kelita toroi

Scientific classification
- Domain: Eukaryota
- Kingdom: Animalia
- Phylum: Arthropoda
- Class: Insecta
- Order: Hymenoptera
- Family: Apidae
- Tribe: Brachynomadini
- Genus: Kelita; Sandhouse, 1943

= Kelita (bee) =

Genus of bees

Kelita is a genus of cuckoo bees belonging to the family Apidae.

The species of this genus are found in South America.

Selected species:

- Kelita argentina Rozen, 1997
- Kelita chilensis (Friese, 1916)
