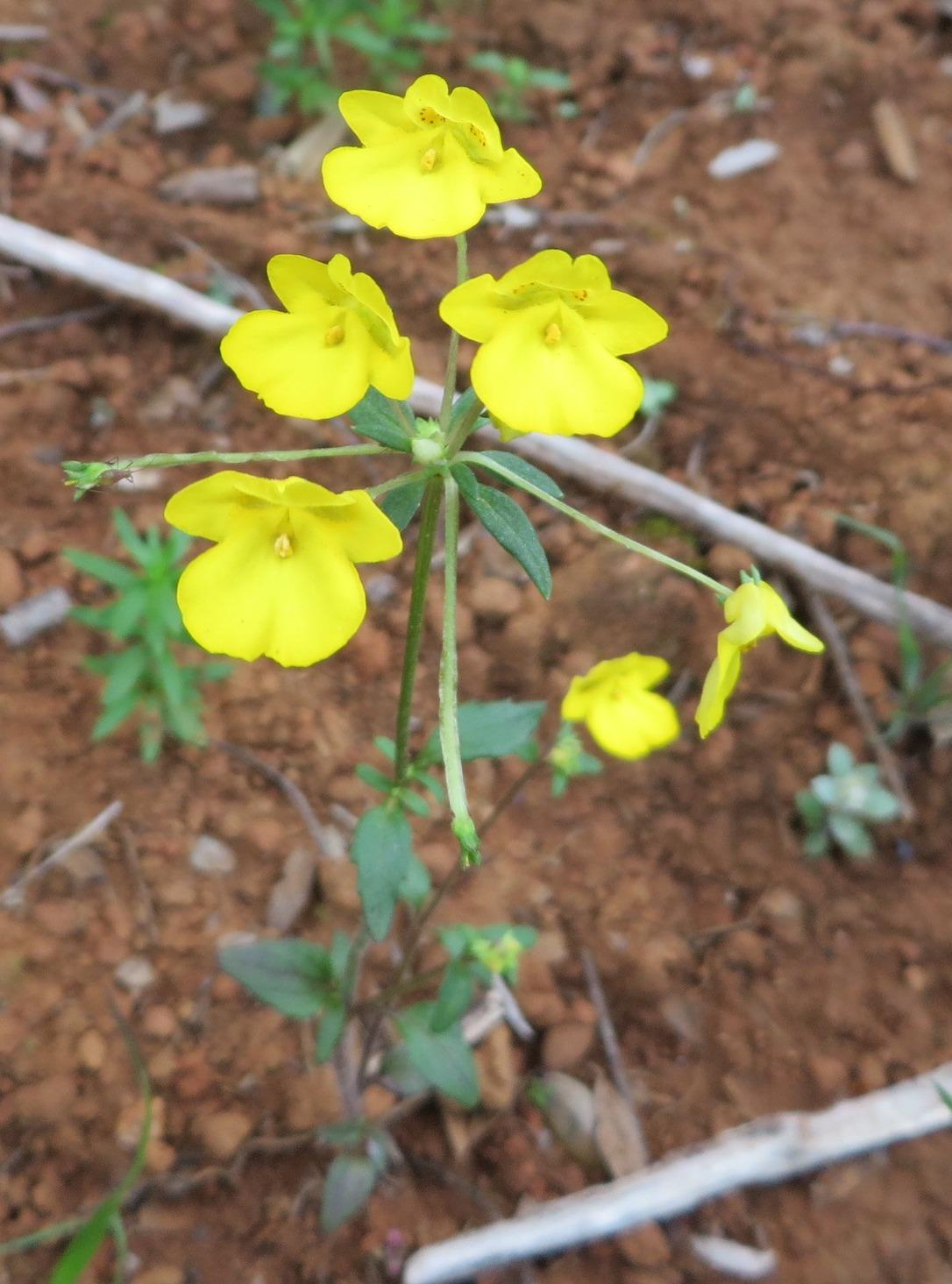
- Hemimeris warszewiczii

Scientific classification
- Kingdom: Plantae
- Clade: Embryophytes
- Clade: Tracheophytes
- Clade: Angiosperms
- Clade: Eudicots
- Clade: Asterids
- Order: Lamiales
- Family: Scrophulariaceae
- Tribe: Hemimerideae
- Genus: Hemimeris; L.f.

Species
- See text.

= Hemimeris =

Genus of flowering plants

Hemimeris is a genus of flowering plants in the family Scrophulariaceae, native to the Cape Provinces of South Africa. They secrete oils to attract specialized oil-collecting bees from the genus Rediviva.

== Species ==
As of September 2020, the following species were accepted:

- Hemimeris centrodes Hiern
- Hemimeris gracilis Schltr.
- Hemimeris montana L.f.
- Hemimeris racemosa (Houtt.) Merr.
- Hemimeris sabulosa L.f.
