= Aethammobates =

Scientific classification
- Domain: Eukaryota
- Kingdom: Animalia
- Phylum: Arthropoda
- Class: Insecta
- Order: Hymenoptera
- Family: Apidae
- Genus: Aethammobates; Baker, 1994
- Species: A. prionogaster

Binomial name
- Aethammobates prionogaster Baker, 1994

Genus of bees

Aethammobates is a monotypic genus of cuckoo bees belonging to the family Apidae. The only species is Aethammobates prionogaster.

The species is found in Egypt.
