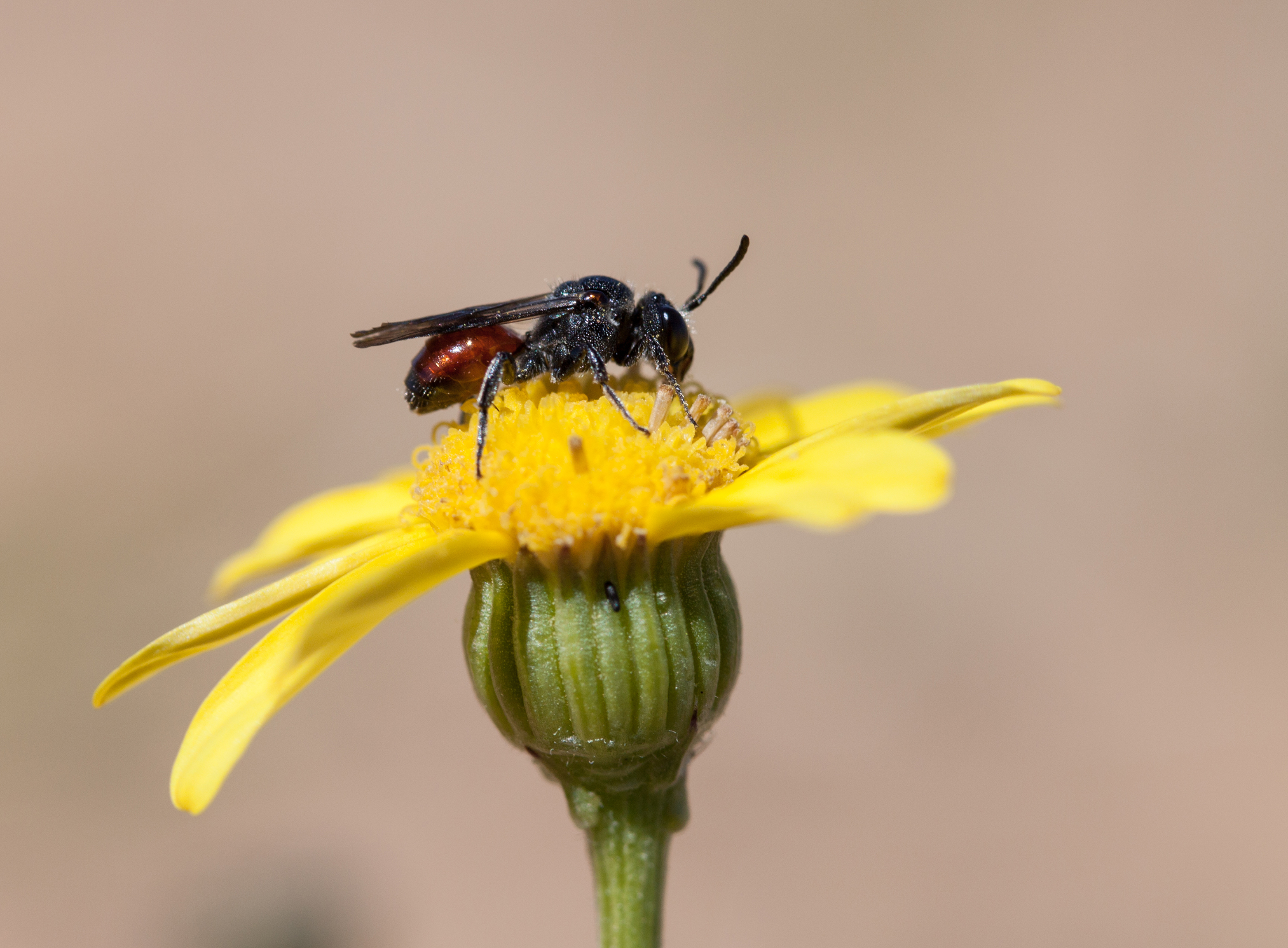
- Sphecodopsis

Scientific classification
- Domain: Eukaryota
- Kingdom: Animalia
- Phylum: Arthropoda
- Class: Insecta
- Order: Hymenoptera
- Family: Apidae
- Subfamily: Nomadinae
- Tribe: Ammobatini

= Ammobatini =

Species of insect

Ammobatini is a tribe of cuckoo bees in the family Apidae. There are about 8 genera and more than 130 described species in Ammobatini.

== Genera ==
These eight genera belong to the tribe Ammobatini:

- Ammobates Latreille, 1809
- Chiasmognathus Engel, 2006
- Melanempis Saussure, 1890
- Oreopasites Cockerell, 1906
- Parammobatodes Popov, 1931
- Pasites Jurine, 1807
- Sphecodopsis Bischoff, 1923
- Spinopasites Warncke, 1983
