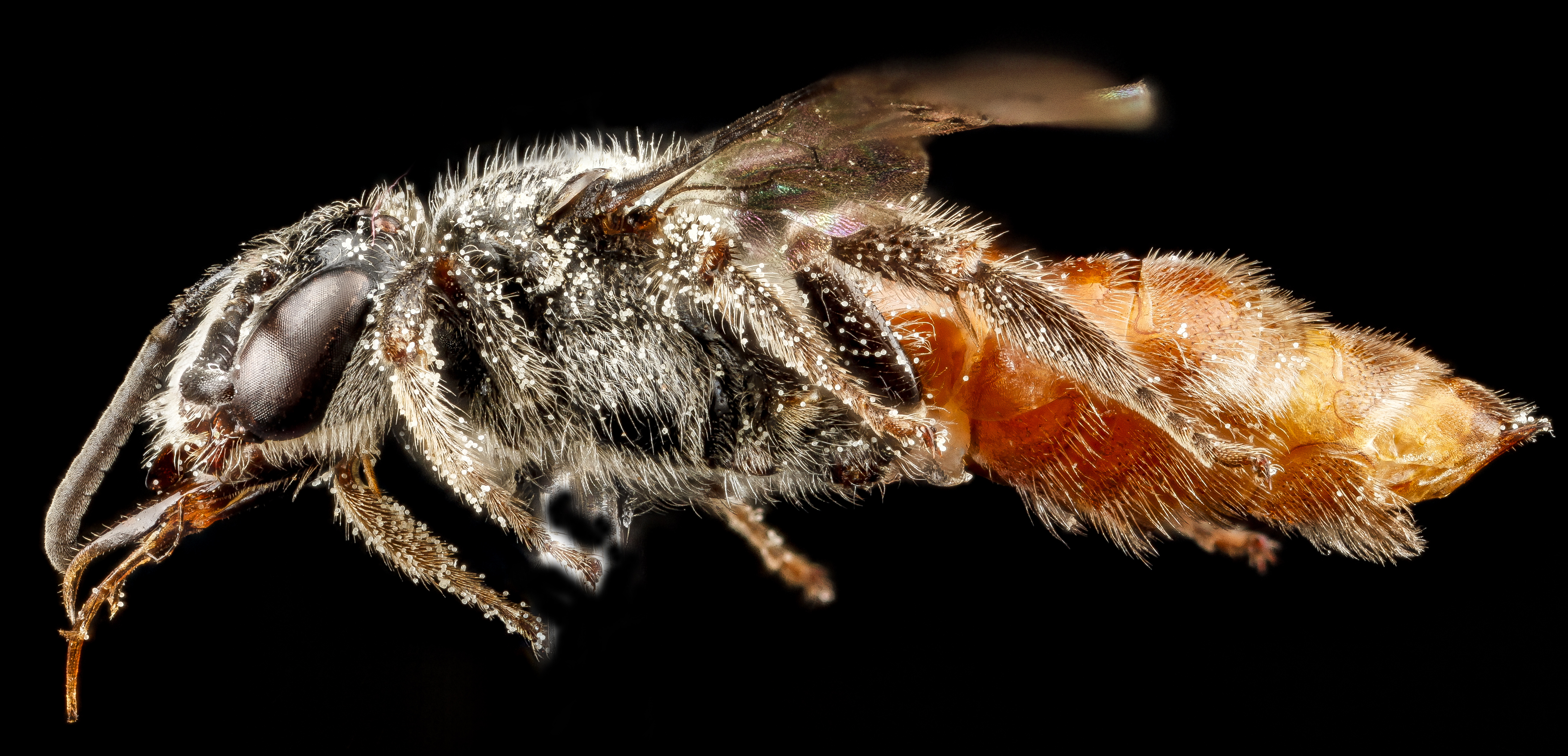
- Brachynomada grindeliae

Scientific classification
- Domain: Eukaryota
- Kingdom: Animalia
- Phylum: Arthropoda
- Class: Insecta
- Order: Hymenoptera
- Family: Apidae
- Subfamily: Nomadinae
- Tribe: Brachynomadini

= Brachynomadini =

Tribe of bees

Brachynomadini is a tribe of cuckoo bees in the family Apidae. There are at least 5 genera and 20 described species in Brachynomadini.

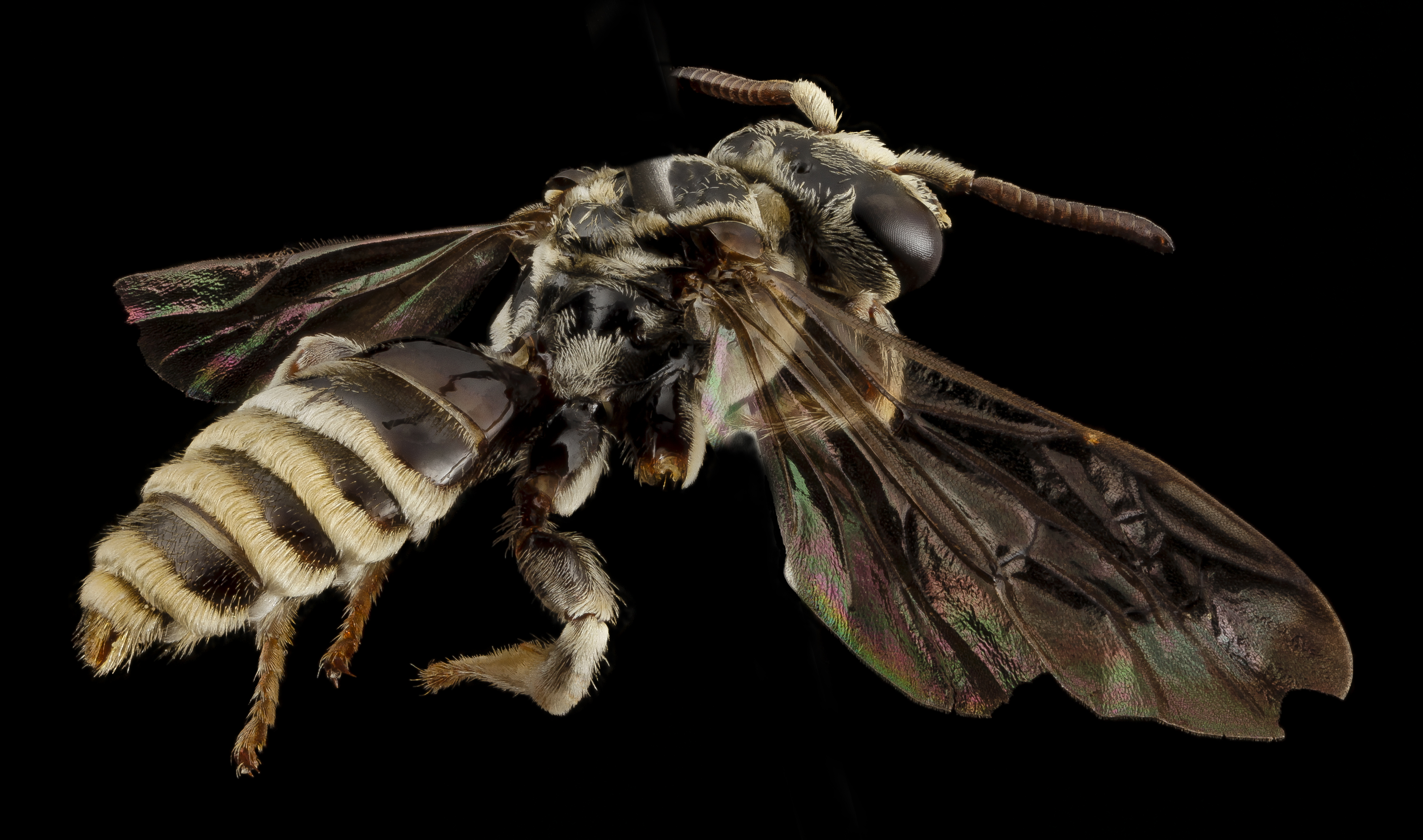
Paranomada velutina

== Genera ==
These five genera belong to the tribe Brachynomadini:

- Brachynomada Holmberg, 1886^{i c g b}
- Kelita Sandhouse, 1943^{i c g}
- Paranomada Linsley & Michener, 1937^{i c g b}
- Triopasites Linsley, 1939^{i c g b}

Data sources: i = ITIS, c = Catalogue of Life, g = GBIF, b = Bugguide.net
