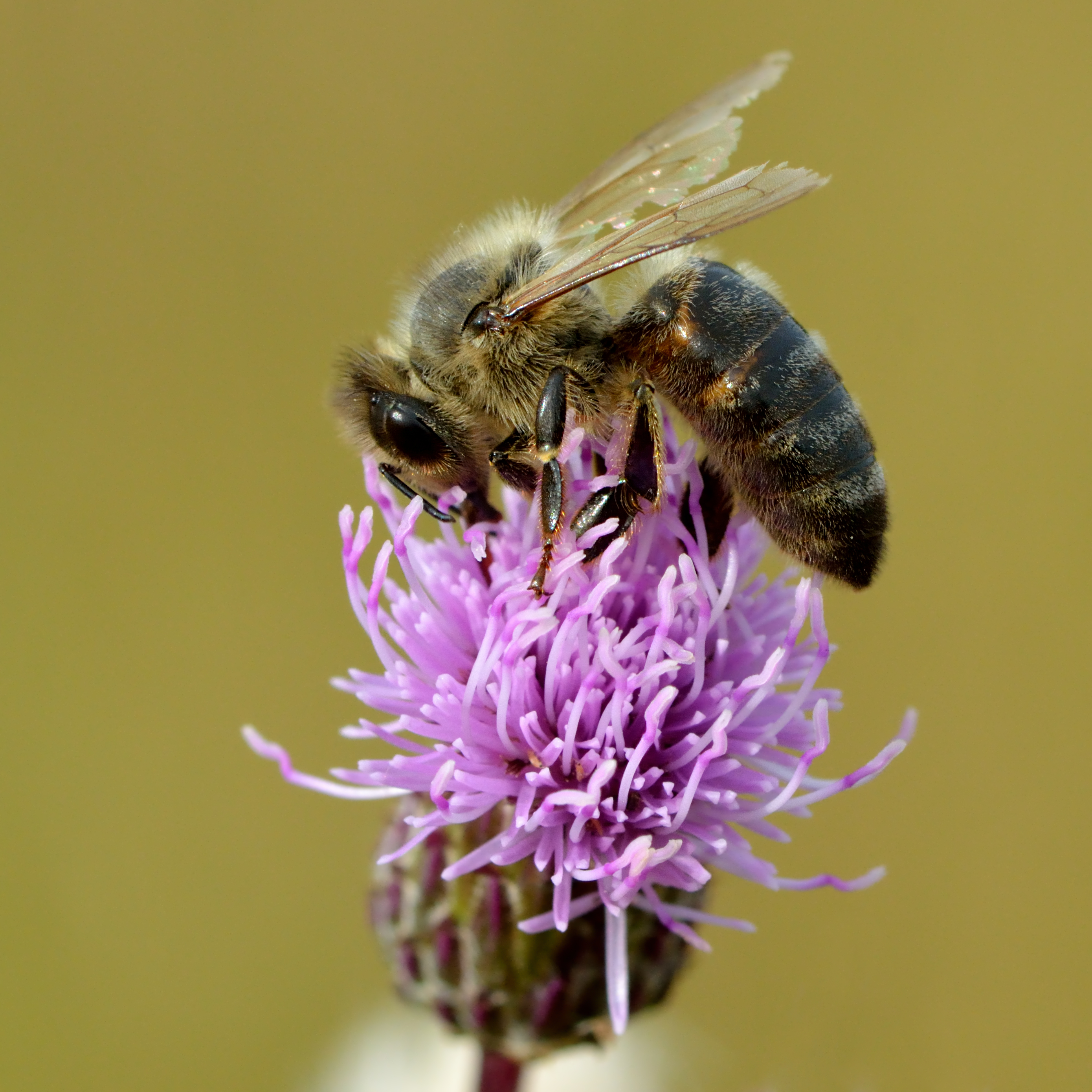
- Apis mellifera (a Western honey bee), on a Canada thistle

Scientific classification
- Kingdom: Animalia
- Phylum: Arthropoda
- Clade: Pancrustacea
- Class: Insecta
- Order: Hymenoptera
- Superfamily: Apoidea
- Clade: Anthophila
- Family: Apidae; Latreille, 1802

Type genus
- Apis Linnaeus, 1758

Subfamilies
- Apinae; Nomadinae; Xylocopinae

= Apidae =

Apidae Temporal range: Maastrichtian–present

Family of bees

Apidae is the largest family within the superfamily Apoidea, containing at least 5700 species of bees. The family includes some of the most commonly seen bees, including bumblebees and honey bees, but also includes stingless bees (also used for honey production), carpenter bees, orchid bees, cuckoo bees, and a number of other less widely known groups. Many are valuable pollinators in natural habitats and for agricultural crops.

== Taxonomy ==
In addition to its historical classification (honey bees, bumble bees, stingless bees and orchid bees), the family Apidae presently includes all the genera formerly placed in the families Anthophoridae and Ctenoplectridae. Although the most visible members of Apidae are social, the vast majority of apid bees are solitary, including a number of kleptoparasitic species.

The old family Apidae contained four tribes (Apinae: Apini, Euglossini and Bombinae: Bombini, Meliponini) which have been reclassified as tribes of the subfamily Apinae, along with all of the former tribes and subfamilies of Anthophoridae and the former family Ctenoplectridae, which was demoted to tribe status. The trend to move groups down in taxonomic rank has been taken further by a 2005 Brazilian classification that places all existing bee families together under the name "Apidae", but it has not been widely accepted in the literature since that time.

The earliest known fossil apid is the Late Cretaceous-aged stingless bee Cretotrigona, suggesting that a significant evolutionary radiation into their extant clades must have already occurred among bees prior to the Cretaceous-Paleogene extinction event. The single known specimen is of a worker, suggesting that eusociality must have already evolved by this point as well.

=== Subfamilies ===
==== Apinae ====
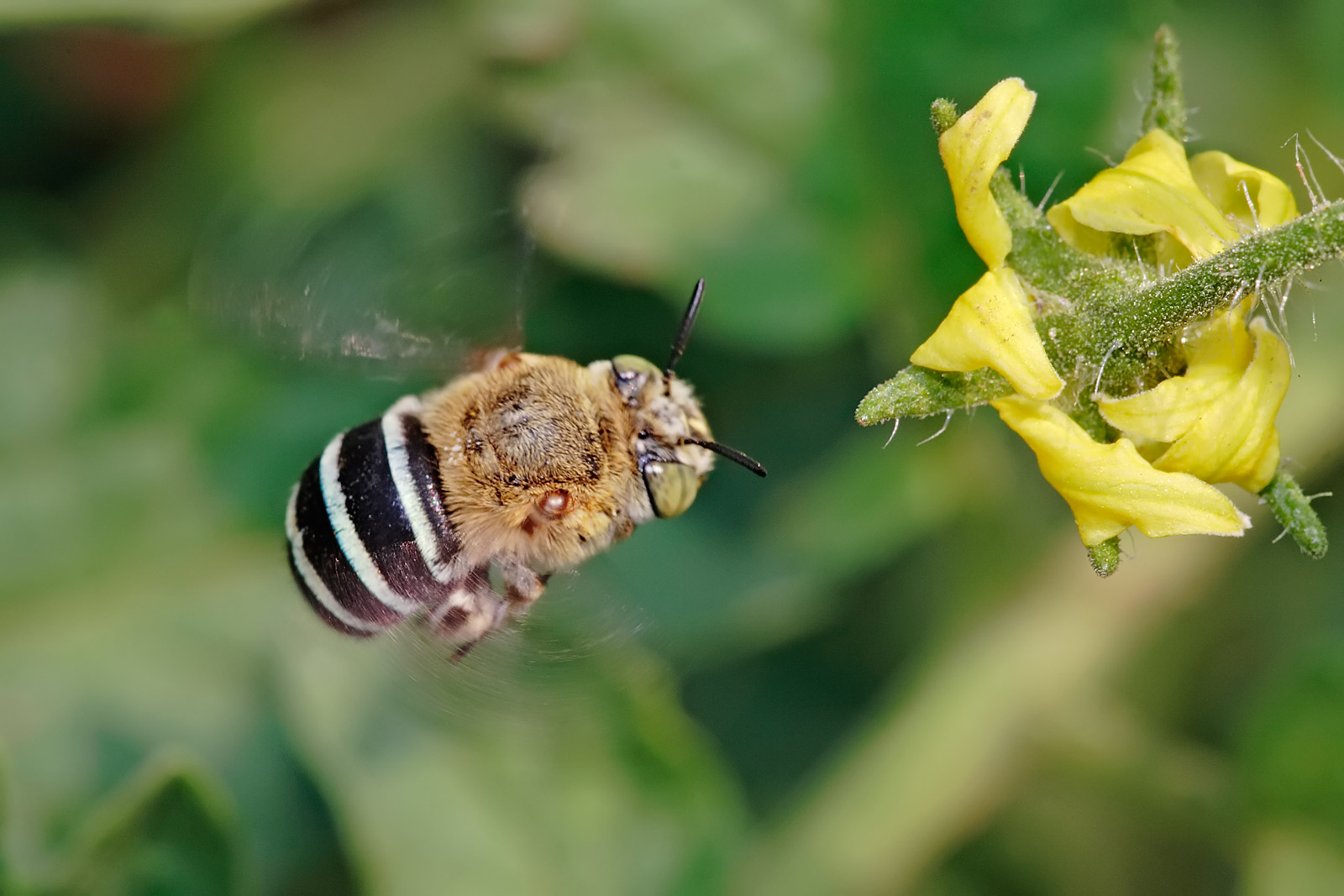
Amegilla cingulata—a subfamily Apinae digger bee species, of Australian blue banded bees, approaching tomato flower

The subfamily Apinae contains honey bees, bumblebees, stingless bees, orchid bees, and digger bees, among others. The bees of most tribes placed in Apinae are solitary with nests that are simple burrows in the soil. However, honey bees, stingless bees, and bumblebees are eusocial or colonial. These are sometimes believed to have each developed this trait independently, and show notable differences in such characteristics as communication between workers and methods of nest construction.

Tribes include:

- Ancylaini
- Anthophorini
- Apini
- Bombini
- Centridini
- Ctenoplectrini
- Emphorini
- Ericrocidini
- Eucerini
- Euglossini
- Exomalopsini
- Isepeolini
- Melectini
- Meliponini
- Osirini
- Protepeolini
- Rhathymini
- Tapinotaspidini
- Tarsaliini
- Tetrapediini
- Teratognathini

==== Nomadinae ====
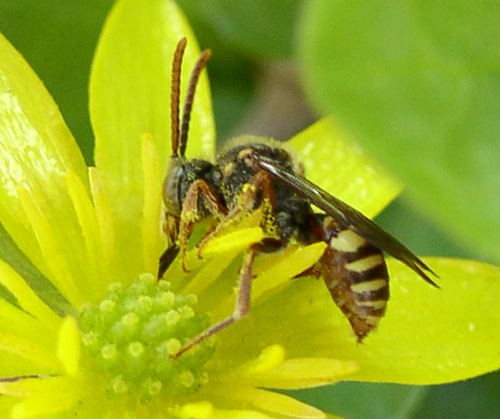
Subfamily Nomadinae cuckoo bee species, on flower.

The subfamily Nomadinae, or cuckoo bees, has 31 genera in 10 tribes which are all kleptoparasites in the nests of other bees.

Tribes include:

- Ammobatini
- Ammobatoidini
- Biastini
- Brachynomadini
- Caenoprosopidini
- Epeolini
- Hexepeolini
- Neolarrini
- Nomadini
- Townsendiellini

==== Xylocopinae ====
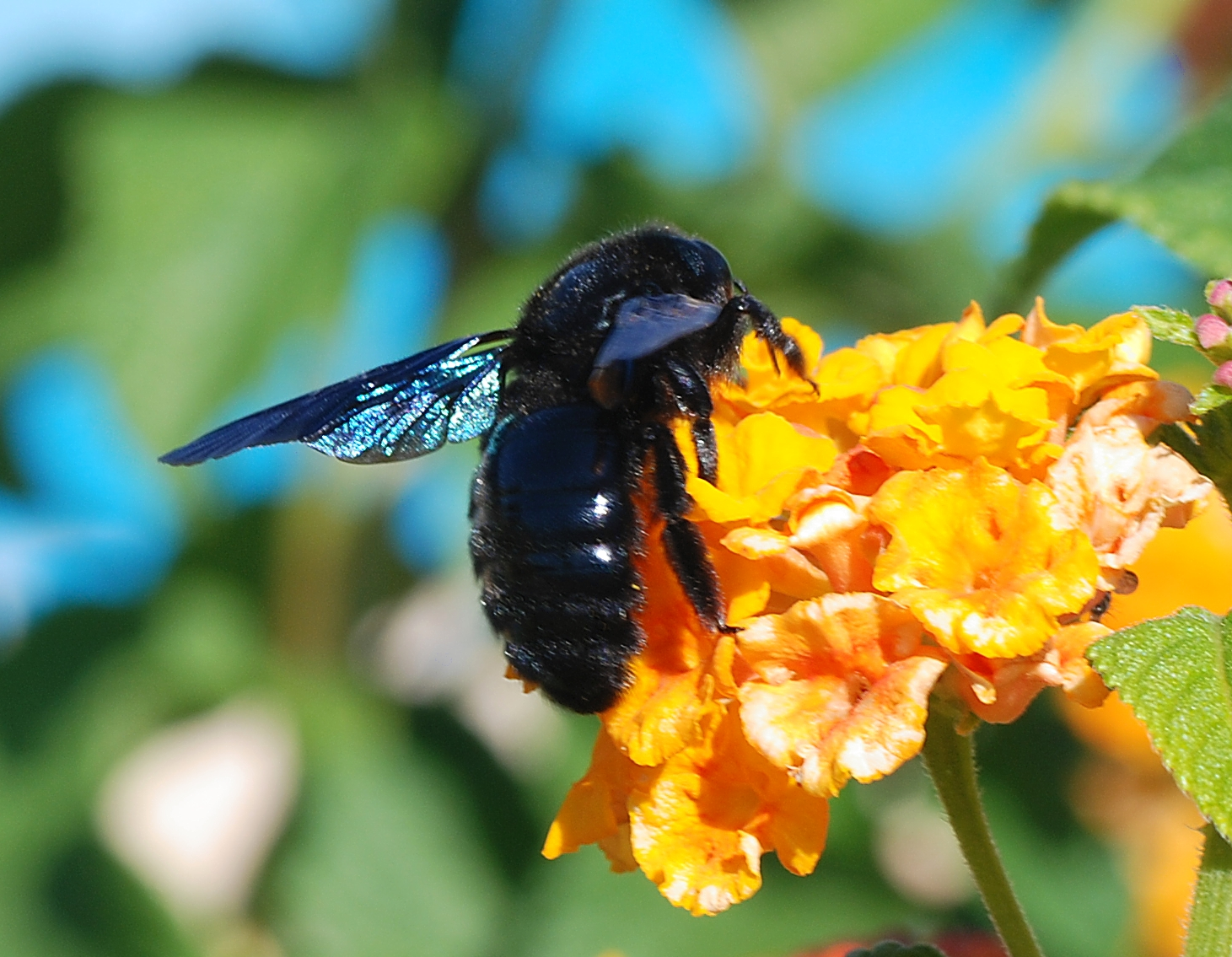
Xylocopa violacea—a subfamily Xylocopinae carpenter bee, on flower.

The subfamily Xylocopinae, which includes carpenter bees, is considered ancestrally eusocial and many species are facultatively eusocial. However, colonies are small, usually comprising only a few females. The most advanced eusociality documented is in the tribe Allodapini.

Most members of this subfamily make nests in plant stems or wood.

Tribes include:

- Allodapini
- Ceratinini
- Manueliini
- Xylocopini

== See also ==
- Bee (mythology)
- List of crop plants pollinated by bees
