= Anthophorula albicans =

Scientific classification
- Domain: Eukaryota
- Kingdom: Animalia
- Phylum: Arthropoda
- Class: Insecta
- Order: Hymenoptera
- Family: Apidae
- Tribe: Exomalopsini
- Genus: Anthophorula
- Species: A. albicans

Binomial name
- Anthophorula albicans (Provancher, 1896)

Synonyms
- Diadasiella coquilletti Ashmead, 1899; Synhalonia albicans Provancher, 1896

Species of bee

Anthophorula albicans is a species of bee in the family Apidae. It is found in Central America and North America.
