= Anthophorula palmarum =

Scientific classification
- Domain: Eukaryota
- Kingdom: Animalia
- Phylum: Arthropoda
- Class: Insecta
- Order: Hymenoptera
- Family: Apidae
- Tribe: Exomalopsini
- Genus: Anthophorula
- Species: A. palmarum

Binomial name
- Anthophorula palmarum (Timberlake, 1947)

Synonyms
- Exomalopsis palmarum Timberlake, 1947

Species of bee

Anthophorula palmarum is a species of bee in the family Apidae. It is found in Central America and North America.
