= Anthophorula completa =

Scientific classification
- Kingdom: Animalia
- Phylum: Arthropoda
- Class: Insecta
- Order: Hymenoptera
- Family: Apidae
- Tribe: Exomalopsini
- Genus: Anthophorula
- Species: A. completa

Binomial name
- Anthophorula completa (Cockerell, 1935)

Synonyms
- Exomalopsis compactula completa Cockerell, 1935

Species of bee

Anthophorula completa is a species of bee in the family Apidae. It is found in Central America and North America.
