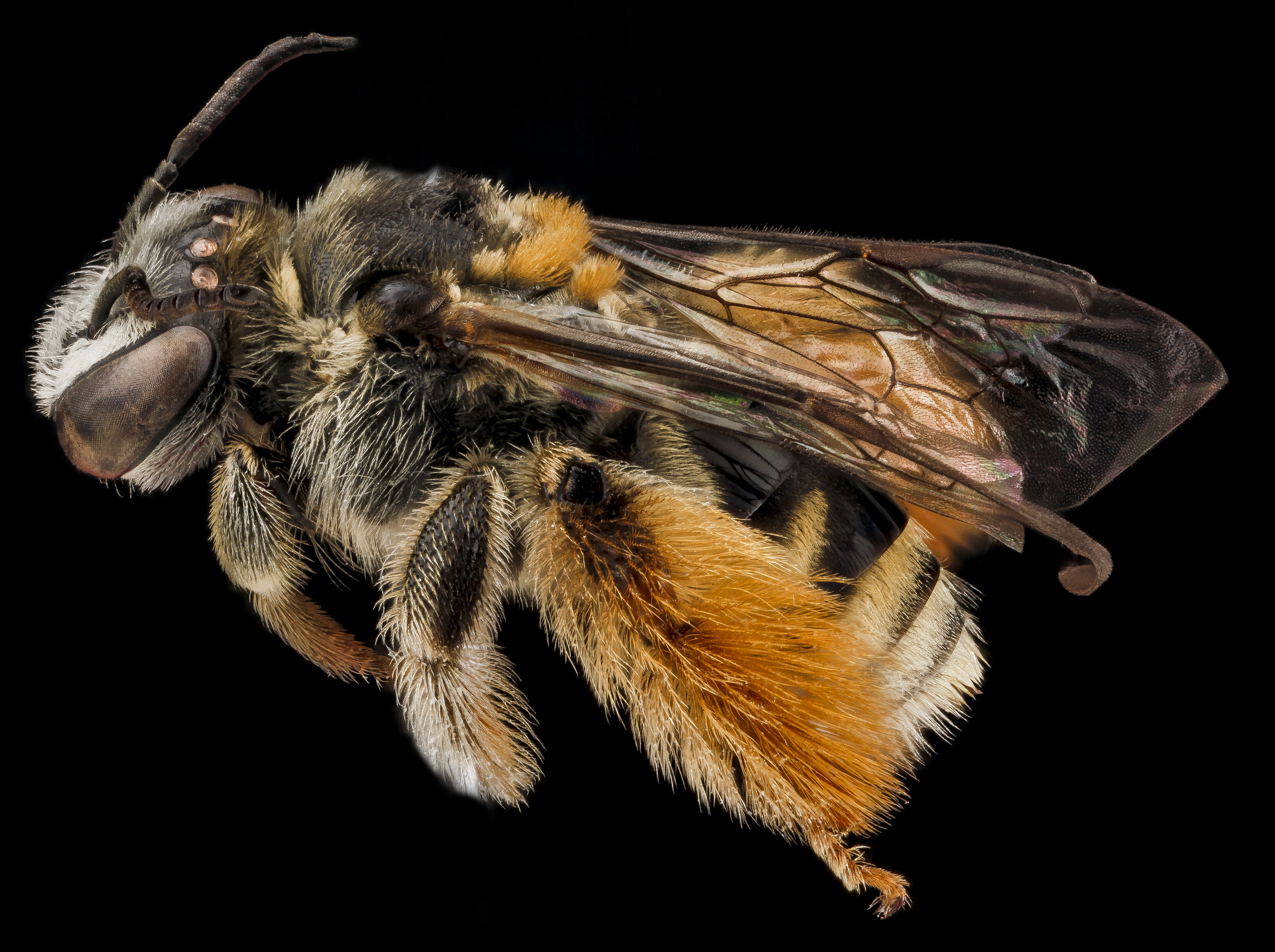
- Exomalopsis similis

Scientific classification
- Domain: Eukaryota
- Kingdom: Animalia
- Phylum: Arthropoda
- Class: Insecta
- Order: Hymenoptera
- Family: Apidae
- Tribe: Exomalopsini
- Genus: Exomalopsis; Spinola, 1853

Species
- ~90

= Exomalopsis =

Genus of bees

Exomalopsis is a genus of bees in the family Apidae. They occur in the Western Hemisphere (Neotropical and Nearctic realms).

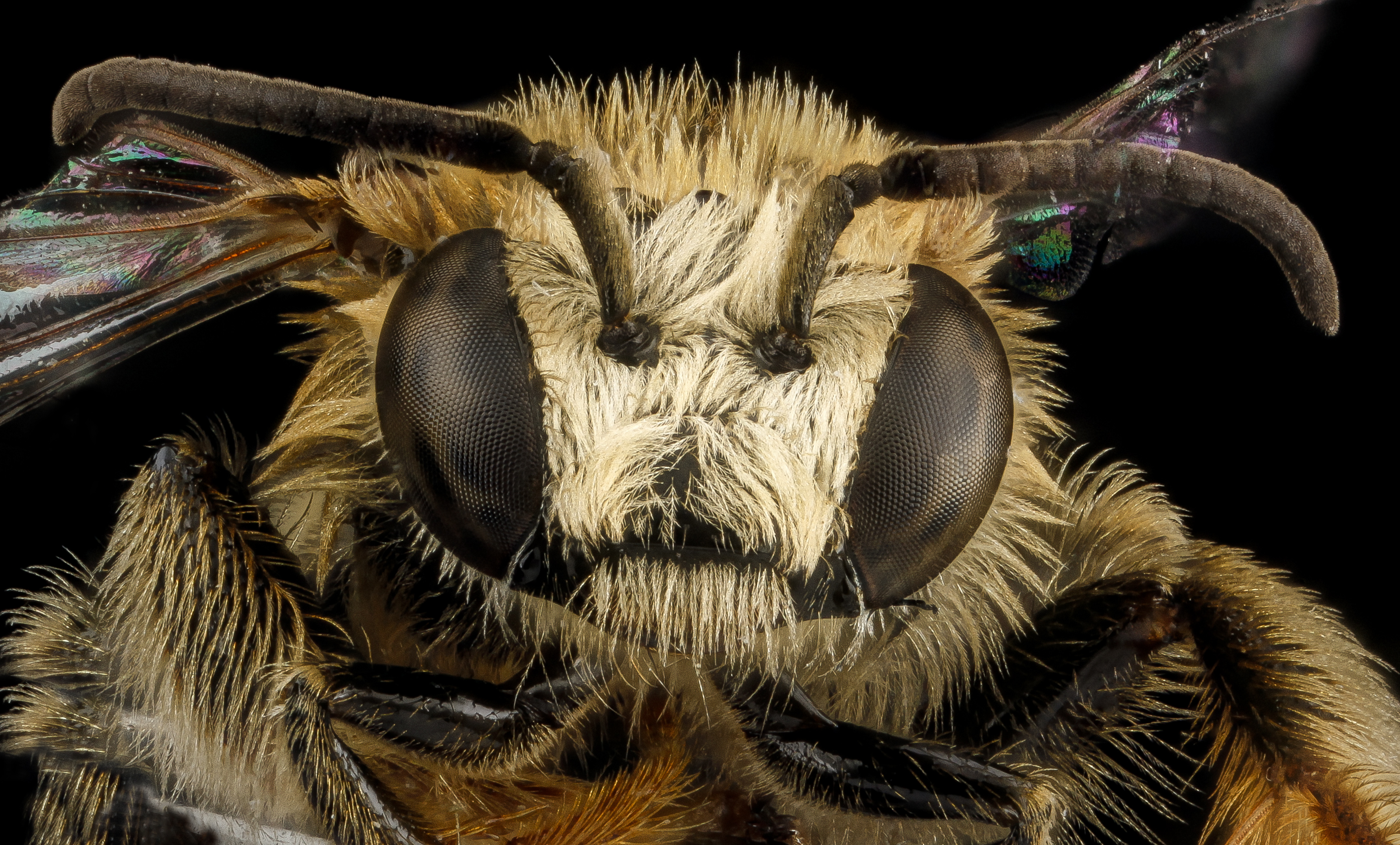
Exomalopsis analis

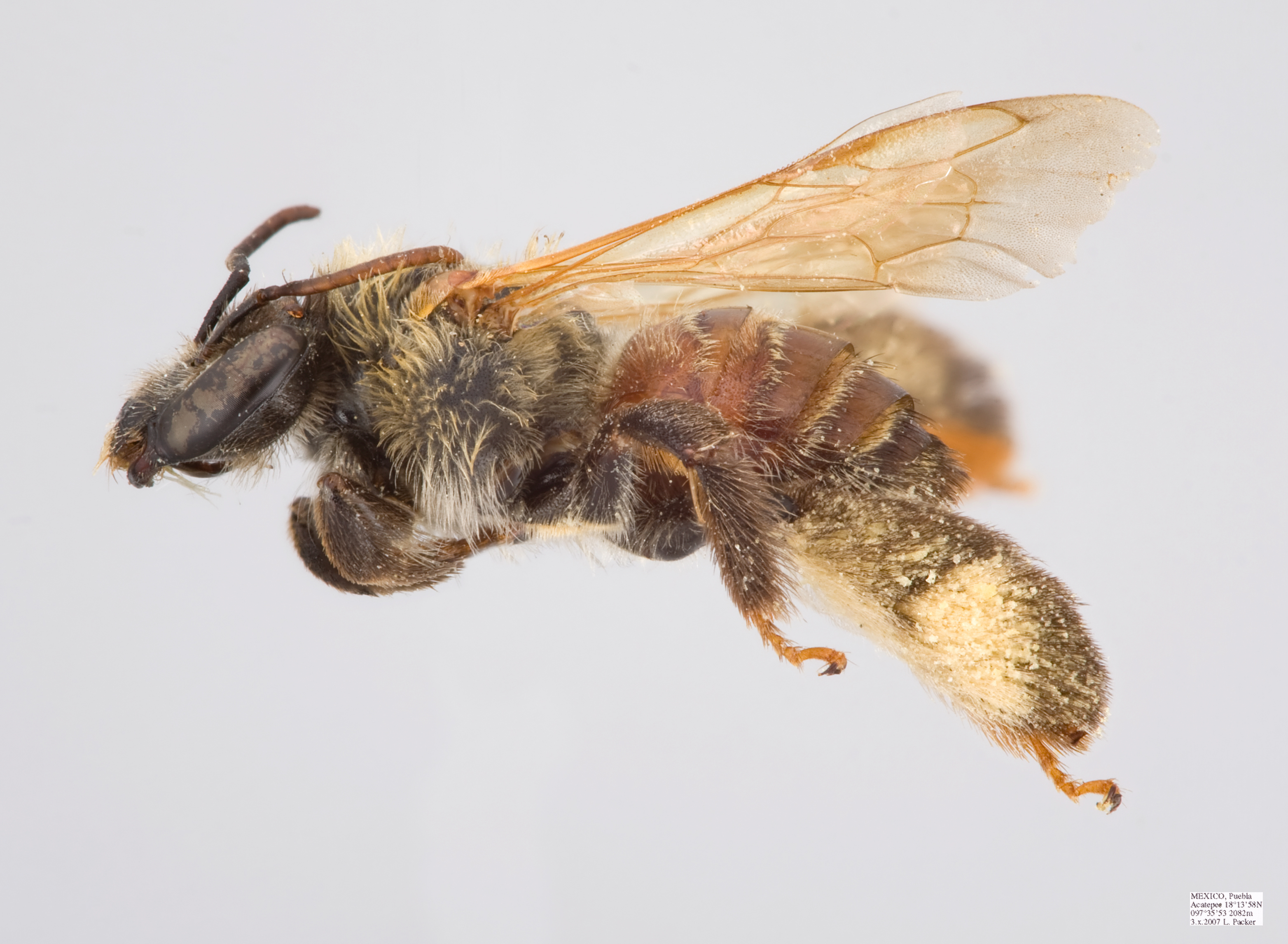
Exomalopsis mellipes

== Biology ==
Bees of this genus build communal nests. Several examples have been documented in the literature. E. aburraensis, for example, has been known to build its nest alongside the beekeepers' honeybee hives. It excavates a tunnel over a meter deep which then branches into many underground pathways that lead to cells where larvae hatch and develop. The California species E. nitens enters cracks in dry soil and digs chambers underground. There it creates a pile of food provisions and lays eggs on top. The larvae eat the food pile and then pupate. Both E. globosa and E. similis have been noted nesting in dirt roads made of gritty red clay. The gravid female piles food in a terminal cell and then molds it into a neat loaf. She lays an egg on it and then seals the cell to allow the larva to develop within.

Several Exomalopsis are associated with kleptoparasites, especially cuckoo bees. Kleptoparasitic cuckoo bees of the genera Brachynomada, Nomada, Paranomada, and Triopasites have been found using Exomalopsis nests. The newly described cuckoo bee Nomada medellinenses moves into the nests of E. aburraensis and lays its eggs there.

Some species are hosts for parasitoid wasps of the family Mutillidae. E. solani is parasitized by the wasp Pseudomethoca bethae and E. fulvofasciata is host to at least two species of Timulla.

== Taxonomy ==
As of 2007 there were nearly 90 described species in the genus. There are many more species known that are still undescribed.

Species include:

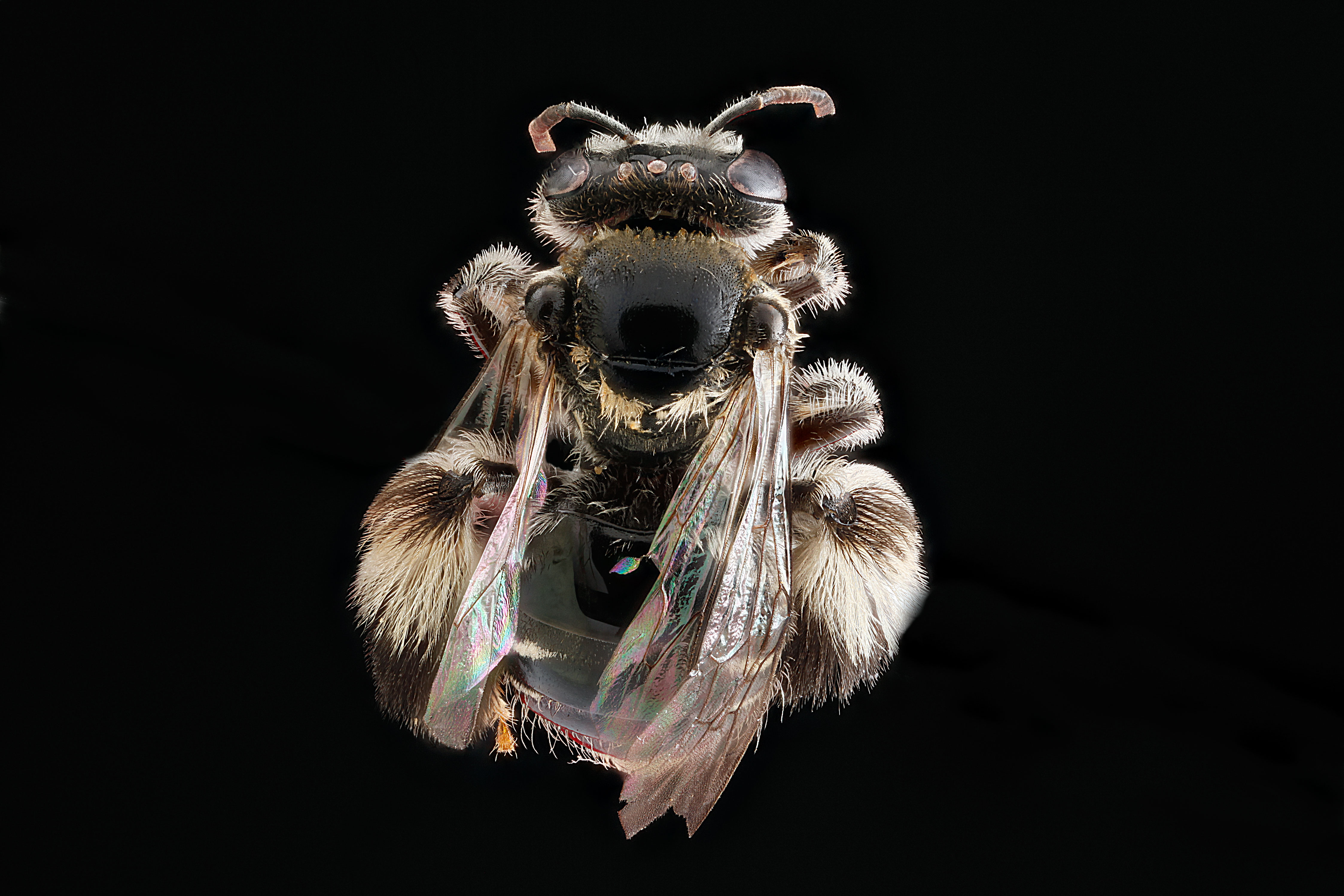
Exomalopsis pulchella

- Exomalopsis aburraensis
- Exomalopsis aequabilis
- Exomalopsis aequalis
- Exomalopsis affabilis
- Exomalopsis alexanderi
- Exomalopsis amoena
- Exomalopsis analis
- Exomalopsis apicalis
- Exomalopsis arcuata
- Exomalopsis atlantica
- Exomalopsis aureosericea
- Exomalopsis auropilosa
- Exomalopsis badioventris
- Exomalopsis bahamica
- Exomalopsis bakeri
- Exomalopsis bartschi
- Exomalopsis bechteli
- Exomalopsis bicellularis
- Exomalopsis binotata
- Exomalopsis birkmanni
- Exomalopsis boharti
- Exomalopsis bomanii
- Exomalopsis bruesi
- Exomalopsis byersi
- Exomalopsis callura
- Exomalopsis campestris
- Exomalopsis collaris
- Exomalopsis comitanensis
- Exomalopsis compta
- Exomalopsis dasypoda
- Exomalopsis digressa
- Exomalopsis dimidiata
- Exomalopsis diminuta
- Exomalopsis fernandoi
- Exomalopsis fulvihirta
- Exomalopsis fulvipennis
- Exomalopsis fulvofasciata
- Exomalopsis fumipennis
- Exomalopsis heteropilosa
- Exomalopsis hurdi
- Exomalopsis iridipennis
- Exomalopsis jenseni
- Exomalopsis limata
- Exomalopsis lissotera
- Exomalopsis mellipes
- Exomalopsis mexicana
- Exomalopsis minor
- Exomalopsis morelosensis
- Exomalopsis mourei
- Exomalopsis neglecta
- Exomalopsis nigrihirta
- Exomalopsis nigrior
- Exomalopsis notabilis
- Exomalopsis otomita
- Exomalopsis paitensis
- Exomalopsis paraguayensis
- Exomalopsis pilosa
- Exomalopsis planiceps
- Exomalopsis pubescens
- Exomalopsis pueblana
- Exomalopsis pulchella
- Exomalopsis robertsi
- Exomalopsis rufipes
- Exomalopsis rufitarsis
- Exomalopsis similis
- Exomalopsis snowi
- Exomalopsis solani
- Exomalopsis solidaginis
- Exomalopsis solitaria
- Exomalopsis sororcula
- Exomalopsis spangleri
- Exomalopsis subtilis
- Exomalopsis tarsalis
- Exomalopsis tepaneca
- Exomalopsis testacea
- Exomalopsis testaceinervis
- Exomalopsis tibialis
- Exomalopsis tomentosa
- Exomalopsis trifasciata
- Exomalopsis vernoniae
- Exomalopsis vincentana
- Exomalopsis ypirangensis
