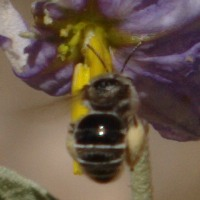

Scientific classification
- Kingdom: Animalia
- Phylum: Arthropoda
- Class: Insecta
- Order: Hymenoptera
- Family: Apidae
- Tribe: Exomalopsini
- Genus: Exomalopsis
- Species: E. solani

Binomial name
- Exomalopsis solani Cockerell, 1896

= Exomalopsis solani =

Species of bee

Exomalopsis solani is a species of bee in the family Apidae. It is found in Central America and North America.
