= Anthophorula persephone =

Anthophorula persephone Temporal range: Burdigalian?

Scientific classification
- Domain: Eukaryota
- Kingdom: Animalia
- Phylum: Arthropoda
- Class: Insecta
- Order: Hymenoptera
- Family: Apidae
- Genus: Anthophorula
- Subgenus: Anthophorula
- Species: †A. persephone

Binomial name
- †Anthophorula persephone Engel, 2012

Extinct species of bee

Anthophorula (Anthophorula) persephone is an extinct species of bee in the subfamily Apinae known from a pair of possibly Miocene fossils found on Hispaniola. A. persephone is the first species of the bee tribe Exomalopsini to have been described from fossils found in Dominican amber and is the only species of Anthophorula found in the West Indies.

== History and classification ==
Anthophorula persephone is known from two fossils insects which are inclusions in a single, transparent chunk of Dominican amber. The amber was produced by the extinct Hymenaea protera, which formerly grew on Hispaniola, across northern South America and up to southern Mexico. The amber specimen, number DR-KL1, which entombs the holotype and the additional partial adult, is currently preserved in the Division of Invertebrate Zoology collections at the American Museum of Natural History in New York City, United States. The holotype fossil is composed of a complete adult individual that was collected from an undetermined amber mine, in fossil bearing rocks of the Cordillera Septentrional mountains, northern Dominican Republic. The amber dates from at least the Burdigalian stage of the Miocene, based on studying the associated fossil foraminifera and may be as old as the Middle Eocene, based on the associated fossil coccoliths. This age range is due to the host rock being secondary deposits for the amber, and the Miocene the age range is only the youngest that it might be. The fossil was examined by a group of entomologists led by Michael S. Engel of the American Museum of Natural History. Engel and teams's 2012 type description of the new species was published in the journal American Museum Novitates. The specific epithet persephone is in reference to the goddess Persephone of Greek mythology.

== Description ==
The Anthophorula persephone holotype is a female with a total length of 6.1 millimetres (0.24 in) and a forewing length of 4.6 millimetres (0.18 in). The overall coloration of A. persephone is a mainly a dark tone, likely black, though the color does lighten to a dark brown on the legs and finally to a lighter brown on the spurs and claws of the legs. In contrast, the wings are hyaline with only the wings a dark brown color tone. It is noted that the forewing has a larger pterostigma than those found in the modern Anthophorula subgenus members, being wider than the marginal veins of the wing. The shape and bend of the marginal cell is typical for the tribe Exomalopsini, while the shape of the cells in the forewing and the simple structure of the mandibles are found only in the Anthophorula subgenus Anthophorula members.
