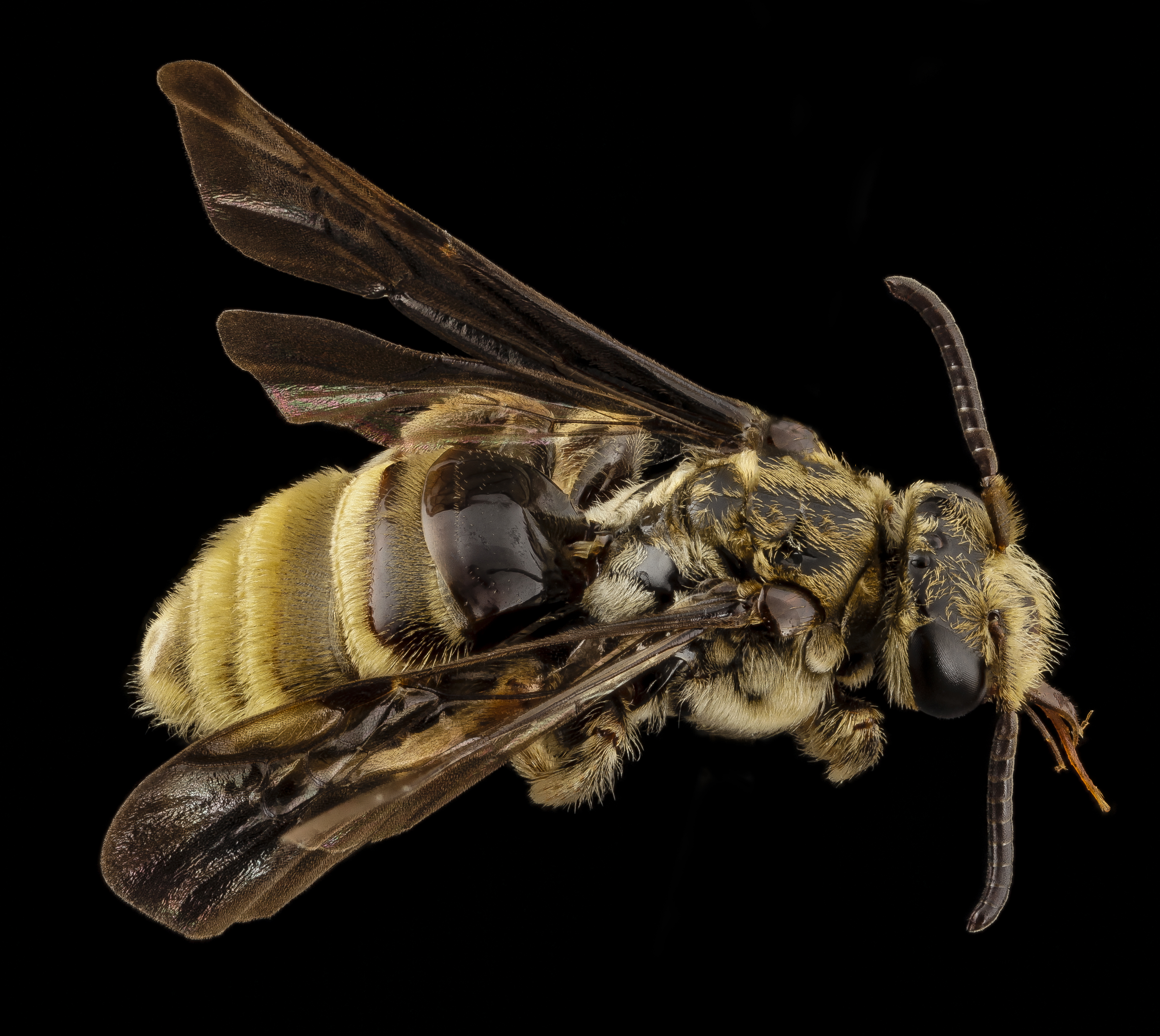

Scientific classification
- Domain: Eukaryota
- Kingdom: Animalia
- Phylum: Arthropoda
- Class: Insecta
- Order: Hymenoptera
- Family: Apidae
- Tribe: Brachynomadini
- Genus: Paranomada
- Species: P. velutina

Binomial name
- Paranomada velutina Linsley, 1939

= Paranomada velutina =

Species of bee

Paranomada velutina is a species of cuckoo bee in the family Apidae. It is found in the United States and Mexico.

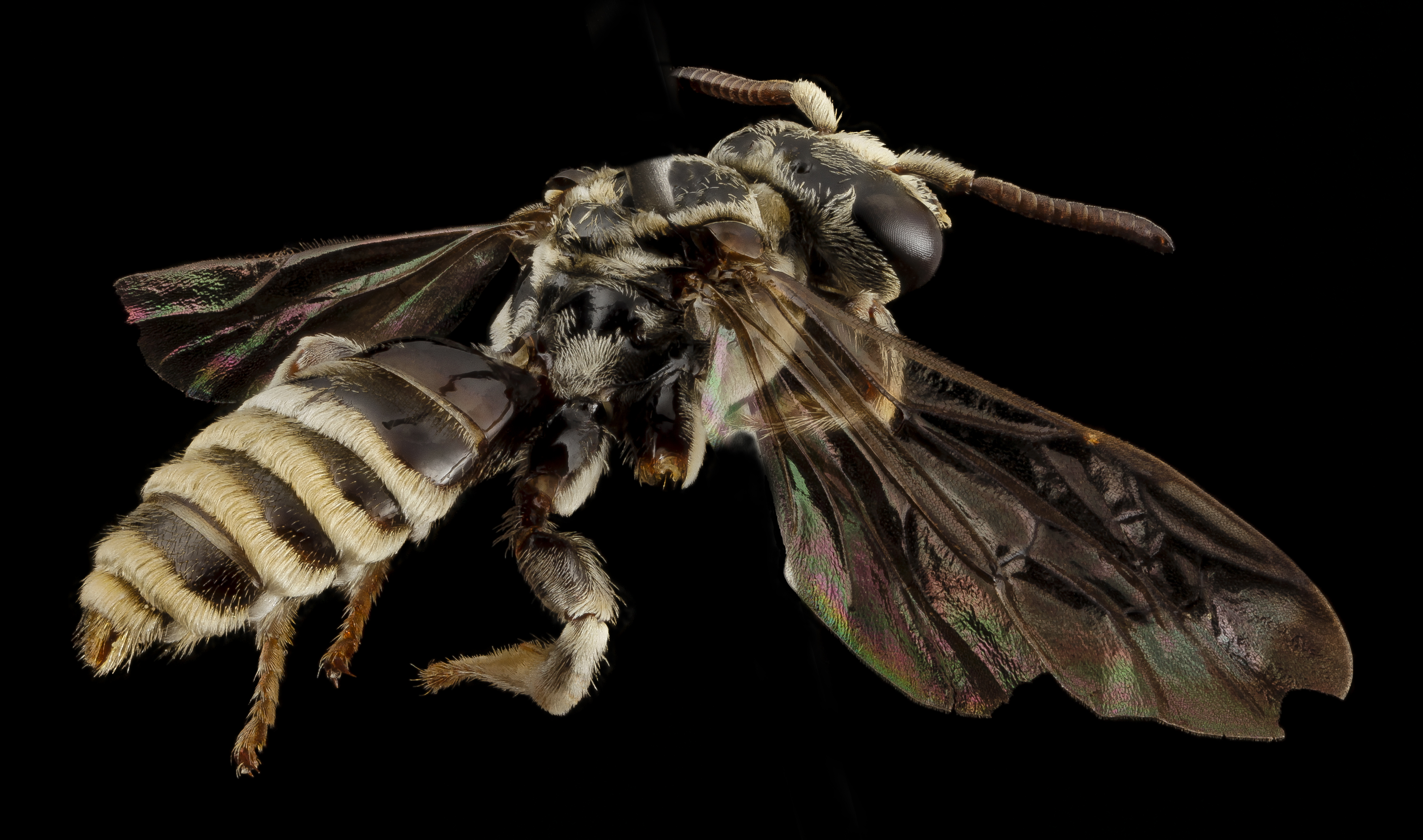
