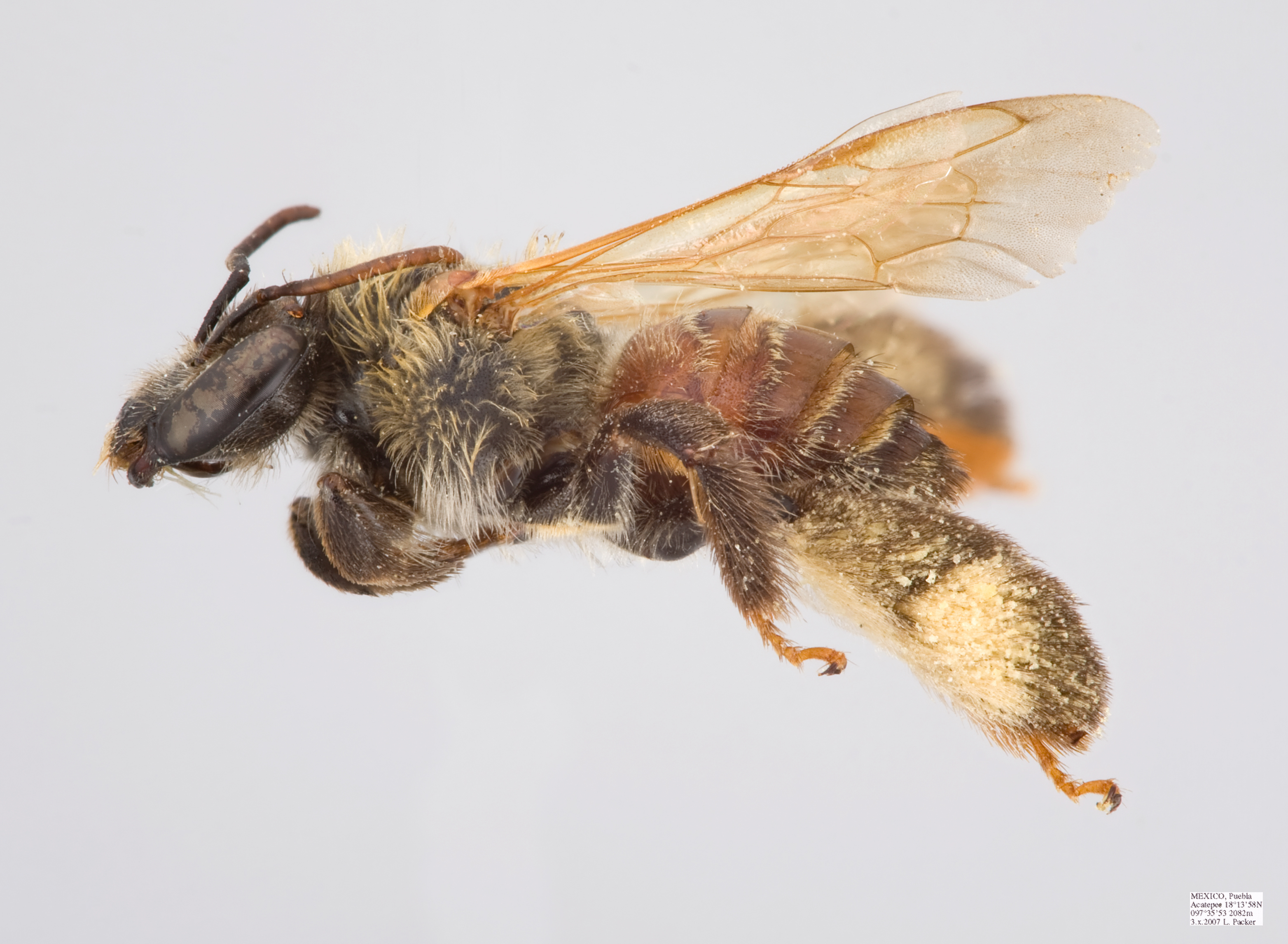

Scientific classification
- Domain: Eukaryota
- Kingdom: Animalia
- Phylum: Arthropoda
- Class: Insecta
- Order: Hymenoptera
- Family: Apidae
- Genus: Exomalopsis
- Species: E. mellipes

Binomial name
- Exomalopsis mellipes Cresson, 1878

Synonyms
- Exomalopsis frederici Cockerell, 1914

= Exomalopsis mellipes =

Species of bee

Exomalopsis mellipes is a species of bee in the family Apidae. It is found in Central America and North America.
