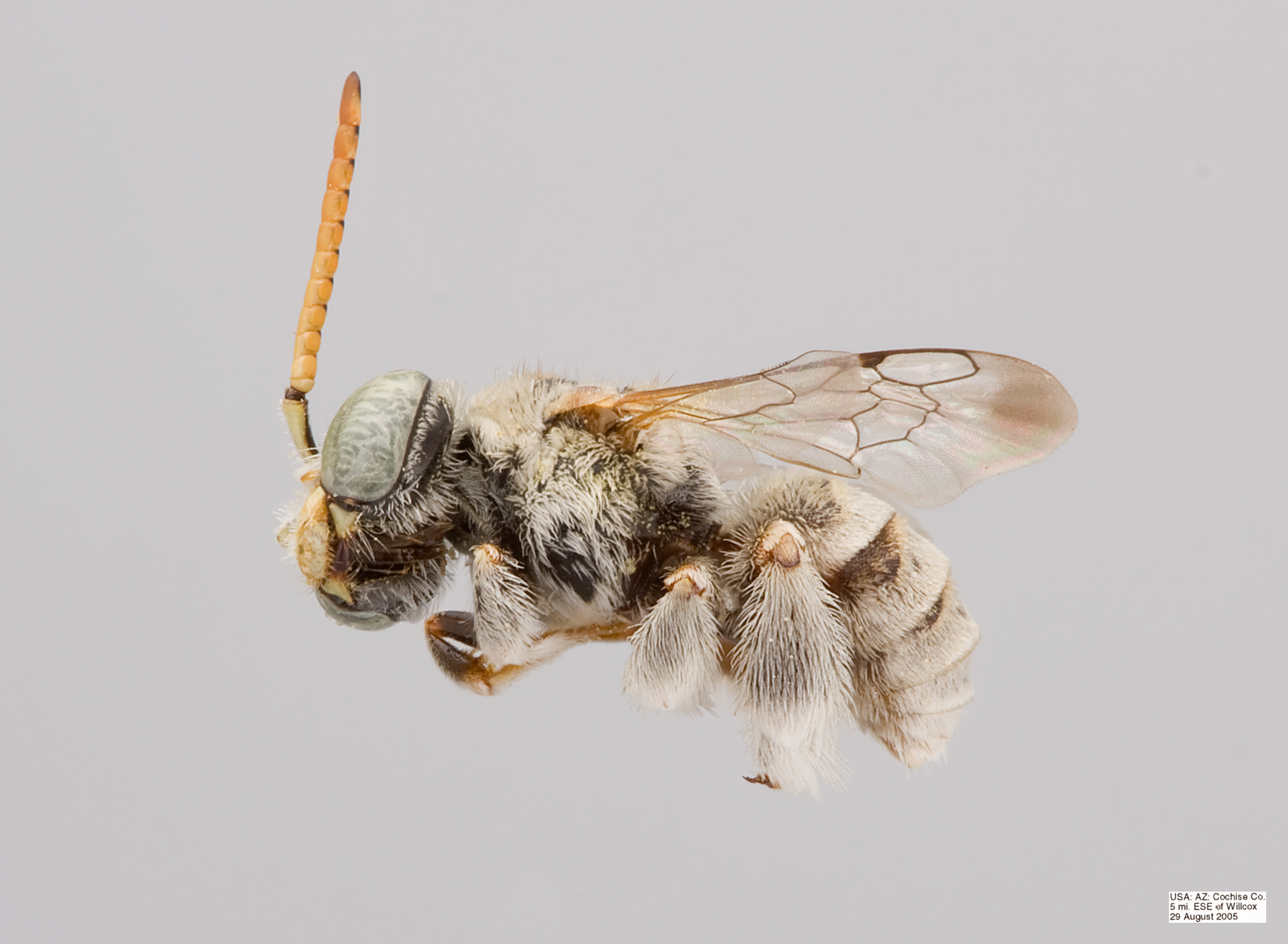
- Anthophorula compactula

Scientific classification
- Domain: Eukaryota
- Kingdom: Animalia
- Phylum: Arthropoda
- Class: Insecta
- Order: Hymenoptera
- Family: Apidae
- Subfamily: Apinae
- Tribe: Exomalopsini
- Genus: Anthophorula; Cockerell, 1897

= Anthophorula =

Genus of bees

Anthophorula is a genus of bees in the family Apidae. There are more than 60 described species in Anthophorula.

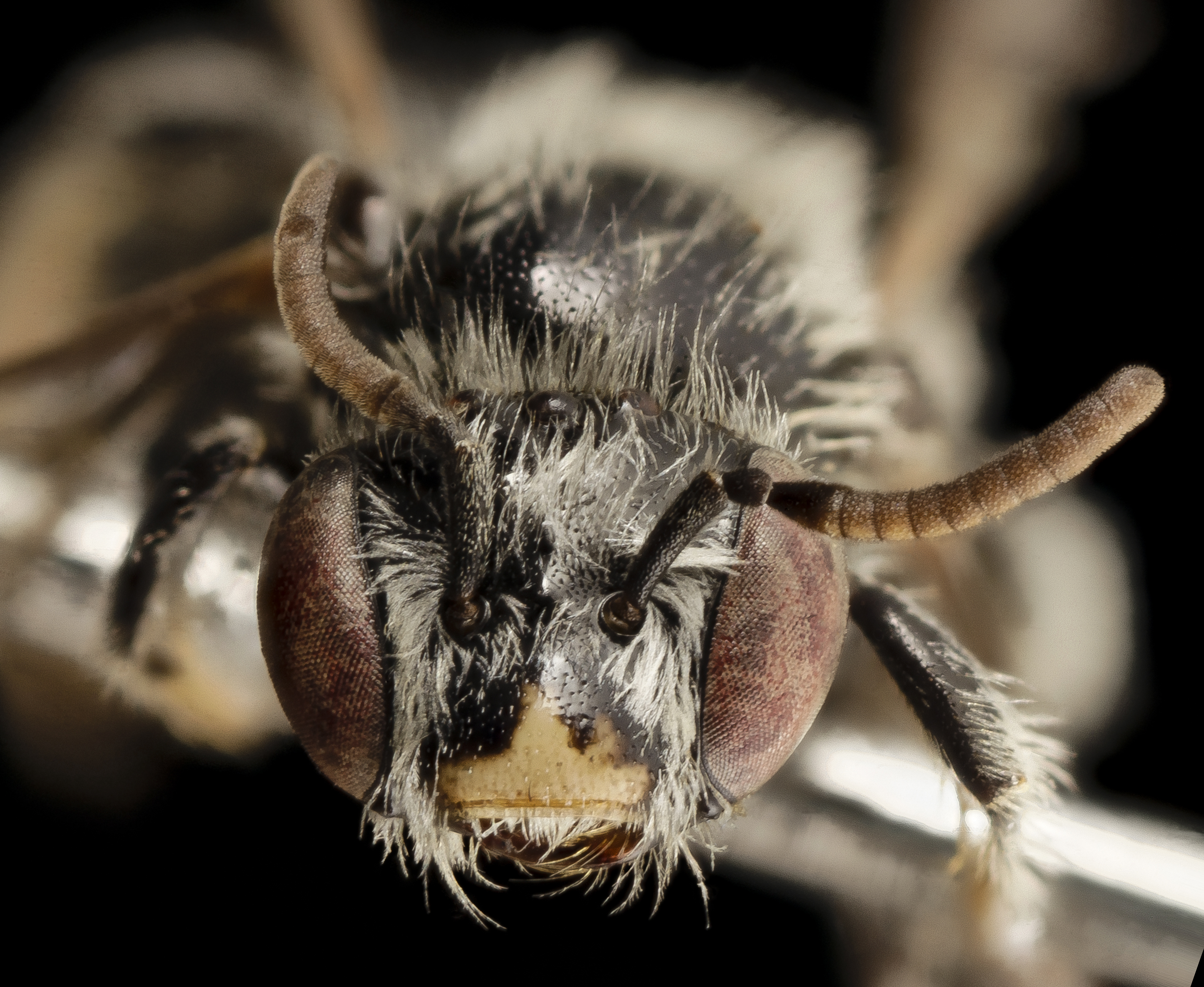
Anthophorula micheneri

== Species ==
These 65 species belong to the genus Anthophorula:

- Anthophorula albata (Timberlake, 1947)
- Anthophorula albicans (Provancher, 1896)
- Anthophorula albovestita (Timberlake, 1947)
- Anthophorula albovittata (Cockerell, 1918)
- Anthophorula asteris (Mitchell, 1962)
- Anthophorula beameri (Timberlake, 1980)
- Anthophorula brevicornis (Timberlake, 1980)
- Anthophorula centralis (Timberlake, 1980)
- Anthophorula cerei (Timberlake, 1947)
- Anthophorula chionura (Cockerell, 1925)
- Anthophorula chlorina (Cockerell, 1918)
- Anthophorula cockerelli (Timberlake, 1980)
- Anthophorula compactula Cockerell, 1897
- Anthophorula completa (Cockerell, 1935)
- Anthophorula consobrina (Timberlake, 1980)
- Anthophorula cornigera (Cockerell, 1922)
- Anthophorula crassicornis (Timberlake, 1980)
- Anthophorula crenulata (Timberlake, 1980)
- Anthophorula deserticola (Timberlake, 1947)
- Anthophorula eriogoni (Timberlake, 1947)
- Anthophorula euphorbiae (Timberlake, 1947)
- Anthophorula exilis (Timberlake, 1980)
- Anthophorula fuscicornis (Timberlake, 1980)
- Anthophorula gracilicornis (Timberlake, 1980)
- Anthophorula gutierreziae (Timberlake, 1947)
- Anthophorula halli (Timberlake, 1980)
- Anthophorula ignota (Timberlake, 1980)
- Anthophorula imparilis (Timberlake, 1980)
- Anthophorula interrupta (Timberlake, 1980)
- Anthophorula laticincta (Timberlake, 1980)
- Anthophorula levigata (Timberlake, 1980)
- Anthophorula linsleyi (Timberlake, 1980)
- Anthophorula macrodonta González-Vaquero & Roig-Alsina, 2005
- Anthophorula micheneri (Timberlake, 1947)
- Anthophorula minima (Timberlake, 1980)
- Anthophorula morgani Cockerell, 1914
- Anthophorula morula (Timberlake, 1980)
- Anthophorula nevadensis (Timberlake, 1980)
- Anthophorula nitens (Cockerell, 1915)
- Anthophorula niveata (Friese, 1908)
- Anthophorula oaxacana (Timberlake, 1980)
- Anthophorula pallidicornis (Timberlake, 1980)
- Anthophorula palmarum (Timberlake, 1947)
- Anthophorula parva (Timberlake, 1980)
- Anthophorula punctatissima (Timberlake, 1980)
- Anthophorula pygmaea (Cresson, 1872)
- Anthophorula robustula (Timberlake, 1980)
- Anthophorula rozeni (Timberlake, 1980)
- Anthophorula rufiventris (Timberlake, 1947)
- Anthophorula scapalis (Timberlake, 1980)
- Anthophorula sculleni (Timberlake, 1980)
- Anthophorula serrata (Friese, 1899)
- Anthophorula sidae (Cockerell, 1897)
- Anthophorula snellingi (Timberlake, 1980)
- Anthophorula sonorensis (Timberlake, 1980)
- Anthophorula subcrassicornis (Timberlake, 1980)
- Anthophorula texana (Friese, 1899)
- Anthophorula torticornis (Cockerell, 1927)
- Anthophorula tricinctula (Timberlake, 1980)
- Anthophorula truncata González-Vaquero & Roig-Alsina, 2005
- Anthophorula uncicornis González-Vaquero & Roig-Alsina, 2005
- Anthophorula unicornis González-Vaquero & Roig-Alsina, 2005
- Anthophorula varleyi (Timberlake, 1947)
- Anthophorula yoloensis (Timberlake, 1980)
- † Anthophorula persephone Engel, 2012
