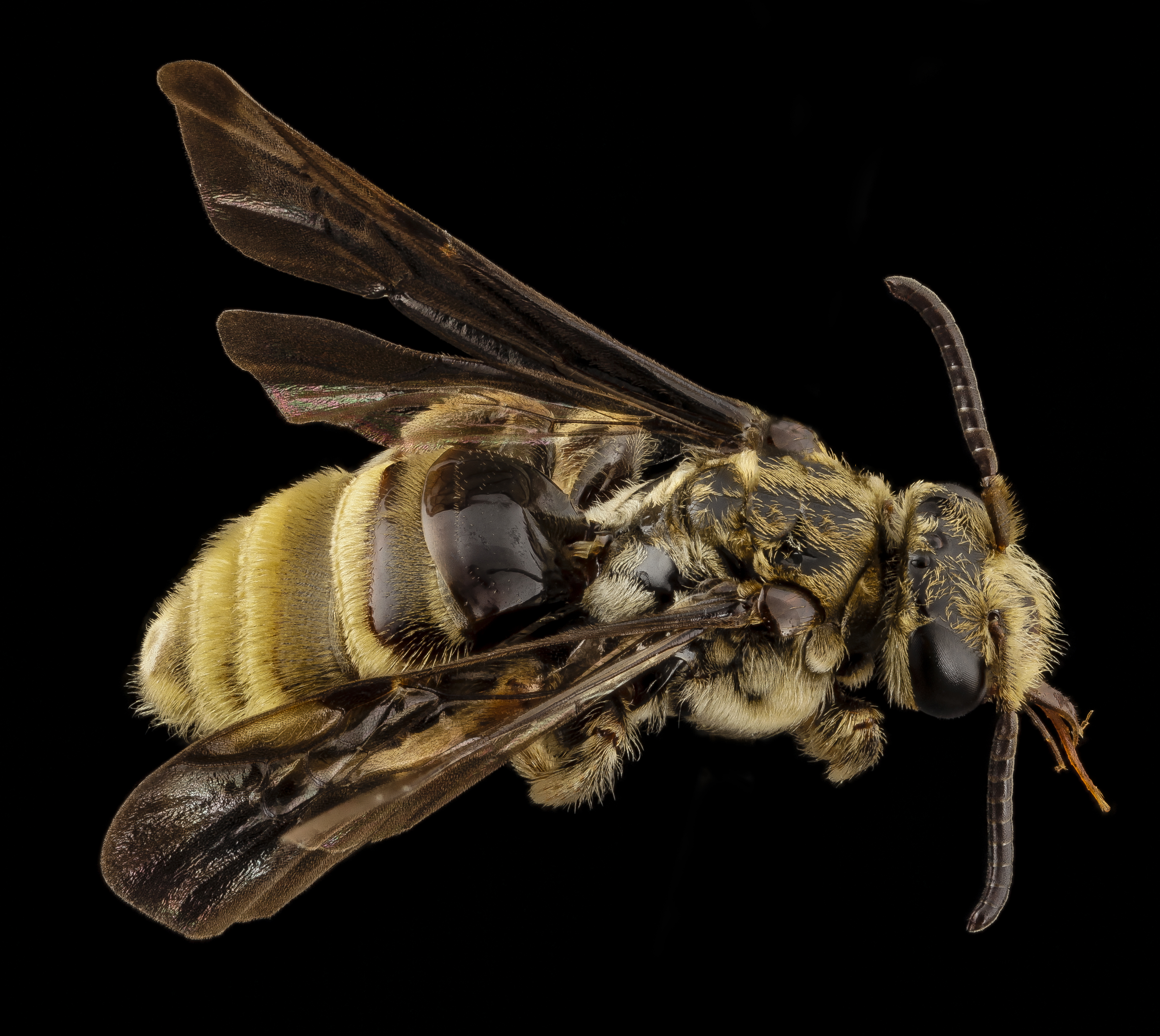
- Paranomada velutina

Scientific classification
- Domain: Eukaryota
- Kingdom: Animalia
- Phylum: Arthropoda
- Class: Insecta
- Order: Hymenoptera
- Family: Apidae
- Subfamily: Nomadinae
- Tribe: Brachynomadini
- Genus: Paranomada; Linsley & Michener, 1937

= Paranomada =

Genus of bees

Paranomada is a genus of cuckoo bees in the family Apidae. There are at least three described species in Paranomada.

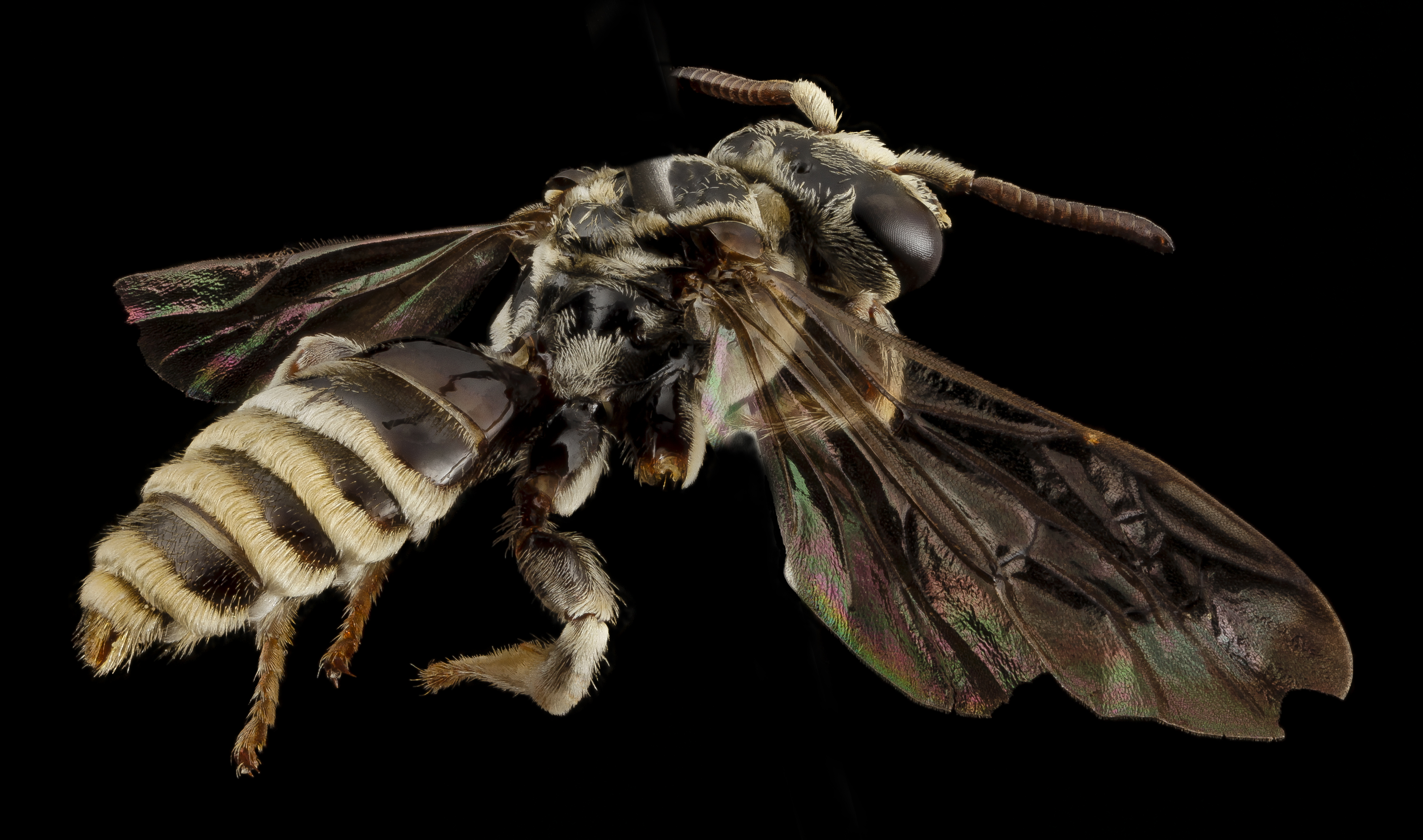
Paranomada velutina

== Species ==
These three species belong to the genus Paranomada:

- Paranomada californica Linsley, 1945
- Paranomada nitida Linsley & Michener, 1937
- Paranomada velutina Linsley, 1939
