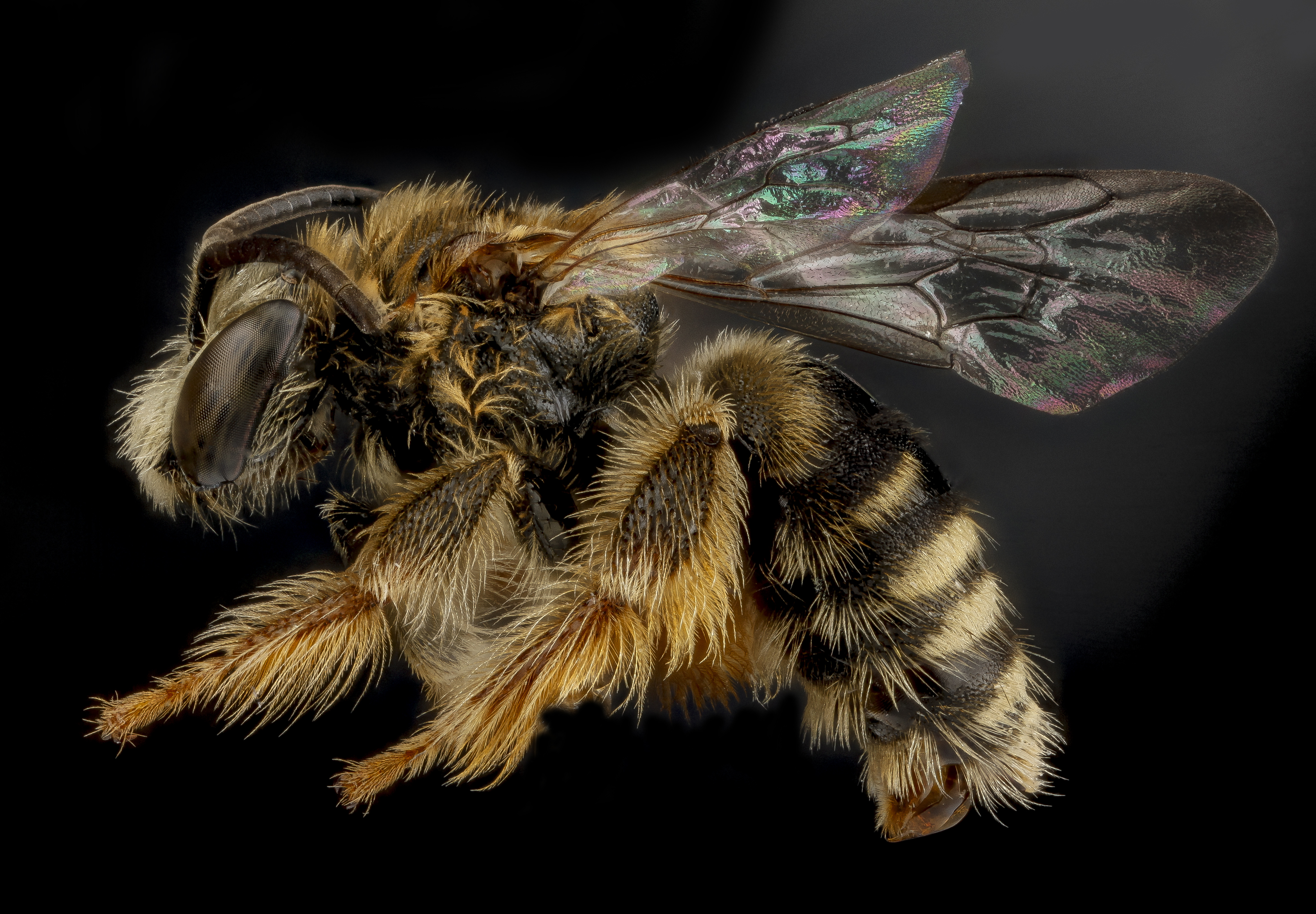
- Exomalopsis analis

Scientific classification
- Kingdom: Animalia
- Phylum: Arthropoda
- Clade: Pancrustacea
- Class: Insecta
- Order: Hymenoptera
- Family: Apidae
- Subfamily: Apinae
- Tribe: Exomalopsini; Michener, 1944

= Exomalopsini =

Tribe of bees

The Exomalopsini are a tribe of bees in the family Apidae. They are tiny to moderate in size and usually hairy. The abdomen often has pale banding. They can be distinguished from other tribes by a line of hairs along the inner edge of the eye.

== Genera ==
- Anthophorula
- Exomalopsis
