= Rhopalolemma rotundiceps =

Scientific classification
- Domain: Eukaryota
- Kingdom: Animalia
- Phylum: Arthropoda
- Class: Insecta
- Order: Hymenoptera
- Family: Apidae
- Tribe: Neolarrini
- Genus: Rhopalolemma
- Species: R. rotundiceps

Binomial name
- Rhopalolemma rotundiceps Roig-Alsina, 1997

Species of bee

Rhopalolemma rotundiceps is a species of cuckoo bee in the family Apidae. It is found in North America.
