= Neolarra californica =

Scientific classification
- Domain: Eukaryota
- Kingdom: Animalia
- Phylum: Arthropoda
- Class: Insecta
- Order: Hymenoptera
- Family: Apidae
- Tribe: Neolarrini
- Genus: Neolarra
- Species: N. californica

Binomial name
- Neolarra californica Michener, 1939

Species of bee

Neolarra californica is a species of cuckoo bee in the family Apidae. It is found in the United States and Mexico. The species can be found in nests of Perdita difficilis bees.
