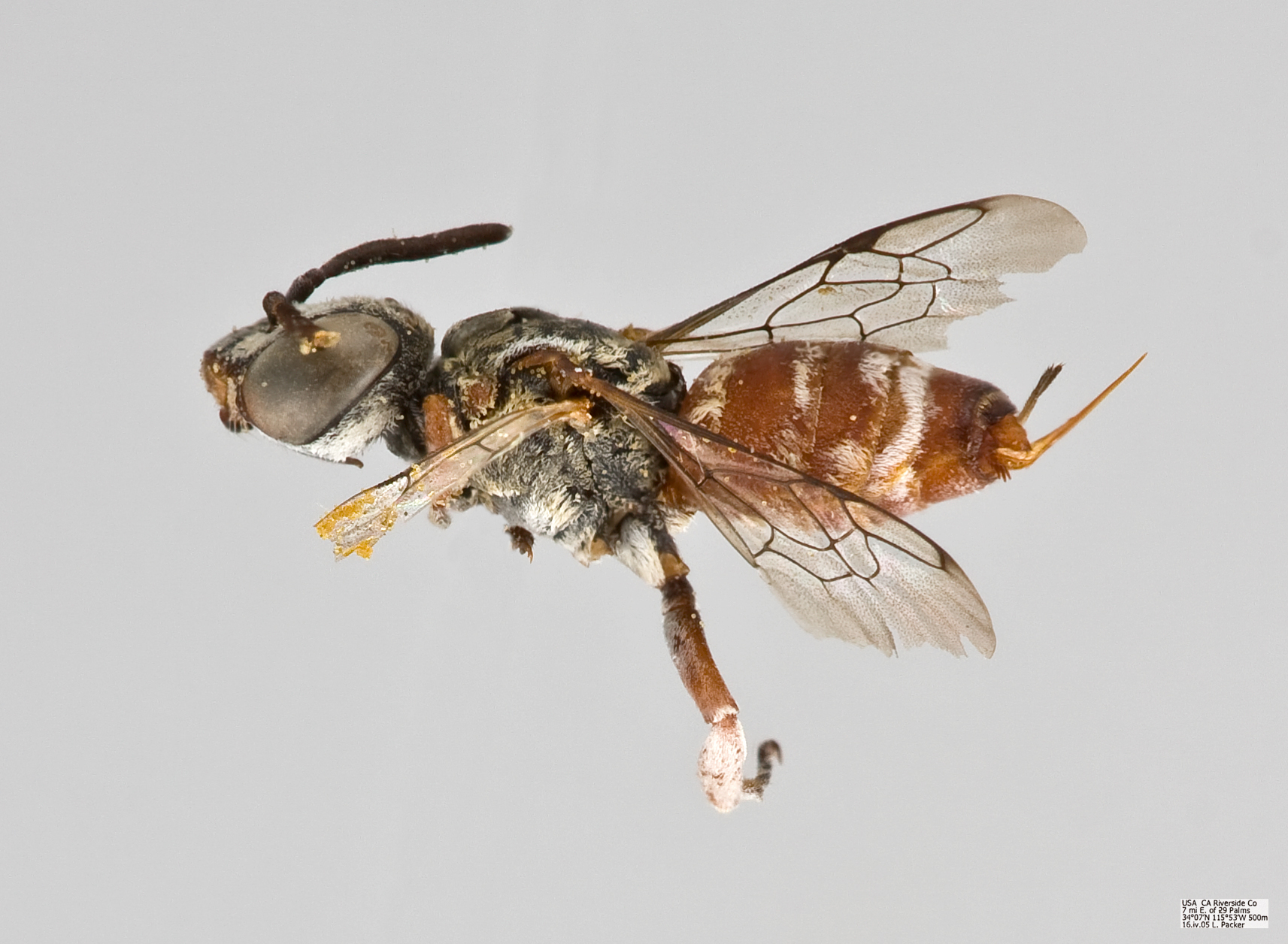

Scientific classification
- Kingdom: Animalia
- Phylum: Arthropoda
- Clade: Pancrustacea
- Class: Insecta
- Order: Hymenoptera
- Family: Apidae
- Tribe: Neolarrini
- Genus: Townsendiella
- Species: T. pulchra

Binomial name
- Townsendiella pulchra Crawford, 1916

= Townsendiella pulchra =

Species of bee

Townsendiella pulchra is a species of cuckoo bee in the family Apidae. It is found in the United States and Mexico. It is a kleptoparasite of Hesperapis larreae.
