= Biastes fulviventris =

Scientific classification
- Domain: Eukaryota
- Kingdom: Animalia
- Phylum: Arthropoda
- Class: Insecta
- Order: Hymenoptera
- Family: Apidae
- Tribe: Neolarrini
- Genus: Biastes
- Species: B. fulviventris

Binomial name
- Biastes fulviventris (Cresson, 1878)

Species of bee

Biastes fulviventris is a species of cuckoo bee in the family Apidae, in the subgenus Neopasites.
