= Biastes mojavensis =

Scientific classification
- Domain: Eukaryota
- Kingdom: Animalia
- Phylum: Arthropoda
- Class: Insecta
- Order: Hymenoptera
- Family: Apidae
- Tribe: Neolarrini
- Genus: Biastes
- Species: B. mojavensis

Binomial name
- Biastes mojavensis (Linsley, 1943)

Species of bee

Biastes mojavensis is a species of cuckoo bee in the family Apidae, in the subgenus Neopasites. It is found in North America.
