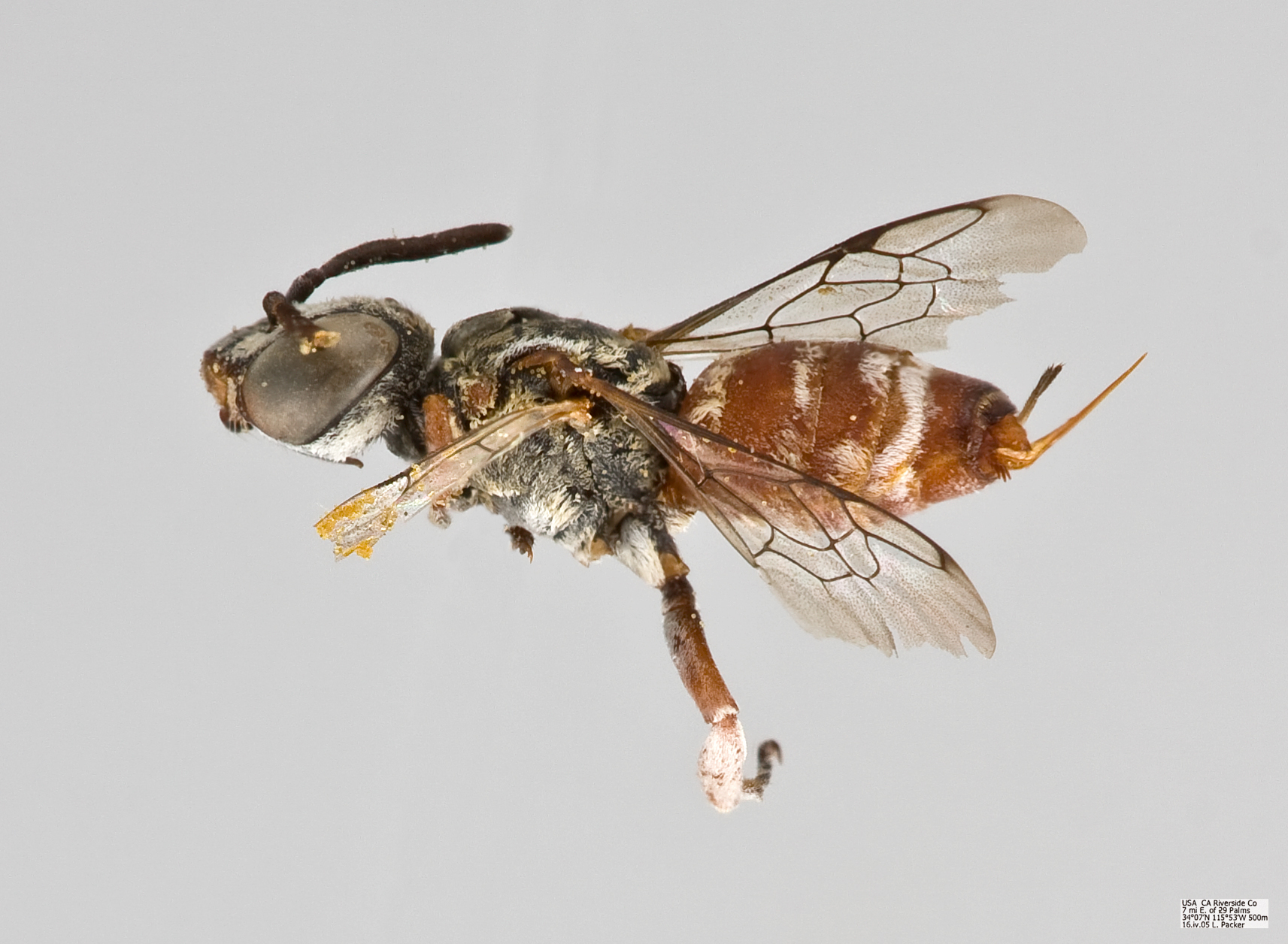
- Townsendiella pulchra

Scientific classification
- Kingdom: Animalia
- Phylum: Arthropoda
- Class: Insecta
- Order: Hymenoptera
- Family: Apidae
- Subfamily: Nomadinae
- Tribe: Neolarrini
- Genus: Townsendiella; Crawford, 1916

Synonyms
- Eremopasites Linsley, 1942; Xeropasites Linsley, 1942

= Townsendiella =

Genus of bees

Townsendiella is a genus of cuckoo bees in the family Apidae, found in Mexico, and the southwestern United States.

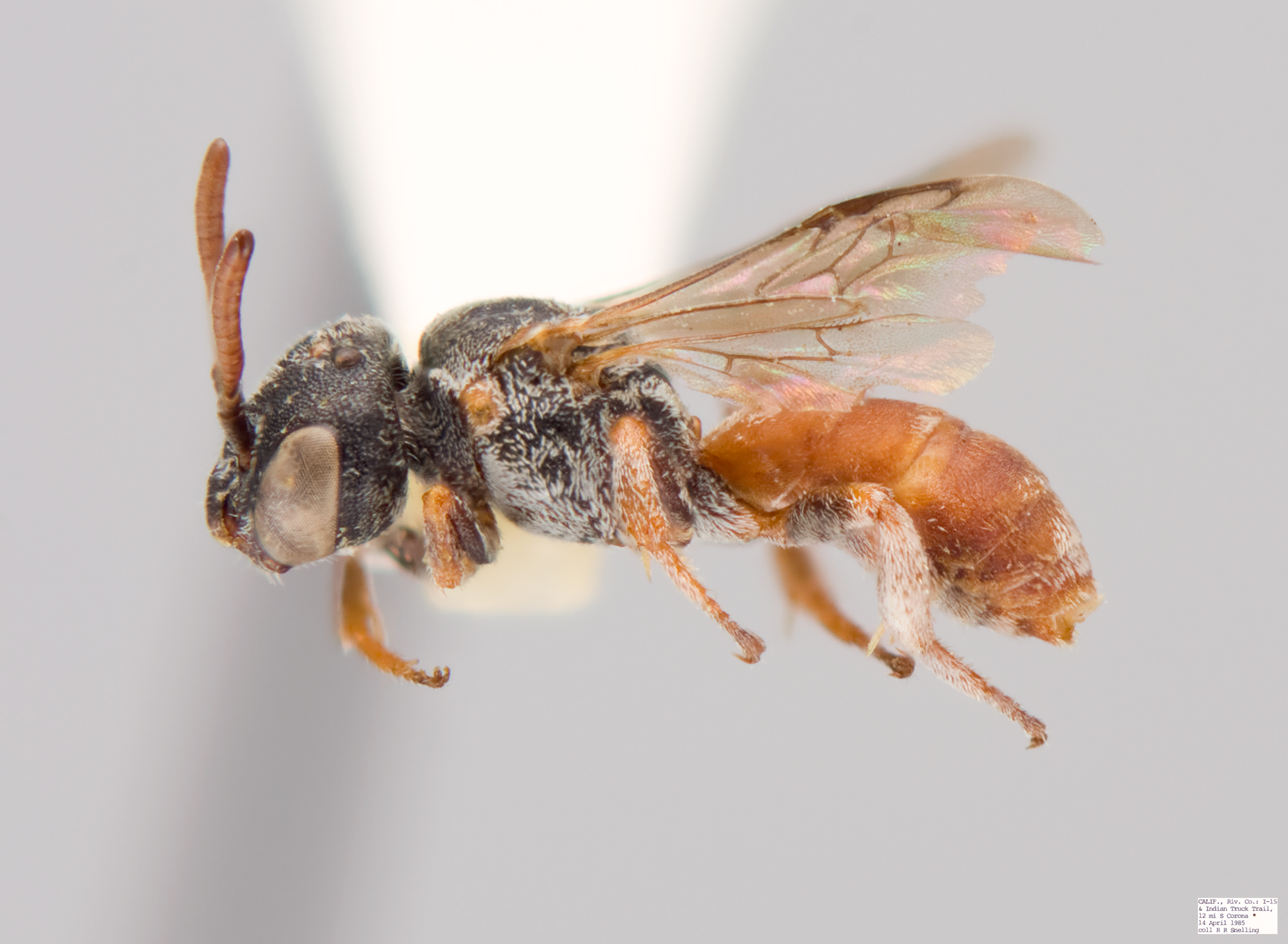
Townsendiella rufiventris

== Species ==
- Townsendiella californica Michener, 1936
- Townsendiella ensifera Orr and Griswold, 2015
- Townsendiella pulchra Crawford, 1916
- Townsendiella rufiventris Linsley, 1942
