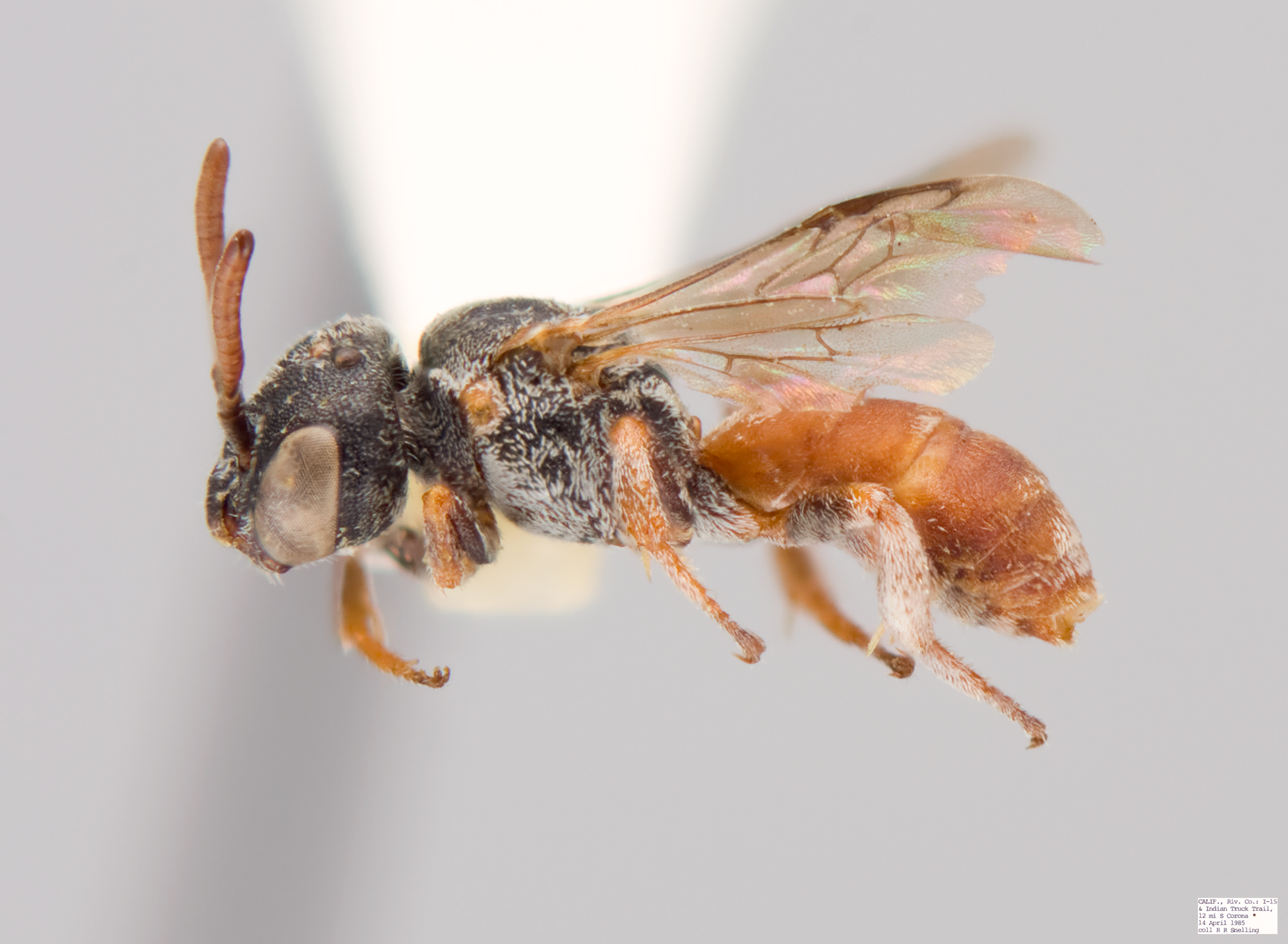

Scientific classification
- Domain: Eukaryota
- Kingdom: Animalia
- Phylum: Arthropoda
- Class: Insecta
- Order: Hymenoptera
- Family: Apidae
- Genus: Townsendiella
- Species: T. rufiventris

Binomial name
- Townsendiella rufiventris Linsley, 1942

= Townsendiella rufiventris =

Species of bee

Townsendiella rufiventris is a cuckoo bee species in the family Apidae. It is found in the United States and Mexico.
