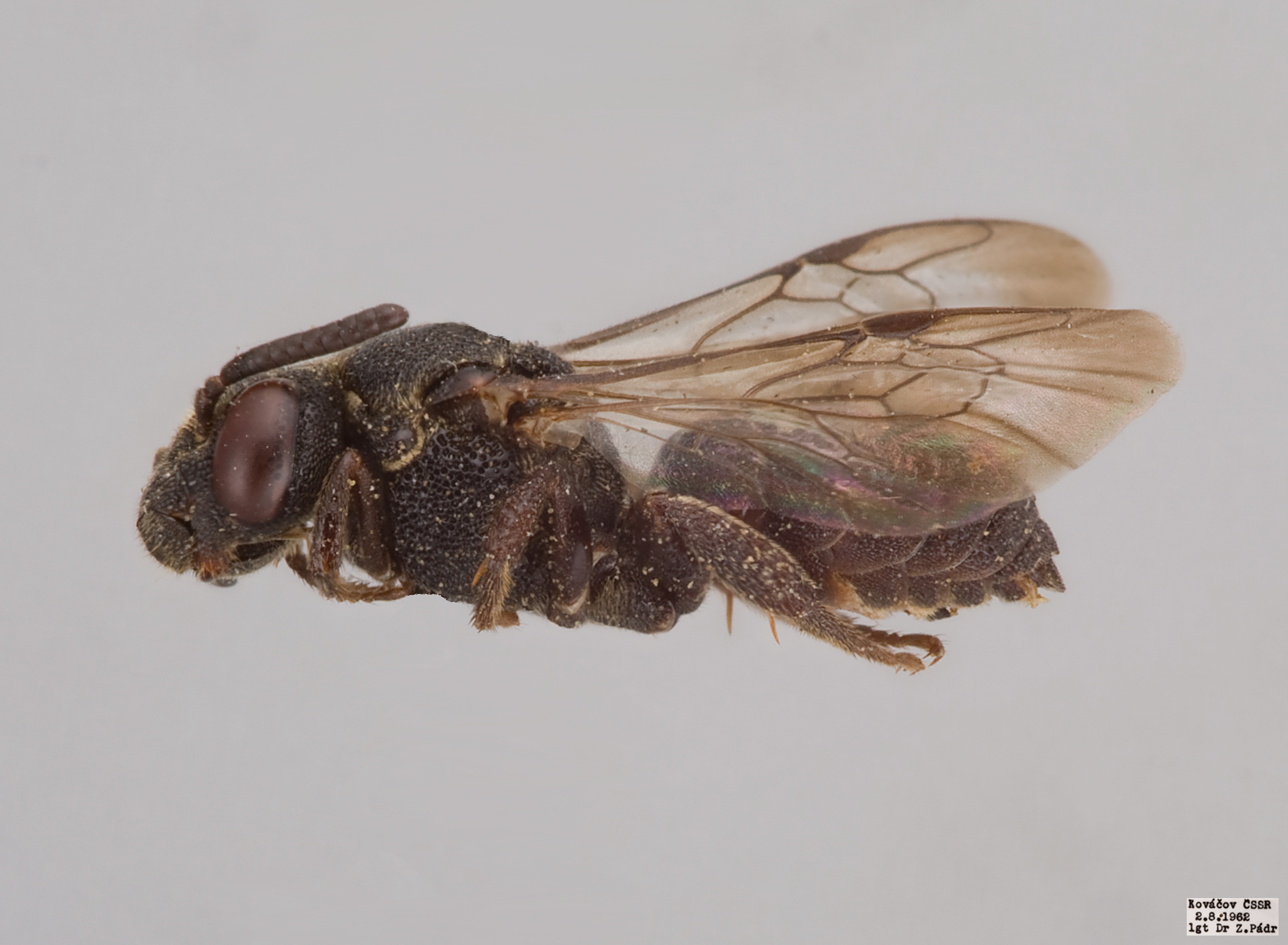
- Biastes brevicornis (male)

Scientific classification
- Kingdom: Animalia
- Phylum: Arthropoda
- Class: Insecta
- Order: Hymenoptera
- Family: Apidae
- Tribe: Neolarrini
- Genus: Biastes; Panzer, 1806

= Biastes (bee) =

Genus of bees

Biastes is a genus of cuckoo bees belonging to the family Apidae. Its constituency has been expanded to include species formerly treated in the genus Neopasites, now a subgenus within Biastes.

== Subgenera and species ==
- Subgenus Biastes s.s.
  - Biastes brevicornis (Panzer, 1798)
  - Biastes emarginatus (Schenck, 1853)
- Subgenus Melittoxena Morawitz, 1876
  - Biastes popovi Proshchalykin and Lelej, 2004
  - Biastes schmidti Heinrich, 1977
  - Biastes truncatus (Nylander, 1848)
- Subgenus Neopasites Ashmead, 1898
  - Biastes cressoni (Crawford, 1916)
  - Biastes fulviventris (Cresson, 1878)
  - Biastes mojavensis (Linsley, 1943)
  - Biastes sierrae (Linsley, 1943)
  - Biastes timberlakei (Linsley, 1943)
