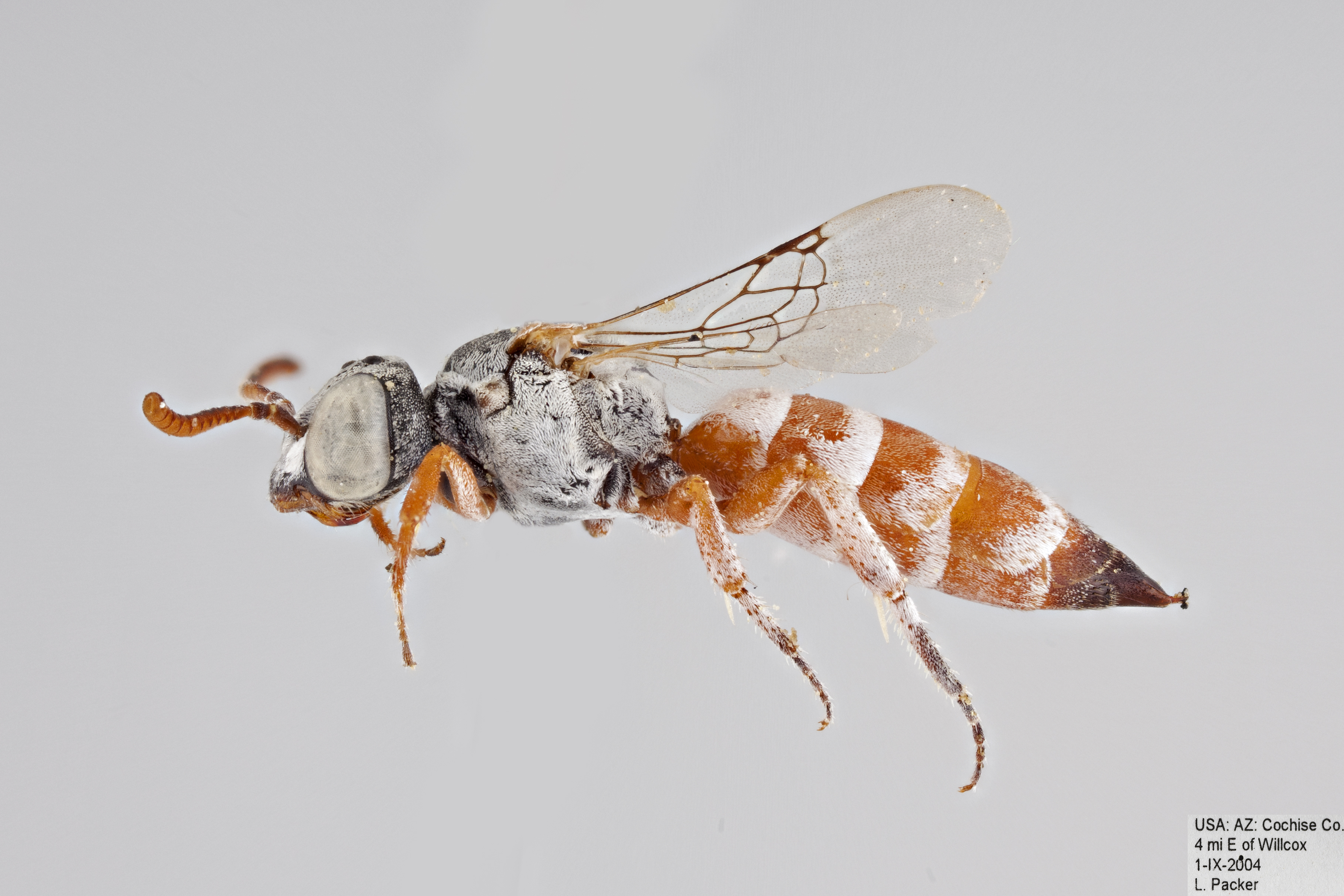
- Neolarra verbesinae female

Scientific classification
- Domain: Eukaryota
- Kingdom: Animalia
- Phylum: Arthropoda
- Class: Insecta
- Order: Hymenoptera
- Family: Apidae
- Genus: Neolarra
- Species: N. verbesinae

Binomial name
- Neolarra verbesinae (Cockerell, 1895)

= Neolarra verbesinae =

Species of bee

Neolarra verbesinae is a species of cuckoo bee in the family Apidae. It is found in North America.
