= Rhopalolemma =

Scientific classification
- Domain: Eukaryota
- Kingdom: Animalia
- Phylum: Arthropoda
- Class: Insecta
- Order: Hymenoptera
- Family: Apidae
- Subfamily: Nomadinae
- Tribe: Neolarrini
- Genus: Rhopalolemma; Roig-Alsina, 1991

Genus of bees

Rhopalolemma is a genus of cuckoo bees in the family Apidae. There are at least two described species in Rhopalolemma.

== Species ==
These two species belong to the genus Rhopalolemma:

- Rhopalolemma robertsi Roig-Alsina, 1991
- Rhopalolemma rotundiceps Roig-Alsina, 1997
