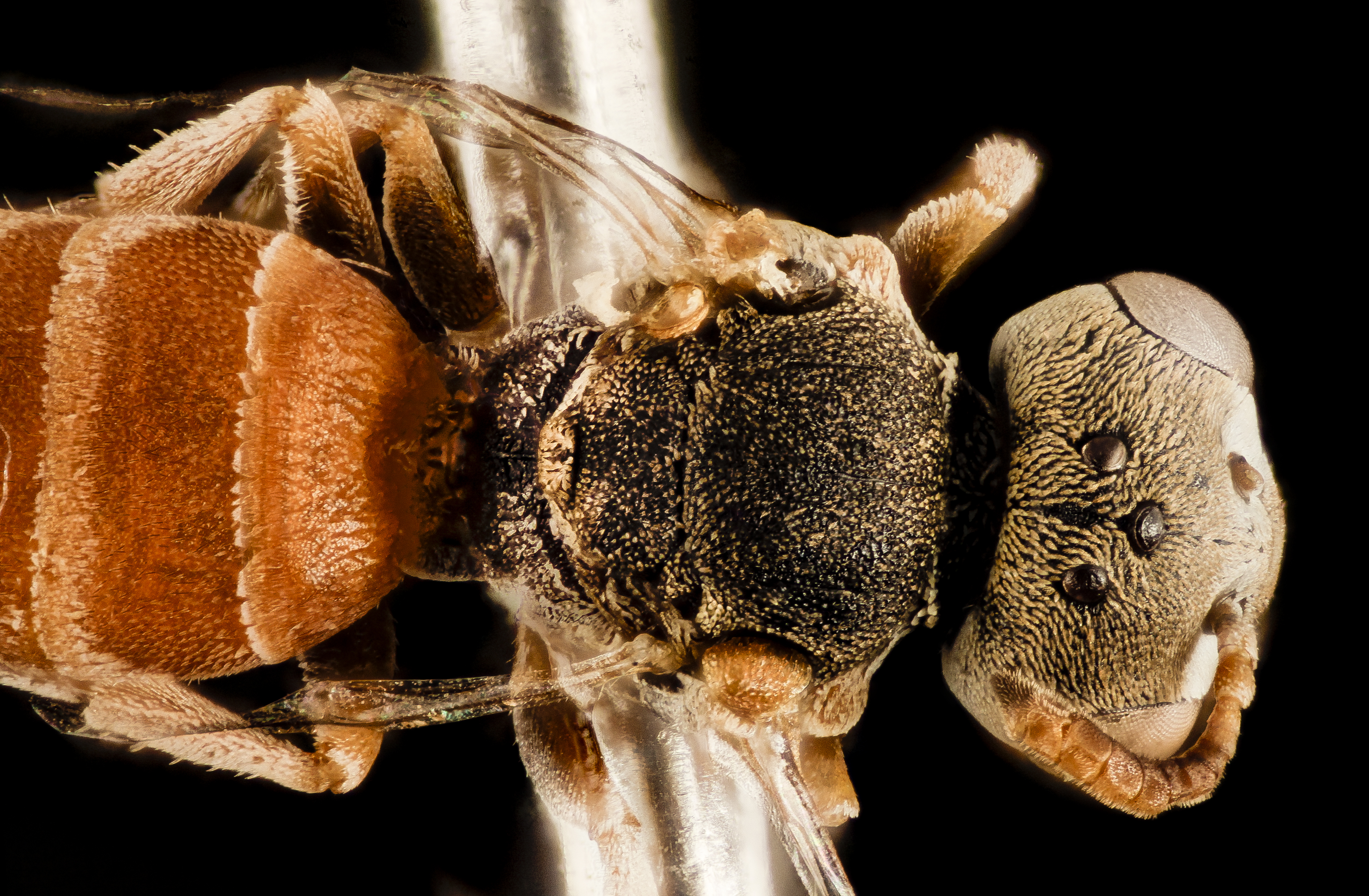

Scientific classification
- Kingdom: Animalia
- Phylum: Arthropoda
- Class: Insecta
- Order: Hymenoptera
- Family: Apidae
- Genus: Neolarra
- Species: N. vigilans

Binomial name
- Neolarra vigilans (Cockerell, 1895)

= Neolarra vigilans =

Species of bee

Neolarra vigilans is a kleptoparasitic species of cuckoo bee in the family Apidae. It is found from northern Mexico to southern Canada.

Its range was extended northward by several hundred miles after Michael and Dan O'Loughlin discovered a specimen on a friend's lawn in Burns, Oregon.
