= Neolarra cockerelli =

Scientific classification
- Domain: Eukaryota
- Kingdom: Animalia
- Phylum: Arthropoda
- Class: Insecta
- Order: Hymenoptera
- Family: Apidae
- Genus: Neolarra
- Species: N. cockerelli

Binomial name
- Neolarra cockerelli (Crawford, 1916)

Synonyms
- Macroglossapis cockerelli; Phileremulus cockerelli

Species of bee

Neolarra cockerelli is a species of cuckoo bee in the family Apidae. It is quite small and extremely rare. It is distributed from Texas to Tennessee and Georgia in the United States. The wing has only one submarginal cell.

== Morphology ==
=== Female ===
Female bees of this species are 3.5 mm long, with a mainly-black head and thorax and a testaceous (brick-colored) abdomen darkening at the tip. Their mandibles are yellowish, narrowly red on the apex; their antennae are yellowish beneath and brownish above. The basal (lower) segments of the legs are dark, and the tibiae and tarsi segments are also testaceous. The mid and hind spurs are pale yellowish. The wings are subhyaline, or imperfectly transparent, with yellowish to pitch-colored veins.
