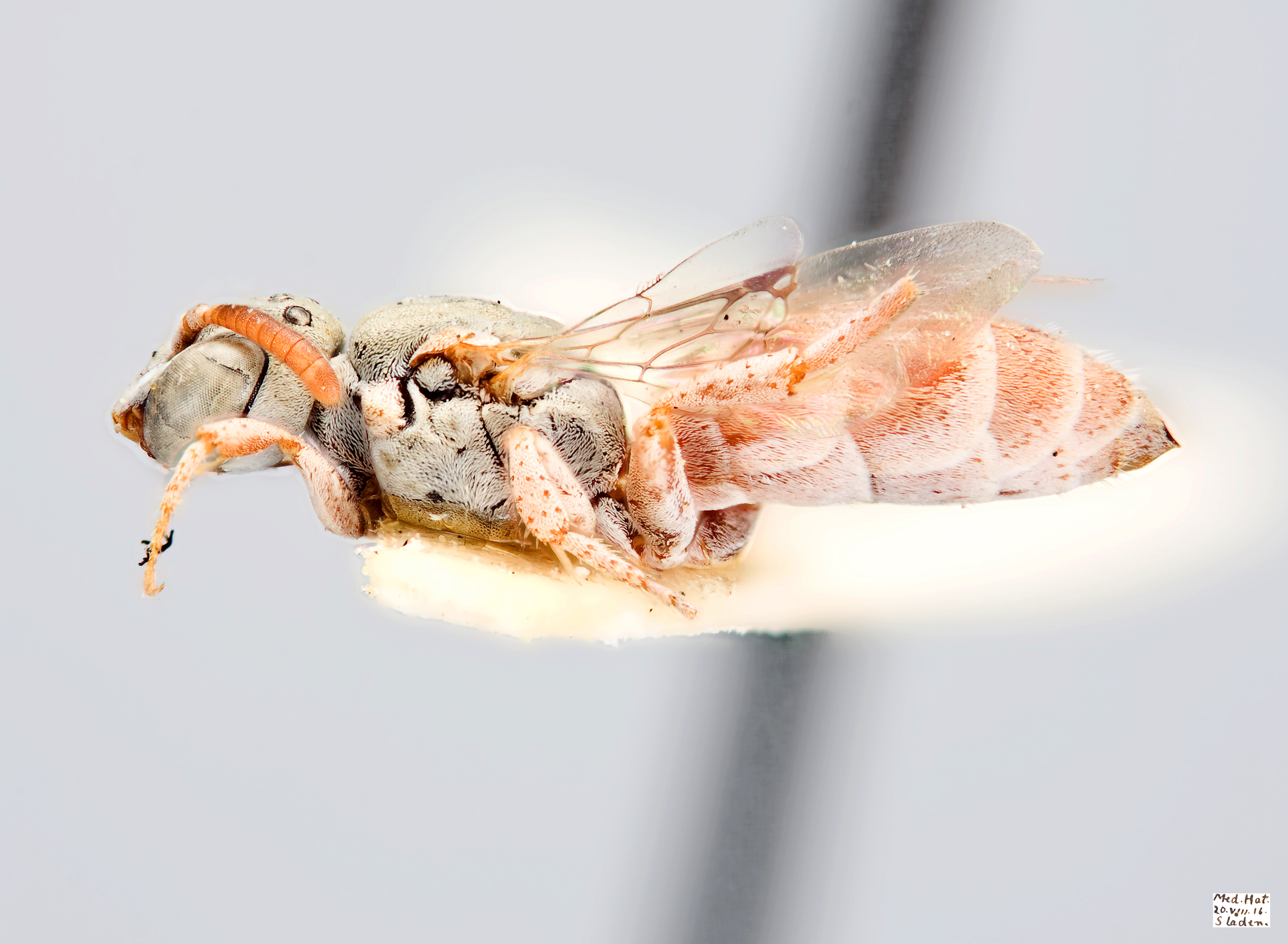
- Neolarra pruinosa female

Scientific classification
- Kingdom: Animalia
- Phylum: Arthropoda
- Clade: Pancrustacea
- Class: Insecta
- Order: Hymenoptera
- Family: Apidae
- Subfamily: Nomadinae
- Tribe: Neolarrini
- Genus: Neolarra; Ashmead, 1890

= Neolarra =

Genus of bees

Neolarra is a genus of cuckoo bees in the family Apidae. There are about 16 described species in Neolarra, all from North America. These bees are smaller than a grain of rice and are kleptoparasites of Perdita bees.

== Description ==
Smaller than a grain of rice, these bees lay eggs in the nests of Perdita bees; the Neolarra egg hatches and the larva eats the egg and food store (of pollen) intended for a Perdita larva. It enters while the host bee is gone to avoid detection.

It is likely that, in order to hide them from the returning Perdita bee, the eggs are inserted into the walls of brood cells (underground chambers). In order to overpower and kill the young Perdita egg or larva the Neolarra larva develops and uses a hard, sickle-shaped tooth.

== Taxonomy ==
Neolarra was first described in 1890 by Ashmead, as a kind of wasp instead of a bee. This was corrected by Baker in 1896. The genus Phileremulus, created in 1895 when Neolarra was still considered to be a genus of wasp, was revised to be a subgenus of Neolarra by Charles Michener in 1939.

== Species ==
These 16 species belong to the genus Neolarra:

- Neolarra alba Cockerell, 1916^{i c g}
- Neolarra alexanderi Griswold & Parker, 1999^{i c g}
- Neolarra batrae Shanks, 1978^{i c g}
- Neolarra californica Michener, 1939^{i c g b}
- Neolarra clavigera Shanks, 1978^{i c g}
- Neolarra cockerelli (Crawford, 1916)^{i c g}
- Neolarra hurdi Shanks, 1978^{i c g}
- Neolarra linsleyi Michener, 1939^{i c g}
- Neolarra orbiculata Shanks, 1978^{i c g}
- Neolarra penicula Shanks, 1978^{i c g}
- Neolarra pruinosa Ashmead, 1890^{i c g}
- Neolarra rozeni Shanks, 1978^{i c g}
- Neolarra ute Griswold & Parker, 1999^{i c g}
- Neolarra vandykei Michener, 1939^{i c g}
- Neolarra verbesinae (Cockerell, 1895)^{i c g b}
- Neolarra vigilans (Cockerell, 1895)^{i c g b}

Data sources: i = ITIS, c = Catalogue of Life, g = GBIF, b = Bugguide.net
