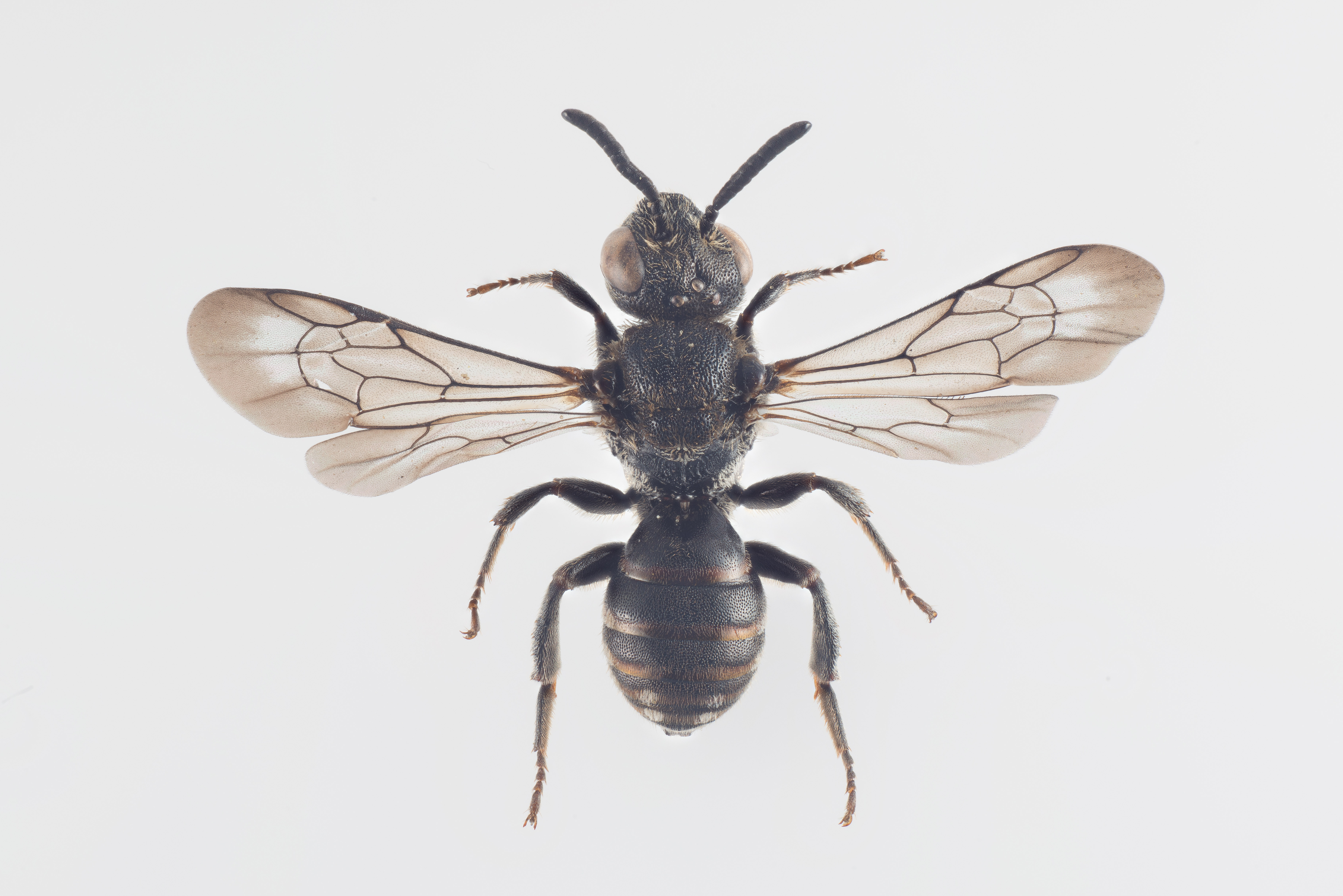
- Biastes truncatus

Scientific classification
- Kingdom: Animalia
- Phylum: Arthropoda
- Class: Insecta
- Order: Hymenoptera
- Family: Apidae
- Subfamily: Nomadinae
- Tribe: Neolarrini

= Neolarrini =

Tribe of bees

Neolarrini is a tribe of cuckoo bees in the family Apidae. There are 5 genera and about 40 described species in Neolarrini, which includes the genera and species formerly included in the deprecated tribes Biastini and Townsendiellini.

== Genera ==
- Biastes Panzer, 1806
- Neolarra Ashmead, 1890
- Rhopalolemma Roig-Alsina, 1991
- Schwarzia Eardley, 2009
- Townsendiella Crawford, 1916
