= List of Melissodes species =

This is a list of species in Melissodes, a genus of long-horned bees in the family Apidae.

== Melissodes species ==
- Melissodes ablusus Cockerell, 1926
- Melissodes agilis Cresson, 1878 (agile long-horned bee)
- Melissodes apicatus Lovell & Cockerell, 1906 (pickerelweed longhorn bee)
- Melissodes appressus LaBerge, 1961
- Melissodes baileyi Cockerell, 1906
- Melissodes bicoloratus LaBerge, 1961
- Melissodes bidentis Cockerell, 1914
- Melissodes bimaculatus Lepeletier, 1825 (two-spotted longhorn)
- Melissodes bimatris LaBerge, 1961
- Melissodes blandus LaBerge, 1956
- Melissodes boltoniae Robertson, 1905
- Melissodes brevipyga LaBerge, 1961
- Melissodes bruneri (Cockerell, 1918)
- Melissodes cerussatus LaBerge, 1961
- Melissodes cestus Krombein, 1953
- Melissodes clarkiae LaBerge, 1961
- Melissodes colliciatus Cockerell, 1910
- Melissodes coloradensis Cresson, 1878
- Melissodes comatus LaBerge, 1961
- Melissodes communis Cresson, 1878 (common long-horned bee)
- Melissodes compositus Tucker, 1909
- Melissodes comptoides Robertson, 1898 (brown-winged long-horned bee)
- Melissodes confusus Cresson, 1878
- Melissodes coreopsis Robertson, 1905
- Melissodes crocinus LaBerge, 1961
- Melissodes cubensis LaBerge, 1956
- Melissodes dagosa Cockerell, 1909
- Melissodes denticulatus Smith, 1854
- Melissodes dentiventris Smith, 1854
- Melissodes desponsus Smith, 1854 (thistle long-horned bee)
- Melissodes druriellus (Kirby, 1802)
- Melissodes ecuadorius Bertoni & Schrottky, 1910
- Melissodes elegans LaBerge, 1961
- Melissodes exilis LaBerge, 1961
- Melissodes expolitus LaBerge, 1961
- Melissodes fasciatellus LaBerge, 1961
- Melissodes fimbriatus Cresson, 1878
- Melissodes flexus LaBerge, 1956
- Melissodes floris Cockerell, 1896
- Melissodes foxi Crawford, 1915
- Melissodes fumosus LaBerge, 1961
- Melissodes gelidus LaBerge, 1961
- Melissodes gilensis Cockerell, 1896
- Melissodes glenwoodensis Cockerell, 1905
- Melissodes grindeliae Cockerell, 1898
- Melissodes haitiensis LaBerge, 1961
- Melissodes humilior Cockerell, 1903
- Melissodes hurdi LaBerge, 1961
- Melissodes hymenoxidis Cockerell, 1906
- Melissodes illatus Lovell & Cockerell, 1906
- Melissodes interruptus LaBerge, 1961
- Melissodes intortus Cresson, 1872
- Melissodes labiatarum Cockerell, 1896
- Melissodes leprieuri Blanchard, 1849
- Melissodes limbus LaBerge, 1961
- Melissodes lupinus Cresson, 1878
- Melissodes lustra LaBerge, 1961
- Melissodes lutulentus LaBerge, 1961
- Melissodes maestus LaBerge, 1956
- Melissodes manipularis Smith, 1854
- Melissodes martinicensis Cockerell, 1917
- Melissodes melanurus (Cockerell, 1916)
- Melissodes menuachus Cresson, 1868
- Melissodes metenua Cockerell, 1924
- Melissodes micheneri LaBerge, 1961
- Melissodes microstictus Cockerell, 1905
- Melissodes mimicus Cresson, 1869
- Melissodes minusculus LaBerge, 1961
- Melissodes mitchelli LaBerge, 1956
- Melissodes monoensis LaBerge, 1961
- Melissodes montanus Cresson, 1878
- Melissodes moorei Cockerell, 1926
- Melissodes morrilli Cockerell, 1918
- Melissodes negligendus Cockerell, 1949
- Melissodes nigracauda LaBerge, 1961
- Melissodes nigroaeneus (Smith, 1854)
- Melissodes niveus Robertson, 1895
- Melissodes ochraea LaBerge, 1961
- Melissodes opuntiellus Cockerell, 1911
- Melissodes pallidisignatus Cockerell, 1905
- Melissodes panamensis Cockerell, 1928
- Melissodes paroselae Cockerell, 1905 (parosela long-horned bee)
- Melissodes paucipuncta LaBerge, 1961
- Melissodes paululus LaBerge, 1961
- Melissodes perlusus Cockerell, 1925
- Melissodes perpolitus LaBerge, 1961
- Melissodes persimilis Cockerell, 1949
- Melissodes personatellus Cockerell, 1901
- Melissodes pexus LaBerge, 1961
- Melissodes pilleatus LaBerge, 1961
- Melissodes plumosus LaBerge, 1961
- Melissodes pullatellus LaBerge, 1961
- Melissodes pullatus Cresson, 1865
- Melissodes raphaelis Cockerell, 1898
- Melissodes relucens LaBerge, 1961
- Melissodes rivalis Cresson, 1872 (rival long-horned bee)
- Melissodes robustior Cockerell, 1915 (robust long-horned bee)
- Melissodes rufipes LaBerge, 1961
- Melissodes rufodentatus Smith, 1854
- Melissodes saponellus Cockerell, 1908
- Melissodes scotti Cockerell, 1939
- Melissodes semilupinus Cockerell, 1905
- Melissodes sexcinctus (Lepeletier, 1841)
- Melissodes snowii Cresson, 1878
- Melissodes sonorensis LaBerge, 1963
- Melissodes sphaeralceae Cockerell, 1896
- Melissodes stearnsi Cockerell, 1905
- Melissodes subagilis Cockerell, 1905
- Melissodes subillatus LaBerge, 1961
- Melissodes submenuachus Cockerell, 1897
- Melissodes tepaneca Cresson, 1878 (tepanec long-horned bee)
- Melissodes tepidus Cresson, 1878
- Melissodes terminatus LaBerge, 1961
- Melissodes tescorum LaBerge, 1963
- Melissodes tessellatus LaBerge, 1956
- Melissodes thelypodii Cockerell, 1905
- Melissodes tibialis (Fabricius, 1804)
- Melissodes tinctus LaBerge, 1961
- Melissodes tintinnans (Holmberg, 1884)
- Melissodes tribas LaBerge, 1961
- Melissodes trifasciatus Cresson, 1878
- Melissodes trinodis Robertson, 1901
- Melissodes tristis Cockerell, 1894
- Melissodes tuckeri Cockerell, 1909
- Melissodes utahensis LaBerge, 1961
- Melissodes velutinus (Cockerell, 1916)
- Melissodes verbesinarum Cockerell, 1905
- Melissodes vernalis LaBerge, 1961
- Melissodes vernoniae Robertson, 1902
- Melissodes wheeleri Cockerell, 1906
