= Bushy seedbox =

Bushy seedbox is a common name for several plants in the genus Ludwigia, and may refer to:

- Ludwigia alternifolia, found in North America
