= Melissodes boltoniae =

Scientific classification
- Kingdom: Animalia
- Phylum: Arthropoda
- Clade: Pancrustacea
- Class: Insecta
- Order: Hymenoptera
- Family: Apidae
- Genus: Melissodes
- Species: M. boltoniae

Binomial name
- Melissodes boltoniae Robertson, 1905

Synonyms
- Melissodes melandri Cockerell, 1906

Species of bee

Melissodes boltoniae is a species of bee. It burrows underground, and is a pollinator for various flowering plants.

== See also ==
- List of Melissodes species
