= Pollination =

Biological process occurring in plants

Diagram illustrating the process of pollination

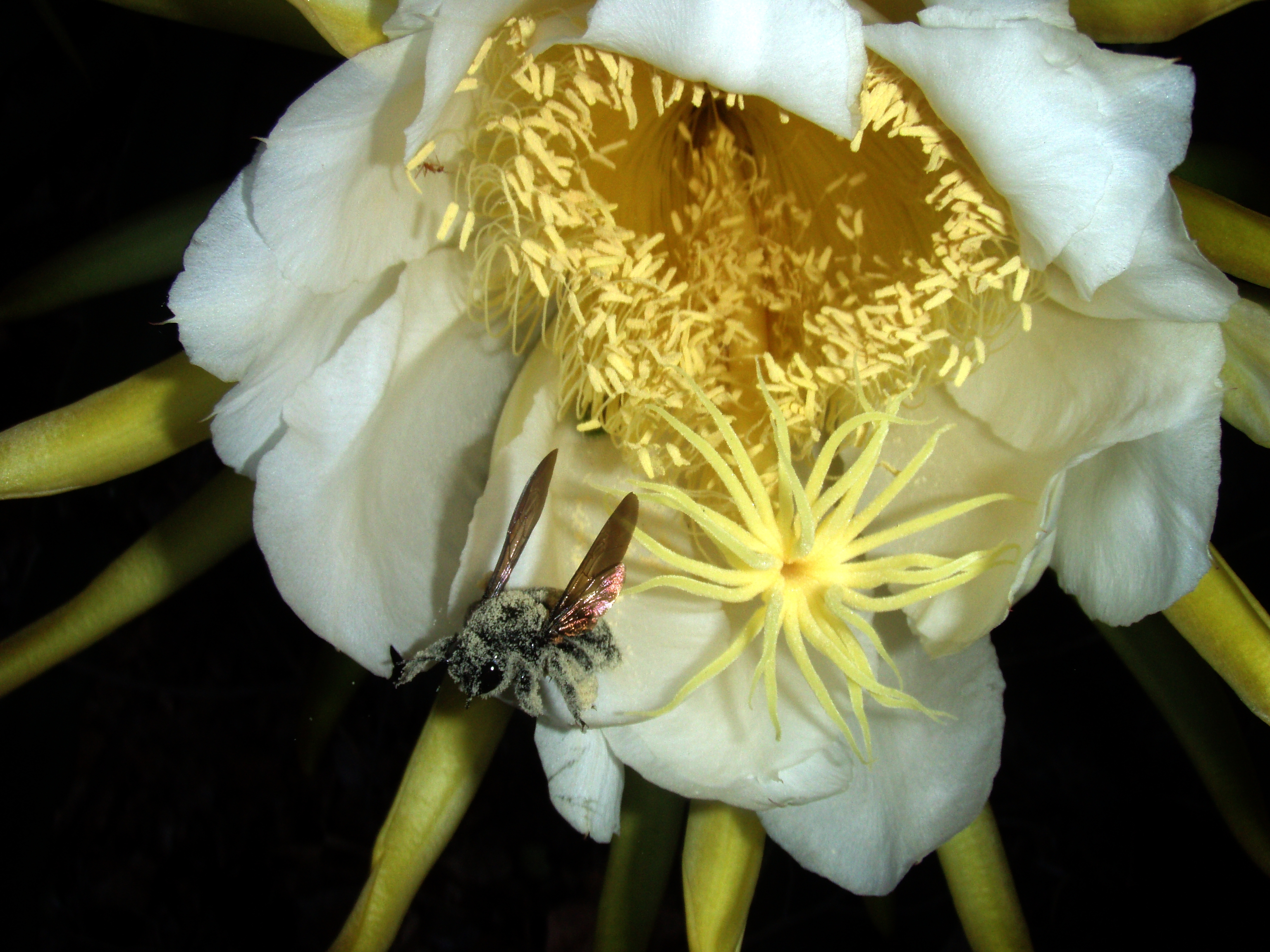
Female carpenter bee with pollen collected from a night-blooming cereus

Pollination is the transfer of pollen from an anther of a plant to the stigma of a plant, later enabling fertilisation and the production of seeds. Pollinating agents can be animals such as insects, for example bees, beetles or butterflies; birds, and bats; water; wind; and even plants themselves. Pollinating animals travel from plant to plant carrying pollen on their bodies in a vital interaction that allows the transfer of genetic material critical to the reproductive system of most flowering plants. Self-pollination can occur within a closed flower, or between flowers on the same plant. Pollination often occurs within a species. When pollination occurs between species, it can produce hybrid offspring in nature and in plant breeding work.

In angiosperms, after the pollen grain (gametophyte) has landed on the stigma, it germinates and develops a pollen tube which grows down the style until it reaches an ovary. Its two gametes travel down the tube to where the gametophyte(s) containing the female gametes are held within the carpel. After entering an ovule through the micropyle, one male nucleus fuses with the polar bodies to produce the endosperm tissues, while the other fuses with the egg cell to produce the embryo. Hence the term: "double fertilisation". This process would result in the production of a seed, made of both nutritious tissues and embryo.

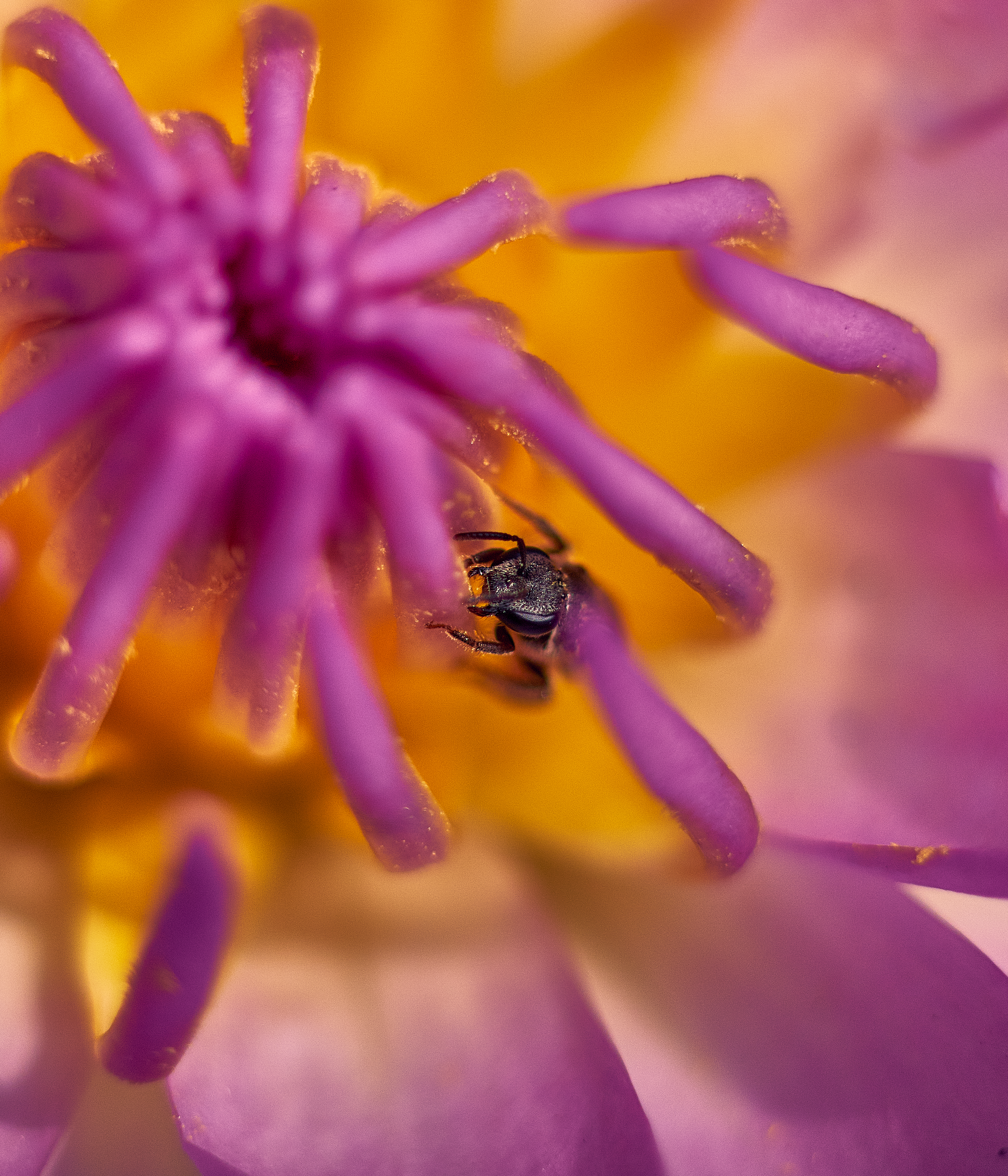

In gymnosperms, the emil is not contained in a carpel, but exposed on the surface of a dedicated support organ, such as the scale of a cone, so that the penetration of carpel tissue is unnecessary. Details of the process vary according to the division of gymnosperms in question. Two main modes of fertilisation are found in gymnosperms: cycads and Ginkgo have motile sperm that swim directly to the egg inside the ovule, whereas conifers and gnetophytes have sperm that are unable to swim but are conveyed to the egg along a pollen tube.

Pollination research covers various fields, including botany, horticulture, entomology, and ecology. The pollination process as an interaction between flower and pollen vector was first addressed in the 18th century by Christian Konrad Sprengel. It is important in horticulture and agriculture, because fruiting is dependent on fertilisation: the result of pollination. The study of pollination by insects is known as anthecology. There are also studies in economics that look at the positives and negatives of pollination, focused on bees, and how the process affects the pollinators themselves.

== Process of pollination ==
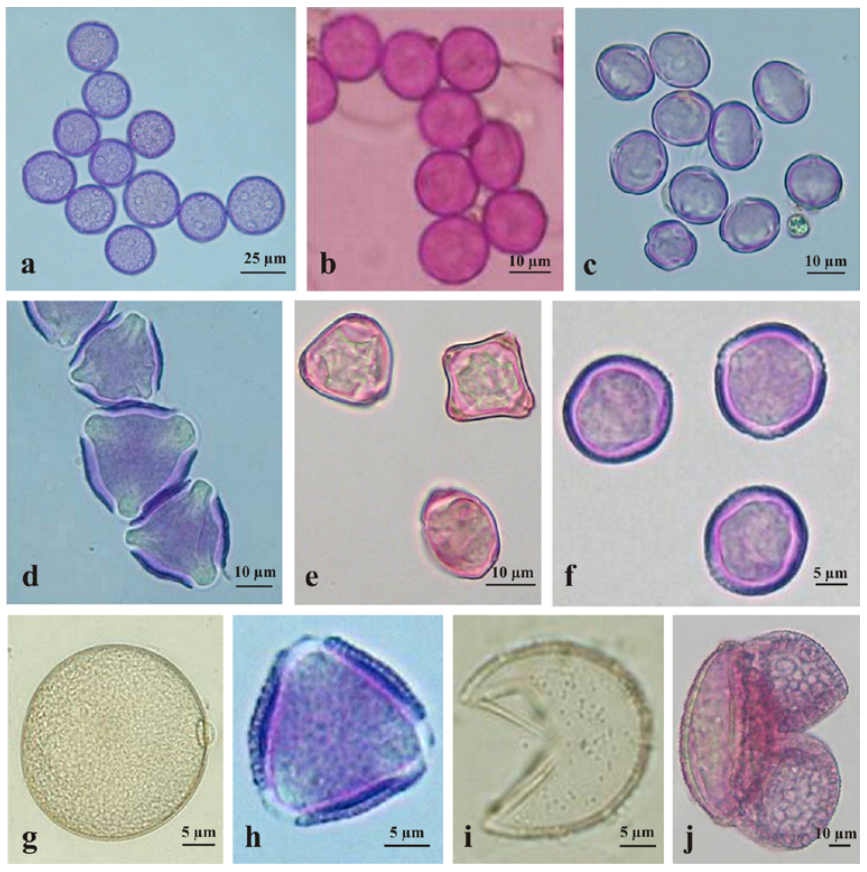
Pollen grains observed in aeroplankton of South Europe

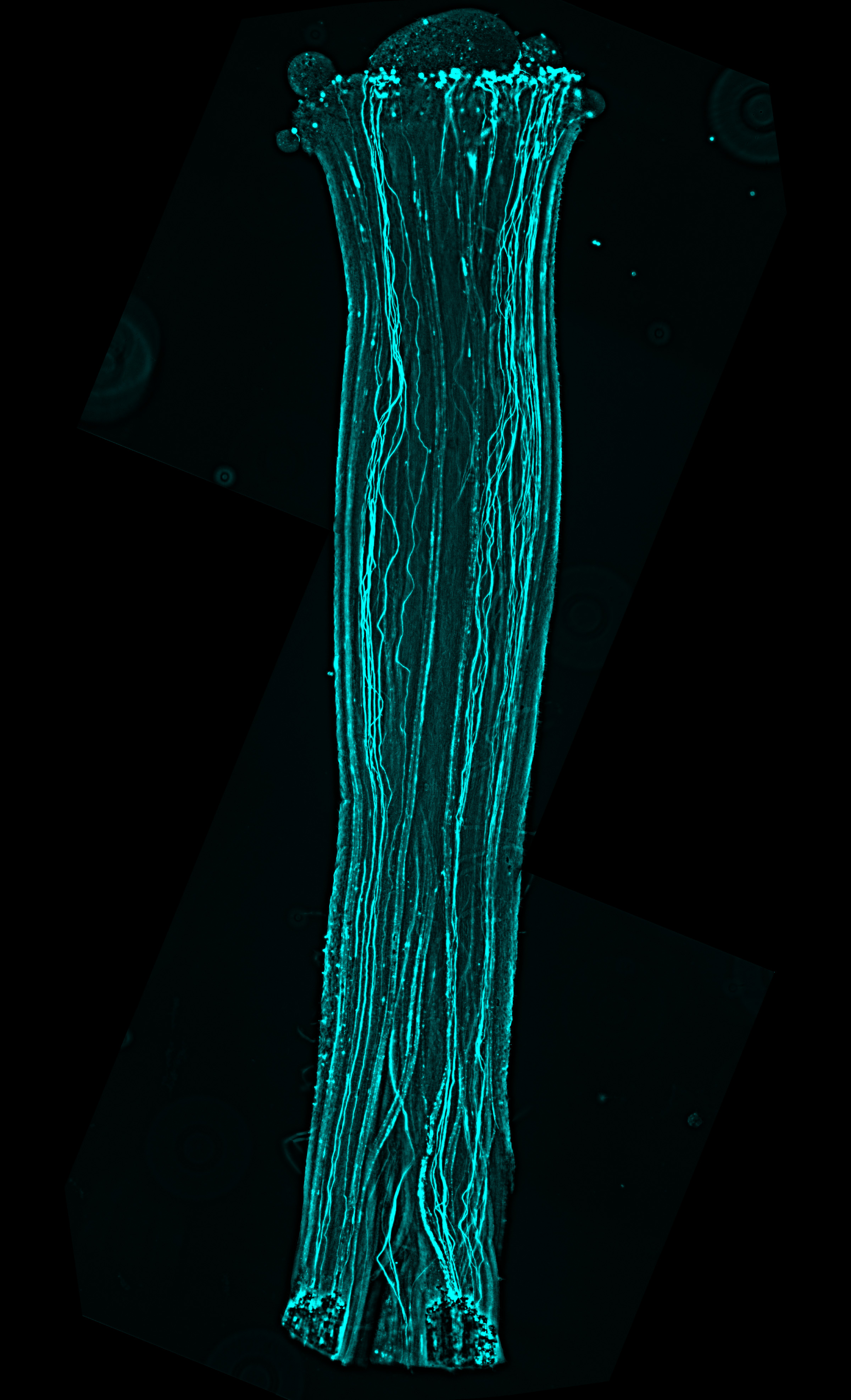
Decolorized aniline blue fluorescence image showing growing pollen tubes in a tomato pistil

Pollen germination has three stages; hydration, activation and pollen tube emergence. The pollen grain is severely dehydrated so that its mass is reduced, enabling it to be more easily transported from flower to flower. Germination only takes place after rehydration, ensuring that premature germination does not take place in the anther. Hydration allows the plasma membrane of the pollen grain to reform into its normal bilayer organization providing an effective osmotic membrane. Activation involves the development of actin filaments throughout the cytoplasm of the cell, which eventually become concentrated at the point from which the pollen tube will emerge. Hydration and activation continue as the pollen tube begins to grow. In conifers, the reproductive structures are borne on cones. The cones are either pollen cones (male) or ovulate cones (female), but some species are monoecious and others dioecious. A pollen cone contains hundreds of microsporangia carried on (or borne on) reproductive structures called sporophylls. Spore mother cells in the microsporangia divide by meiosis to form haploid microspores that develop further by two mitotic divisions into immature male gametophytes (pollen grains). The four resulting cells consist of a large tube cell that forms the pollen tube, a generative cell that will produce two sperm by mitosis, and two prothallial cells that degenerate. These cells comprise a very reduced microgametophyte, that is contained within the resistant.

The pollen grains are dispersed by the wind to the female, ovulate cone that is made up of many overlapping scales (sporophylls, and thus megasporophylls), each protecting two ovules, each of which consists of a megasporangium (the nucellus) wrapped in two layers of tissue, the integument and the cupule, that were derived from highly modified branches of ancestral gymnosperms. When a pollen grain lands close enough to the tip of an ovule, it is drawn in through the micropyle ( a pore in the integuments covering the tip of the ovule) often by means of a drop of liquid known as a pollination drop. The pollen enters a pollen chamber close to the nucellus, and there it may wait for a year before it germinates and forms a pollen tube that grows through the wall of the megasporangium (=nucellus) where fertilisation takes place. During this time, the megaspore mother cell divides by meiosis to form four haploid cells, three of which degenerate. The surviving one develops as a megaspore and divides repeatedly to form an immature female gametophyte (egg sac). Two or three archegonia containing an egg then develop inside the gametophyte. Meanwhile, in the spring of the second year two sperm cells are produced by mitosis of the body cell of the male gametophyte. The pollen tube elongates and pierces and grows through the megasporangium wall and delivers the sperm cells to the female gametophyte inside. Fertilisation takes place when the nucleus of one of the sperm cells enters the egg cell in the megagametophyte's archegonium.

In flowering plants, the anthers of the flower produce microspores by meiosis. These undergo mitosis to form male gametophytes, each of which contains two haploid cells. Meanwhile, the ovules produce megaspores by meiosis, further division of these form the female gametophytes, which are very strongly reduced, each consisting only of a few cells, one of which is the egg. When a pollen grain adheres to the stigma of a carpel it germinates, developing a pollen tube that grows through the tissues of the style, entering the ovule through the micropyle. When the tube reaches the egg sac, two sperm cells pass through it into the female gametophyte and fertilisation takes place.

== Methods ==
Pollination may be biotic or abiotic. Biotic pollination relies on living pollinators to move the pollen from one flower to another. Abiotic pollination relies on wind, water or even rain. Adding natural habitat areas into farm systems generally improves pollination, as farms that are closer to natural habitat have higher crop yield because they are visited by more pollinators. Non-native plants can be equally as effective as native plants at attracting bees as pollinators, however they do tend to attract different types of bees, namely more generalist species.

=== Biotic pollination ===
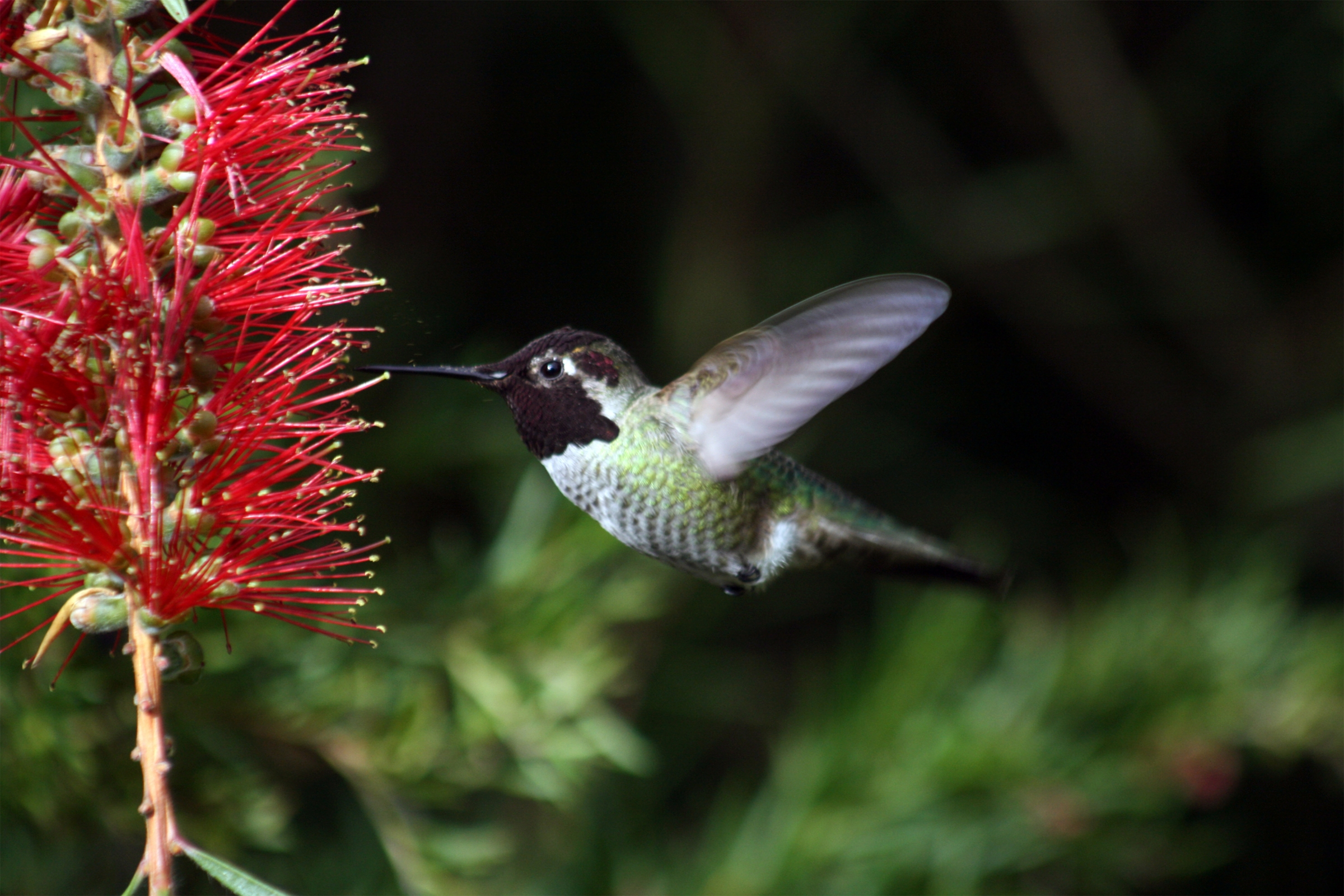
Hummingbirds typically feed on red flowers

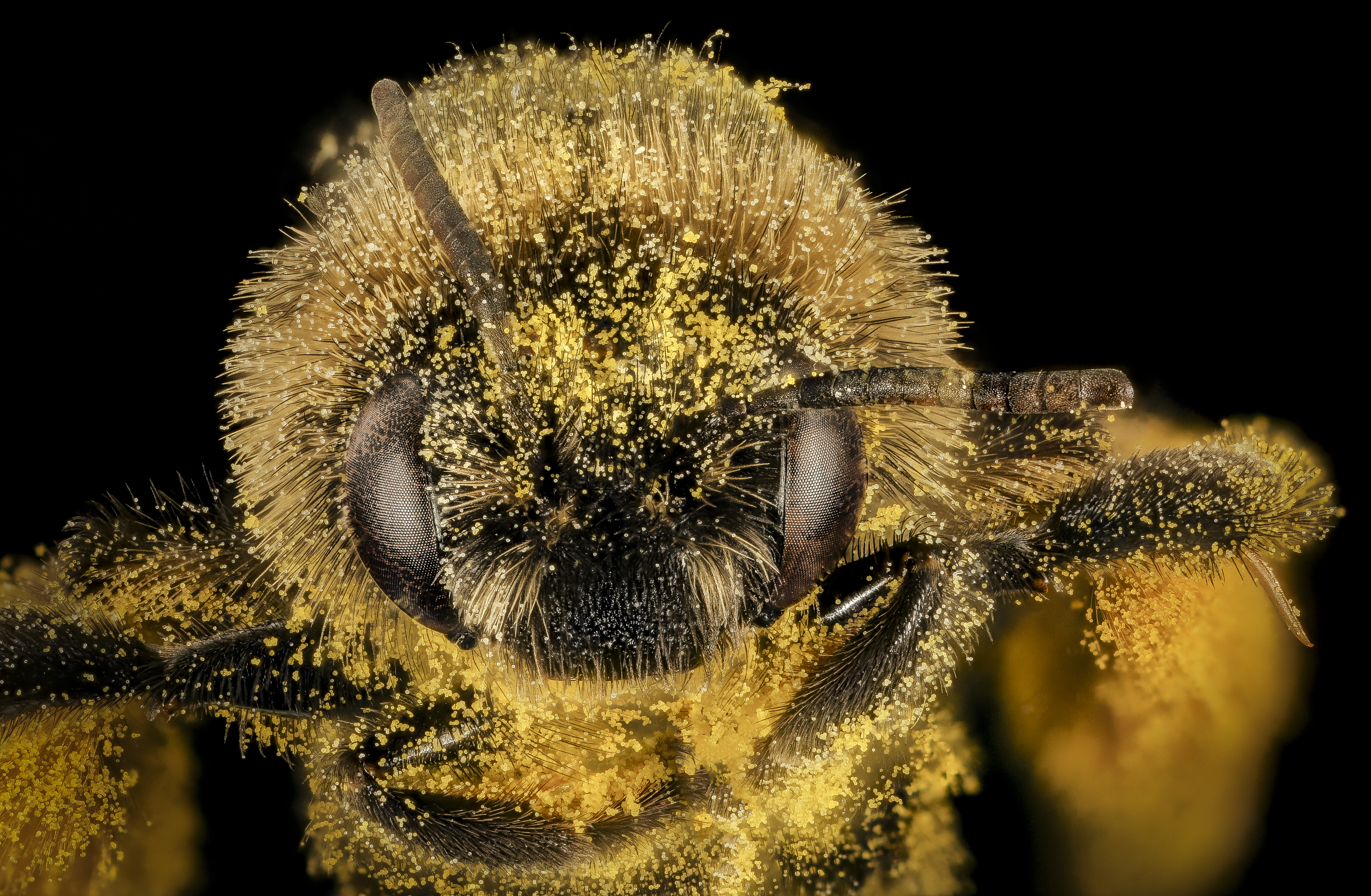
A bee (Melissodes desponsus) covered in pollen

About 80% of angiosperms rely on biotic pollination. (also called pollen vectors): organisms that carry or move the pollen grains from the anther of one flower to the receptive part of the carpel or pistil (stigma) of another. Between 100,000 and 200,000 species of animal act as pollinators of the world's 250,000 species of flowering plant. The majority of these pollinators are insects, but about 1,500 species of birds and mammals visit flowers and may transfer pollen between them. Besides birds and bats which are the most frequent visitors, these include monkeys, lemurs, squirrels, rodents and possums.

Entomophily, pollination by insects, often occurs on plants that have developed colored petals and a strong scent to attract insects such as bees, wasps, and occasionally ants (Hymenoptera), beetles (Coleoptera), moths and butterflies (Lepidoptera), and flies (Diptera). The existence of insect pollination dates back to the dinosaur era.

Insect pollinators such as honey bees (Apis spp.), bumblebees (Bombus spp.), and butterflies (e.g., Thymelicus flavus) have been observed to engage in flower constancy, which means they are more likely to transfer pollen to other conspecific plants. This can be beneficial for the pollinators, as flower constancy prevents the loss of pollen during interspecific flights and pollinators from clogging stigmas with pollen of other flower species. It also improves the probability that the pollinator will find productive flowers easily accessible and recognisable by familiar clues. The primary insect pollinators are hymenopterans, mostly bees, but also including sawflies, ants, and many species of wasps.

Many flowers attract pollinators by odor. For example, orchid bee species such as Euglossa cordata are attracted to orchids this way, and it has been suggested that some orchid species intoxicate bees during visits which can last up to 90 minutes. However, in general, plants that rely on pollen vectors tend to be adapted to their particular type of vector, for example day-pollinated species tend to be brightly coloured and have little odor, but if they are pollinated largely by birds or specialist mammals, they tend to be larger and have larger nectar rewards than species that are strictly insect-pollinated. Night-blooming flowers have little color, but are often very aromatic. Plants with vertebrate pollinators also tend to spread their rewards over longer periods, having long flowering seasons; their specialist pollinators would be likely to starve if the pollination season were too short.

Some flowers have specialized mechanisms to trap pollinators to increase effectiveness, attach pollen to specific body parts (as happens in many orchid and Asclepias species), or require specialized behaviors or morphology in order to extract pollen or nectar. One such syndrome is "buzz pollination" (or "sonication"), where a bee must vibrate at a certain frequency in order to cause pollen to be released from the anthers.

In zoophily, pollination is performed by vertebrates such as birds and bats, particularly, hummingbirds, sunbirds, spiderhunters, honeyeaters, and fruit bats. Ornithophily or bird pollination is the pollination of flowering plants by birds. Chiropterophily or bat pollination is the pollination of flowering plants by bats. Plants adapted to use bats or moths as pollinators typically have white petals, strong scent and flower at night, whereas plants that use birds as pollinators tend to produce copious nectar and have red petals.

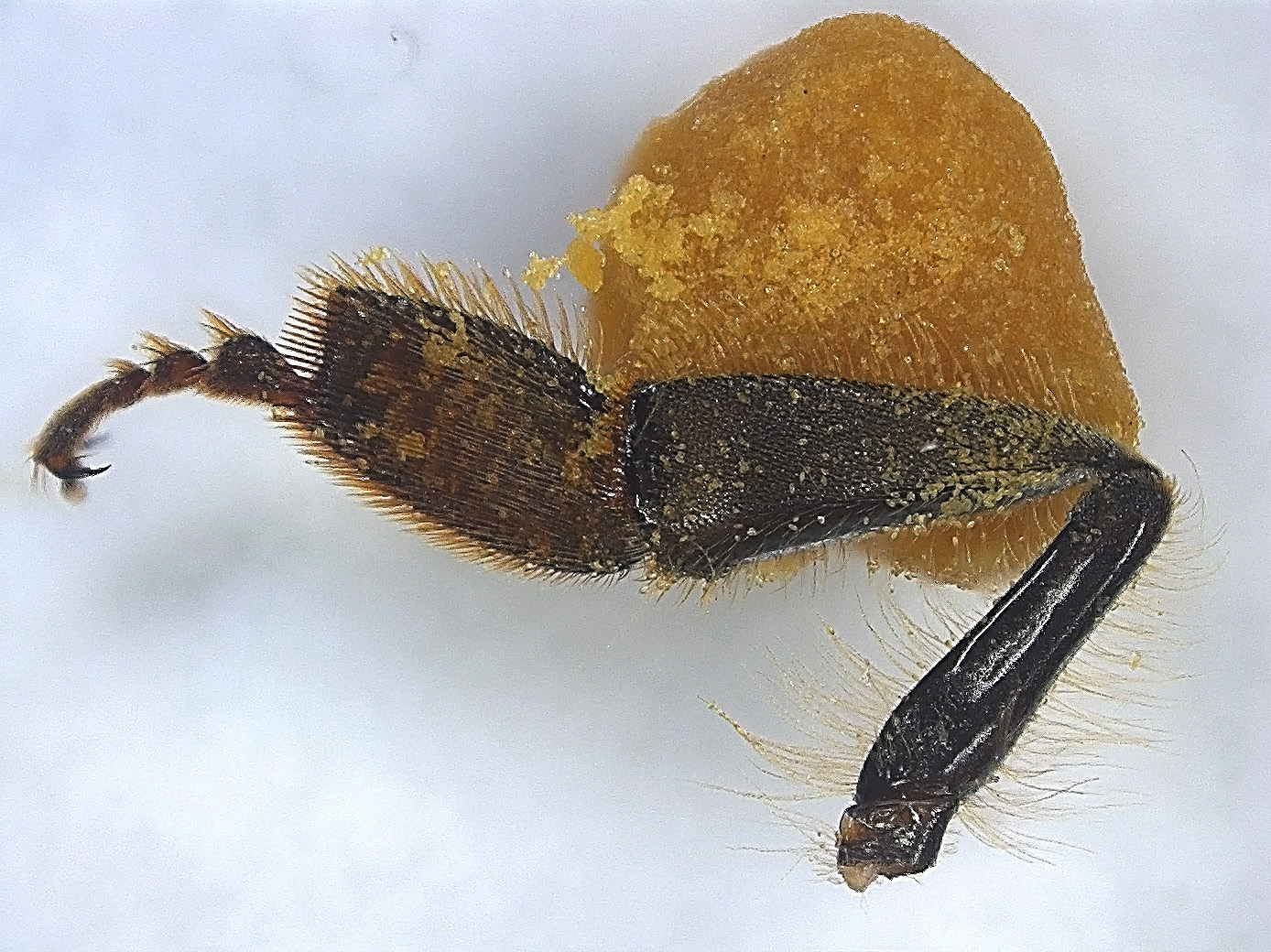
Hind leg of a honey bee with pollen pellet stuck on the pollen basket or corbicula. When the worker bee is collecting pollen, their legs make the transfer of pollen from the inner basitarsal combs to the outer pollen basket (shown in figure).

Mammals are not generally thought of as pollinators, but some rodents, bats and marsupials are significant pollinators and some even specialise in such activities. In South Africa certain species of Protea (in particular Protea humiflora, P. amplexicaulis, P. subulifolia, P. decurrens and P. cordata) are adapted to pollination by rodents (particularly Cape Spiny Mouse, Acomys subspinosus) and elephant shrews (Elephantulus species). The flowers are borne near the ground, are yeasty smelling, not colourful, and sunbirds reject the nectar with its high xylose content. The mice apparently can digest the xylose and they eat large quantities of the pollen. In Australia pollination by flying, gliding and earthbound mammals has been demonstrated. One species of canid, the Ethiopian wolf, has also been seen to pollinate with its muzzle Kniphofia foliosa.

Reptile pollinators are known, but they form a minority in most ecological situations. They are most frequent and most ecologically significant in island systems, where insect and sometimes also bird populations may be unstable and less species-rich. Adaptation to a lack of animal food and of predation pressure, might therefore favour reptiles becoming more herbivorous and more inclined to feed on pollen and nectar. Most species of lizards in the families that seem to be significant in pollination seem to carry pollen only incidentally, especially the larger species such as Varanidae and Iguanidae, but especially several species of the Gekkonidae are active pollinators, and so is at least one species of the Lacertidae, Podarcis lilfordi, which pollinates various species, but in particular is the major pollinator of Euphorbia dendroides on various Mediterranean islands.

Experimental evidence has shown invertebrates (mostly small crustaceans) acting as pollinators in underwater environments. Beds of seagrass have been shown to reproduce this way in the absence of currents. It is not yet known how important invertebrate pollinators might be for other species. Later, Idotea balthica was discovered to help Gracilaria gracilis reproduce – the first known case of an animal helping algae reproduce.

=== Abiotic pollination ===
Abiotic pollination uses nonliving methods such as wind and water to move pollen from one flower to another. This allows the plant to spend energy directly on pollen rather than on attracting pollinators with flowers and nectar. Pollination by wind is more common amongst abiotic pollination.

==== By wind ====
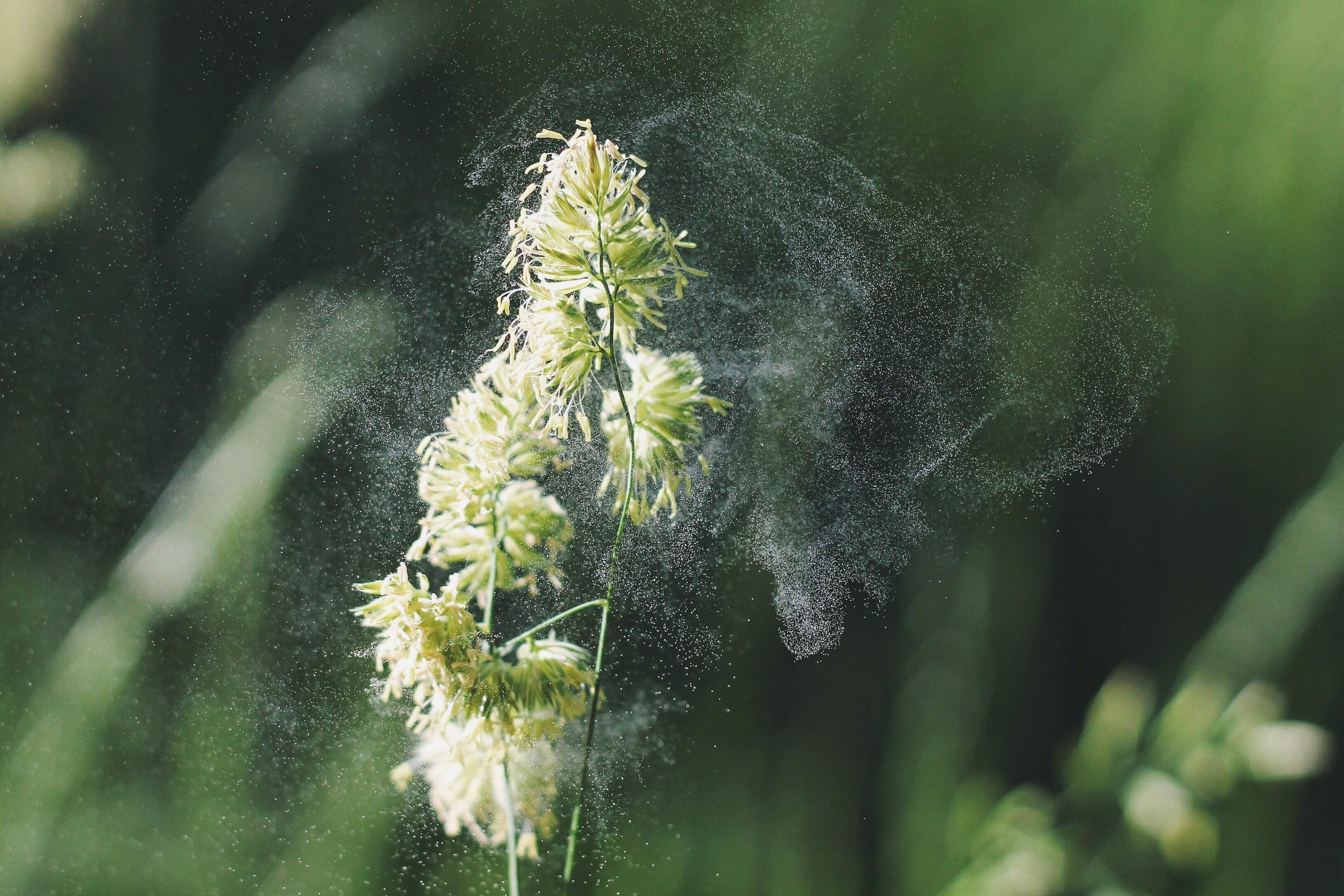
Cat grass (Dactylis glomerata) spreading pollen by wind

Some 98% of abiotic pollination is anemophily, i.e., pollination by wind. This probably arose from insect pollination (entomophily), most likely due to changes in the environment or the availability of pollinators. The transfer of pollen is more efficient than previously thought; wind pollinated plants have developed to have specific heights, in addition to specific floral, stamen and stigma positions that promote effective pollen dispersal and transfer.

==== By water ====
Pollination by water, hydrophily, uses water to transport pollen, sometimes as whole anthers; these can travel across the surface of the water to carry dry pollen from one flower to another. In Vallisneria spiralis, an unopened male flower floats to the surface of the water, and, upon reaching the surface, opens up and the fertile anthers project forward. The female flower, also floating, has its stigma protected from the water, while its sepals are slightly depressed into the water, allowing the male flowers to tumble in.

==== By rain ====
Rain pollination is used by a small percentage of plants. Heavy rain discourages insect pollination and damages unprotected flowers, but can itself disperse pollen of suitably adapted plants, such as Ranunculus flammula, Narthecium ossifragum, and Caltha palustris. In these plants, excess rain drains allowing the floating pollen to come in contact with the stigma. In some orchids ombrophily occurs, and rain water splashes cause the anther cap to be removed, allowing for the pollen to be exposed. After exposure, raindrops causes the pollen to be shot upward, when the stipe pulls them back, and then fall into the cavity of the stigma. Thus, for the orchid Acampe rigida, this allows the plant to self-pollinate, which is useful when biotic pollinators in the environment have decreased.

==== Switching methods ====
It is possible for a plant to have varying pollination methods, including both biotic and abiotic pollination. The orchid Oeceoclades maculata uses both rain and butterflies, depending on its environmental conditions.

== Mechanism ==
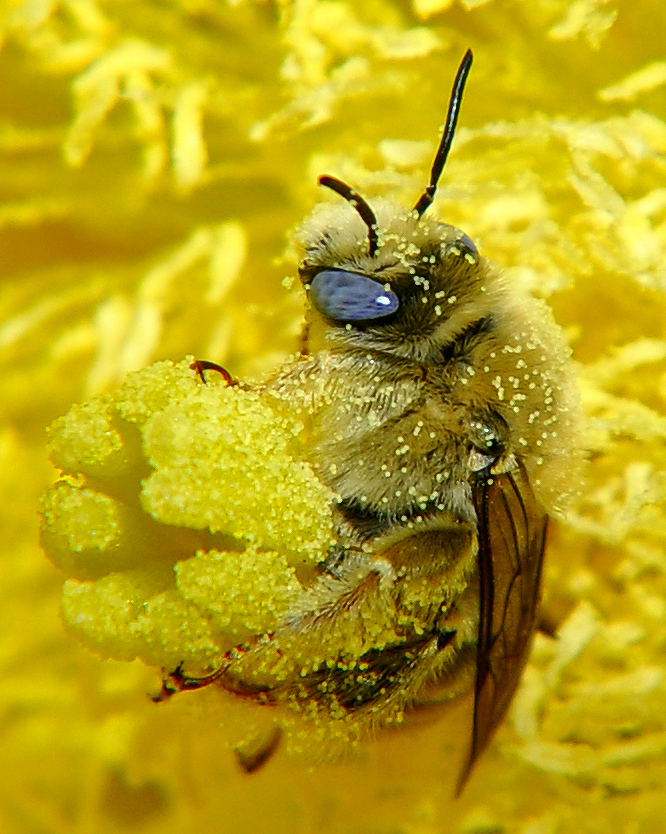
Diadasia bee straddles cactus carpels

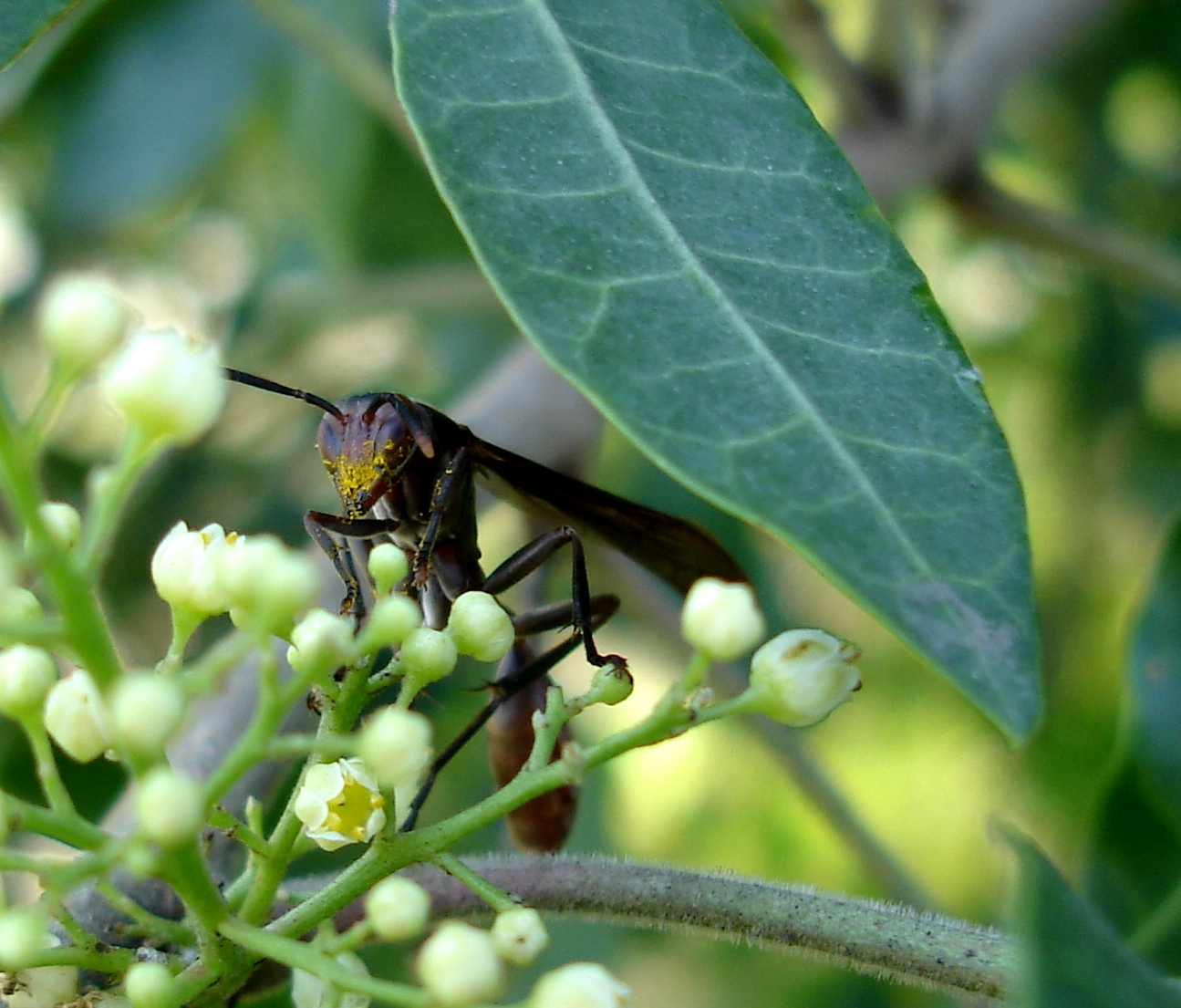
The wasp Mischocyttarus rotundicollis transporting pollen grains of Schinus terebinthifolius

Pollination: Time-lapse (200×) of a Zinnia disc floret with stigmas maturing after pollen release. Visiting insects: hoverflies, an immature insect, and skipper butterflies shown at normal speed. Closeup of style and stigmas shown during visits.

Pollination can be accomplished by cross-pollination or by self-pollination:

- Cross-pollination, also called allogamy, occurs when pollen is delivered from the stamen of one flower to the stigma of a flower on another plant of the same species. Plants adapted for cross-pollination have several mechanisms to prevent self-pollination; the reproductive organs may be arranged in such a way that self-fertilisation is unlikely, or the stamens and carpels may mature at different times.
- Self-pollination occurs when pollen from one flower pollinates the same flower or other flowers of the same individual. It is thought to have evolved under conditions when pollinators were not reliable vectors for pollen transport, and is most often seen in short-lived annual species and plants that colonize new locations. Self-pollination may include autogamy, where pollen is transferred from anther (male part) to the stigma (female part) of the same flower; or geitonogamy, when pollen is transferred from anther of a flower to stigma of another flower on the same plant. Plants adapted to self-fertilize often have similar stamen and carpel lengths. Plants that can pollinate themselves and produce viable offspring are called self-fertile. Plants that cannot fertilize themselves are called self-sterile, a condition which mandates cross-pollination for the production of offspring.
- Cleistogamy: is self-pollination that occurs before the flower opens. The pollen is released from the anther within the flower or the pollen on the anther grows a tube down the style to the ovules. It is a type of sexual breeding, in contrast to asexual systems such as apomixis. Some cleistogamous flowers never open, in contrast to chasmogamous flowers that open and are then pollinated. Cleistogamous flowers are by necessity found on self-compatible or self-fertile plants. Although certain orchids and grasses are entirely cleistogamous, other plants resort to this strategy under adverse conditions. Often there may be a mixture of both cleistogamous and chasmogamous flowers, sometimes on different parts of the plant and sometimes in mixed inflorescences. The ground bean produces cleistogamous flowers below ground, and mixed cleistogamous and chasmogamous flowers above.
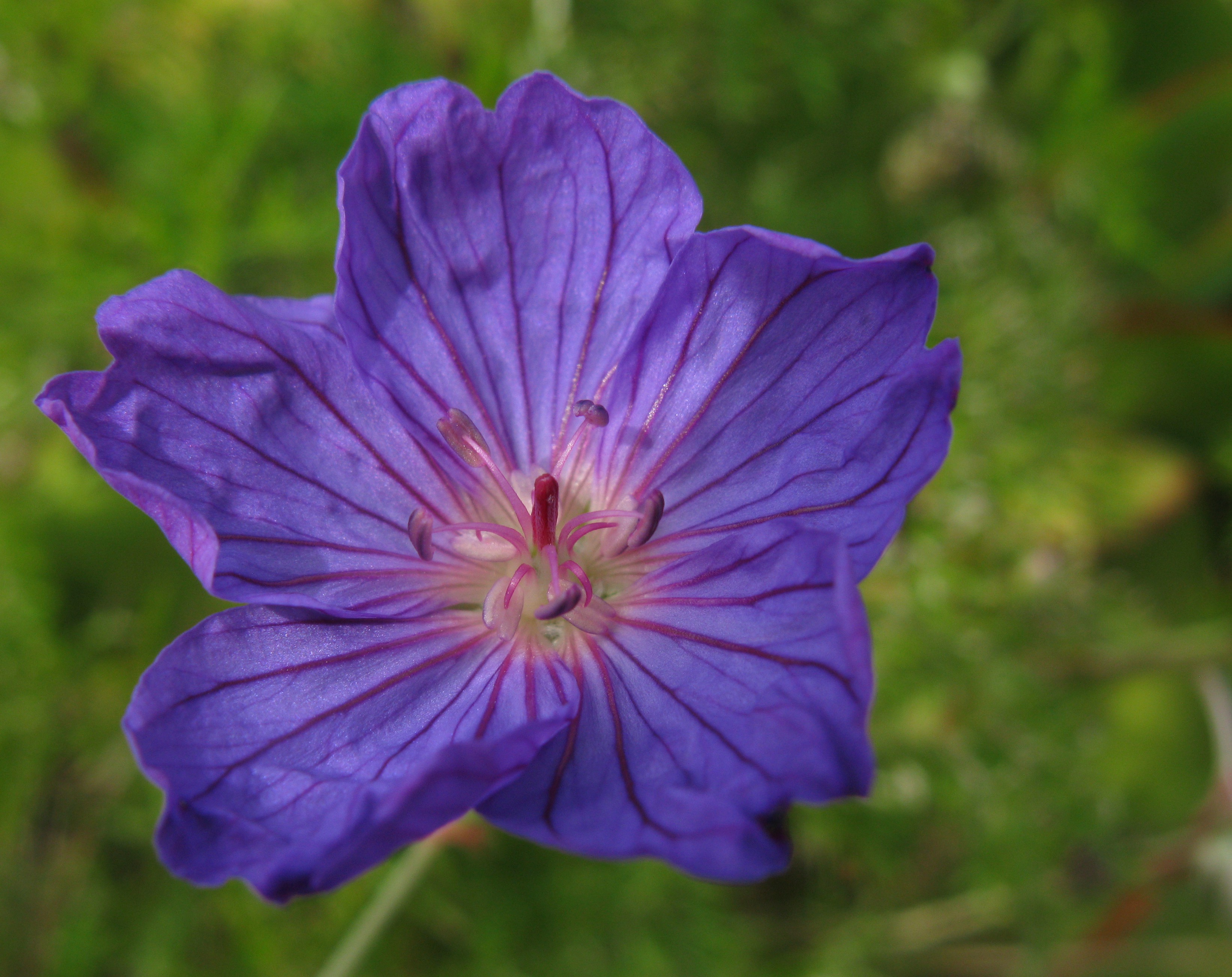
Geranium incanum, like most geraniums and pelargoniums, sheds its anthers, sometimes its stamens as well, as a barrier to self-pollination. This young flower is about to open its anthers, but has not yet fully developed its pistil.

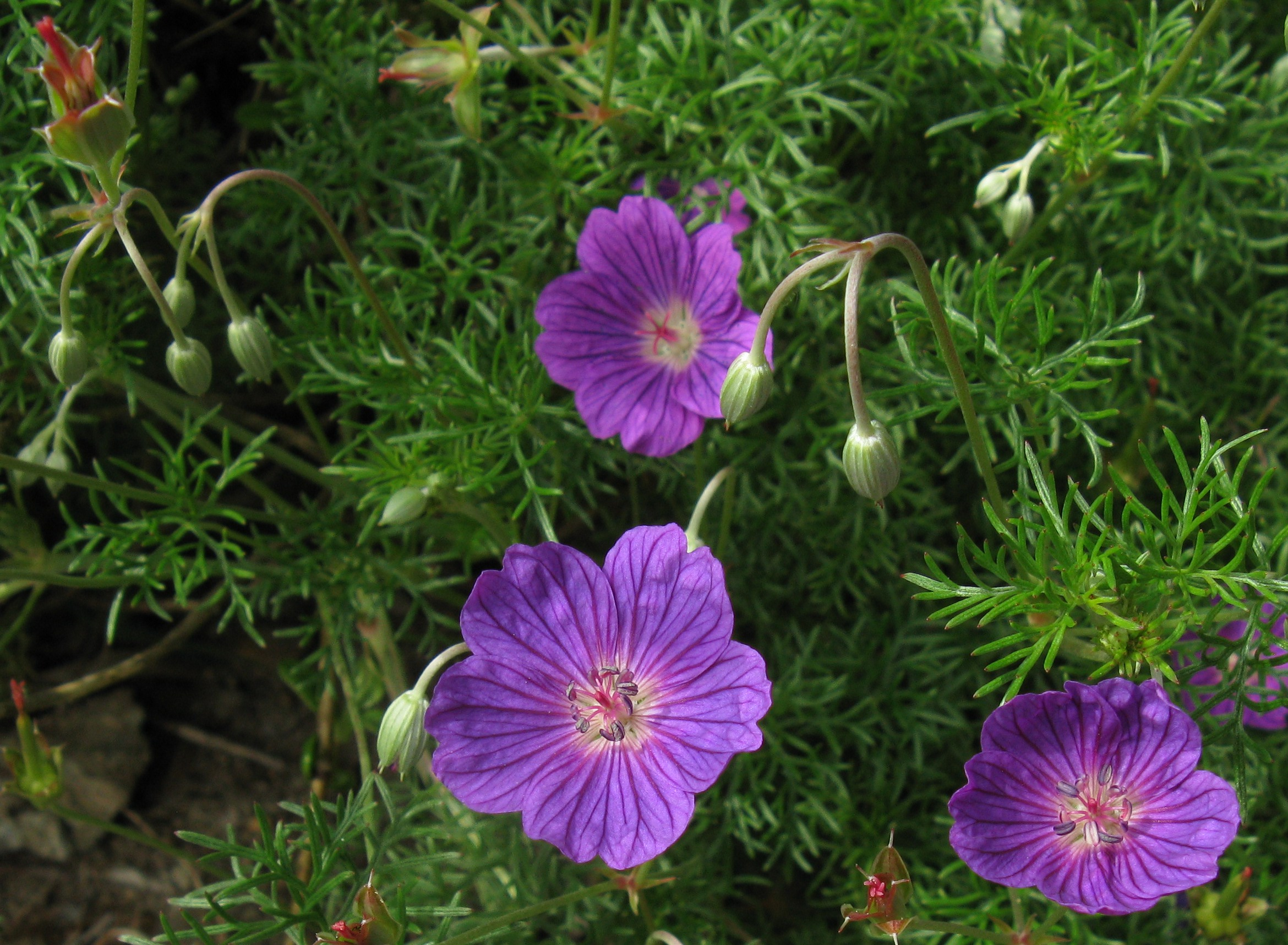
The lower two of these Geranium incanum flowers have opened their anthers, but not yet their stigmas. Note the change of colour that signals to pollinators that they are ready for visits. The uppermost flower is somewhat more mature than the others and has already shed its stamens.

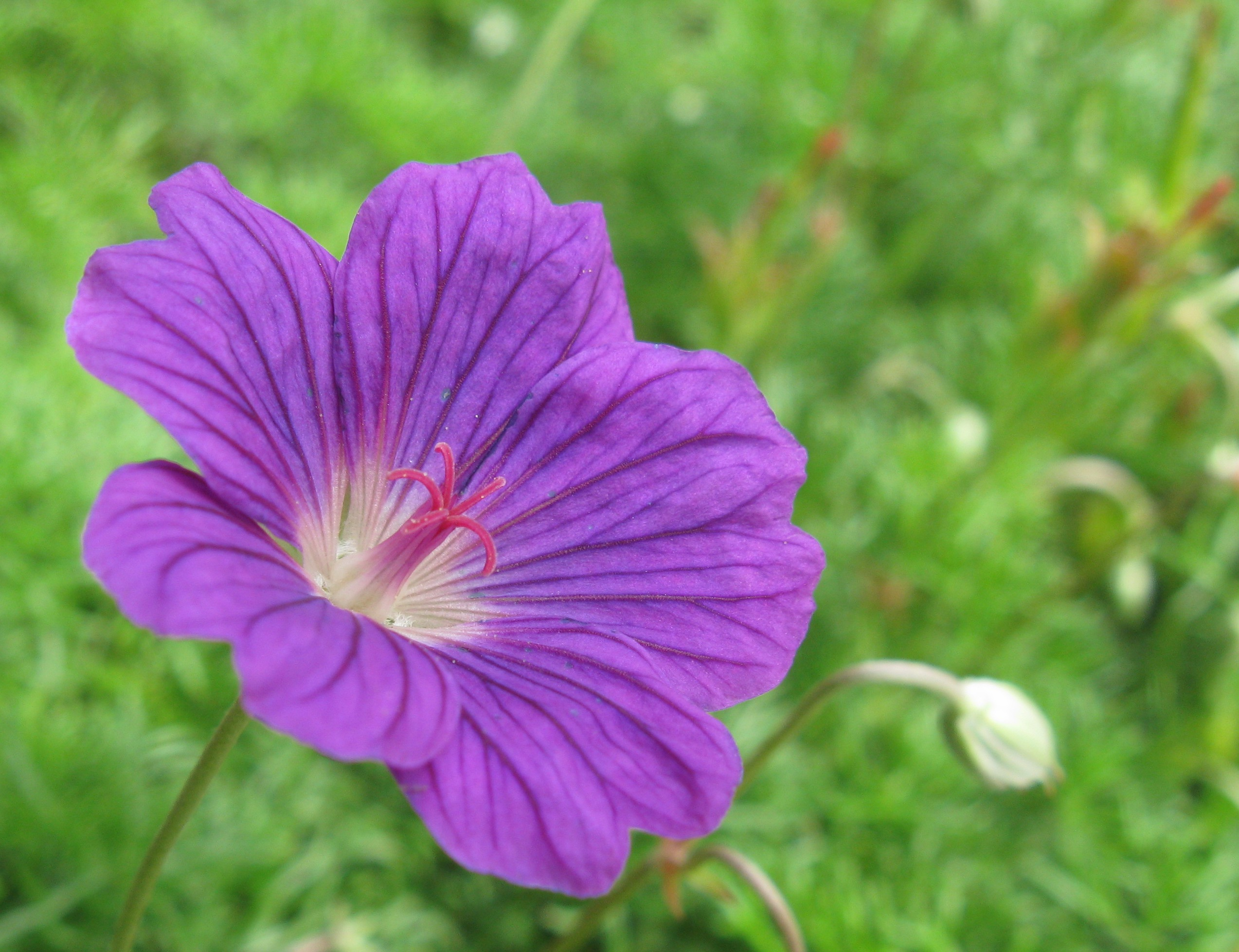
This Geranium incanum flower has shed its stamens, and deployed the tips of its pistil without accepting pollen from its own anthers. (It might of course still receive pollen from younger flowers on the same plant.)

An estimated 48.7% of plant species are either dioecious or self-incompatible obligate out-crossers. It is also estimated that about 42% of flowering plants have a mixed mating system in nature. In the most common kind of mixed mating system, individual plants produce a single type of flower and fruits may contain self-pollinated, out-crossed or a mixture of progeny types.

Pollination also requires consideration of pollenizers, the plants that serve as the pollen source for other plants. Some plants are self-compatible (self-fertile) and can pollinate and fertilize themselves. Other plants have chemical or physical barriers to self-pollination.

In agriculture and horticulture pollination management, a good pollenizer is a plant that provides compatible, viable and plentiful pollen and blooms at the same time as the plant that is to be pollinated or has pollen that can be stored and used when needed to pollinate the desired flowers. Hybridization is effective pollination between flowers of different species, or between different breeding lines or populations. see also Heterosis.

Peaches are considered self-fertile because a commercial crop can be produced without cross-pollination, though cross-pollination usually gives a better crop. Apples are considered self-incompatible, because a commercial crop must be cross-pollinated. Many commercial fruit tree varieties are grafted clones, genetically identical. An orchard block of apples of one variety is genetically a single plant. Many growers now consider this a mistake. One means of correcting this mistake is to graft a limb of an appropriate pollenizer (generally a variety of crabapple) every six trees or so.

== Coevolution ==
The first fossil record for abiotic pollination is from fern-like plants in the late Carboniferous period. Gymnosperms show evidence for biotic pollination as early as the Triassic period. Many fossilized pollen grains show characteristics similar to the biotically dispersed pollen today. Furthermore, the gut contents, wing structures, and mouthpart morphology of fossilized beetles and flies suggest that they acted as early pollinators. The association between beetles and angiosperms during the early Cretaceous period led to parallel radiations of angiosperms and insects into the late Cretaceous. The evolution of nectaries in late Cretaceous flowers signals the beginning of the mutualism between hymenopterans and angiosperms.

Bees provide a good example of the mutualism that exists between hymenopterans and angiosperms. Flowers provide bees with nectar (an energy source) and pollen (a source of protein). When bees go from flower to flower collecting pollen they are also depositing pollen grains onto the flowers, thus pollinating them. While pollen and nectar, in most cases, are the most notable reward attained from flowers, bees also visit flowers for other resources such as oil, fragrance, resin and even waxes. It has been estimated that bees originated with the origin or diversification of angiosperms. In addition, cases of coevolution between bee species and flowering plants have been illustrated by specialized adaptations. For example, long legs are selected for in Rediviva neliana, a bee that collects oil from Diascia capsularis, which have long spur lengths that are selected for in order to deposit pollen on the oil-collecting bee, which in turn selects for even longer legs in R. neliana and again longer spur length in D. capsularis is selected for, thus, continually driving each other's evolution.

== In agriculture ==
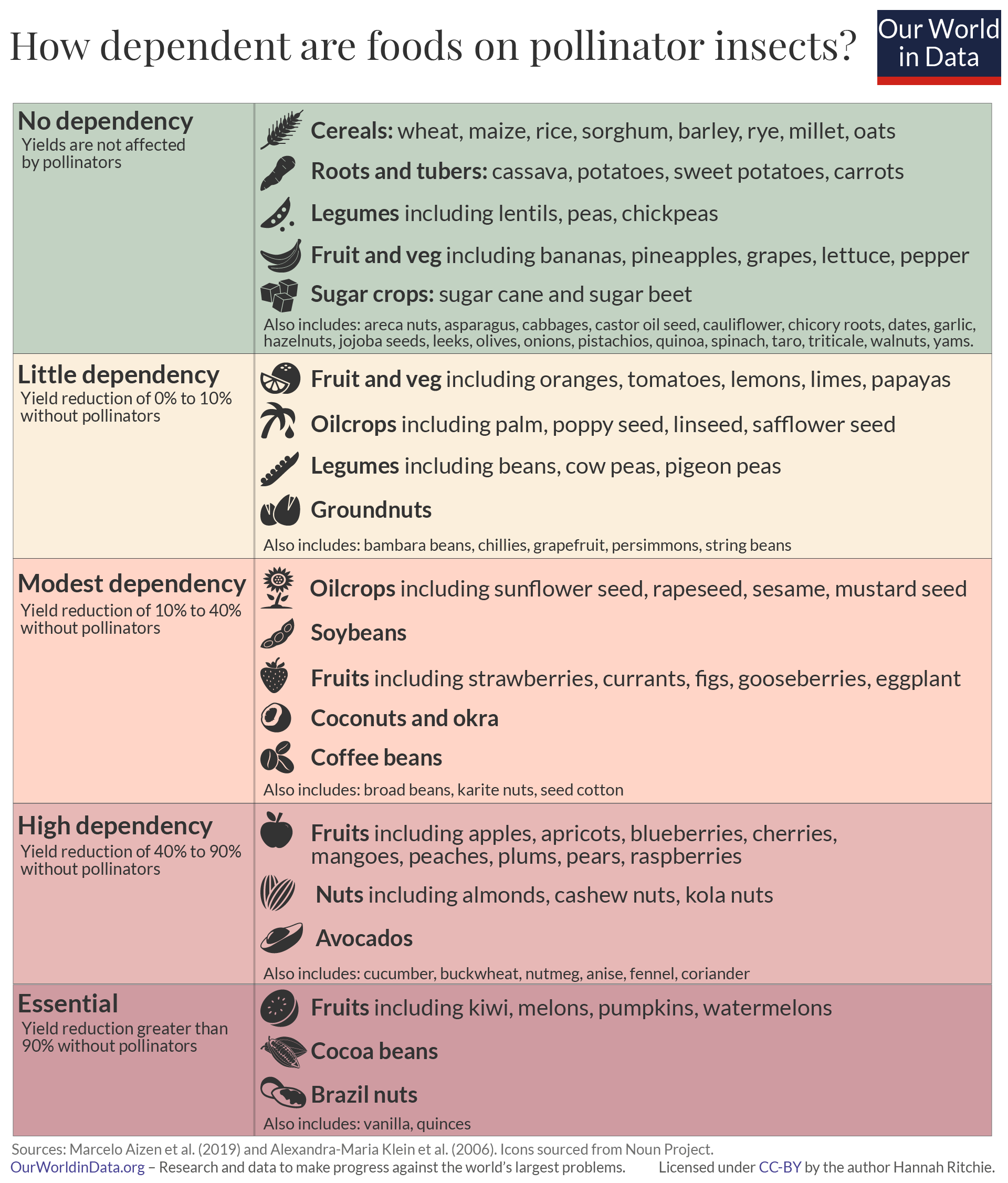
What crops are dependent on pollinators?

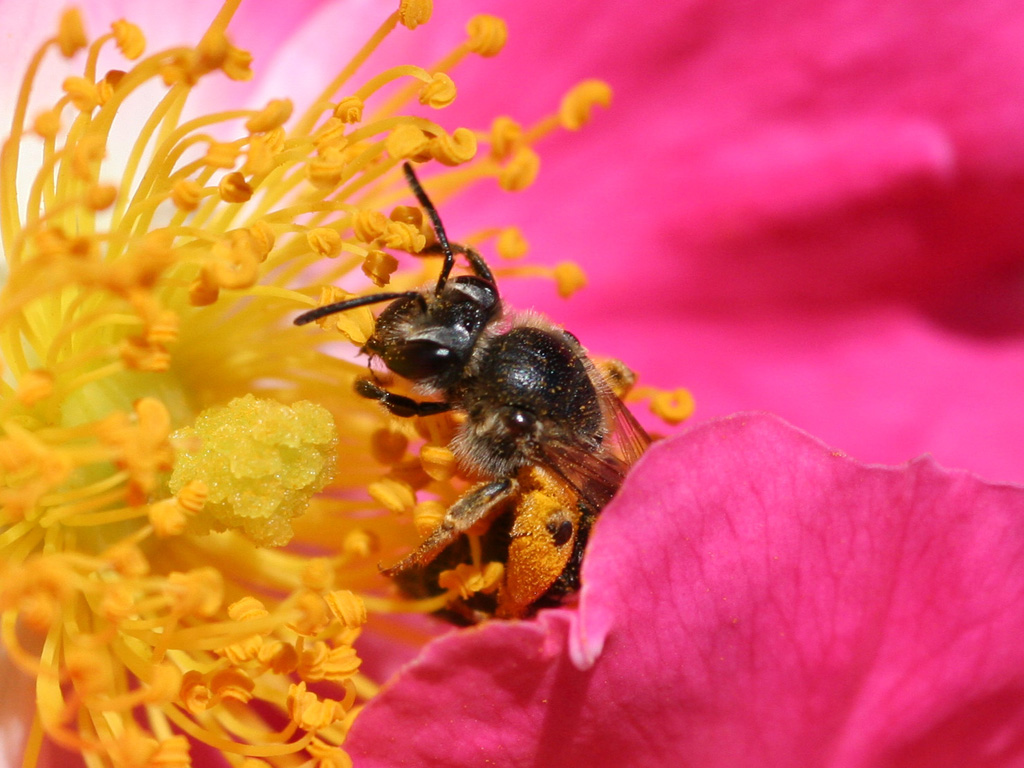
An Andrena bee gathers pollen from the stamens of a rose. The female carpel structure appears rough and globular to the left.

The most essential staple food crops on the planet, like wheat, maize, rice, soybeans and sorghum are wind pollinated or self pollinating. When considering the top 15 crops contributing to the human diet globally in 2013, slightly over 10% of the total human diet of plant crops (211 out of 1916 kcal/person/day) is dependent upon insect pollination.

Pollination management is a branch of agriculture that seeks to protect and enhance present pollinators and often involves the culture and addition of pollinators in monoculture situations, such as commercial fruit orchards. The largest managed pollination event in the world is in California almond orchards, where nearly half (about one million hives) of the US honey bees are trucked to the almond orchards each spring. New York's apple crop requires about 30,000 hives; Maine's blueberry crop uses about 50,000 hives each year. The US solution to the pollinator shortage, so far, has been for commercial beekeepers to become pollination contractors and to migrate. Just as the combine harvesters follow the wheat harvest from Texas to Manitoba, beekeepers follow the bloom from south to north, to provide pollination for many different crops.

In America, bees are brought to commercial plantings of cucumbers, squash, melons, strawberries, and many other crops. Honey bees are not the only managed pollinators: a few other species of bees are also raised as pollinators. The alfalfa leafcutter bee is an important pollinator for alfalfa seed in western United States and Canada. Bumblebees are increasingly raised and used extensively for greenhouse tomatoes and other crops.

The ecological and financial importance of natural pollination by insects to agricultural crops, improving their quality and quantity, becomes more and more appreciated and has given rise to new financial opportunities. The vicinity of a forest or wild grasslands with native pollinators near agricultural crops, such as apples, almonds or coffee can improve their yield by about 20%. The benefits of native pollinators may result in forest owners demanding payment for their contribution in the improved crop results – a simple example of the economic value of ecological services. Farmers can also raise native crops in order to promote native bee pollinator species as shown with the native sweat bees L. vierecki in Delaware and L. leucozonium in southwest Virginia.

The American Institute of Biological Sciences reports that native insect pollination saves the United States agricultural economy nearly an estimated $3.1 billion annually through natural crop production; pollination produces some $40 billion worth of products annually in the United States alone.

Pollination of food crops has become an environmental issue, due to two trends. The trend to monoculture means that greater concentrations of pollinators are needed at bloom time than ever before, yet the area is forage poor or even deadly to bees for the rest of the season. The other trend is the decline of pollinator populations, due to pesticide misuse and overuse, new diseases and parasites of bees, clearcut logging, decline of beekeeping, suburban development, removal of hedges and other habitat from farms, and public concern about bees. Widespread aerial spraying for mosquitoes due to West Nile fears is causing an acceleration of the loss of pollinators. Changes in land use, harmful pesticides, and advancing climate change threaten wild pollinators, key insect species that increase yields of three-fourths of crop varieties and are critical to growing healthy foods.

In some situations, farmers or horticulturists may aim to restrict natural pollination to only permit breeding with the preferred individuals plants. This may be achieved through the use of pollination bags.

=== Improving pollination in areas with suboptimal bee densities ===
In some instances growers' demand for beehives far exceeds the available supply. The number of managed beehives in the US has steadily declined from close to 6 million after WWII, to less than 2.5 million today. In contrast, the area dedicated to growing bee-pollinated crops has grown over 300% in the same time period. Additionally, in the past five years there has been a decline in winter managed beehives, which has reached an unprecedented rate of colony losses at near 30%. At present, there is an enormous demand for beehive rentals that cannot always be met. There is a clear need across the agricultural industry for a management tool to draw pollinators into cultivations and encourage them to preferentially visit and pollinate the flowering crop. By attracting pollinators like honey bees and increasing their foraging behavior, particularly in the center of large plots, we can increase grower returns and optimize yield from their plantings. ISCA Technologies, from Riverside, California, created a semiochemical formulation called SPLAT Bloom, that modifies the behavior of honey bees, inciting them to visit flowers in every portion of the field.

== Environmental impacts ==
Loss of pollinators, also known as pollinator decline (of which colony collapse disorder is perhaps the most well known) has been noticed in recent years. These loss of pollinators have caused a disturbance in early plant regeneration processes such as seed dispersal and pollination. Early processes of plant regeneration greatly depend on plant-animal interactions and because these interactions are interrupted, biodiversity and ecosystem functioning are threatened. Pollination by animals aids in the genetic variability and diversity within plants because it allows for out-crossing instead for self-crossing. Without this genetic diversity there would be a lack of traits for natural selection to act on for the survival of the plant species. Seed dispersal is also important for plant fitness because it allows plants the ability to expand their populations. More than that, it permits plants to escape environments that have changed and have become difficult to reside in. All of these factors show the importance of pollinators for plants, which are a significant part of the foundation for a stable ecosystem. If only a few species of plants depended on Loss of pollinators is especially devastating because there are so many plant species rely on them. More than 87.5% of angiosperms, over 75% of tropical tree species, and 30–40% of tree species in temperate regions depend on pollination and seed dispersal.

Factors that contribute to pollinator decline include habitat destruction, pesticide, parasitism/diseases, and climate change. The more destructive forms of human disturbances are land use changes such as fragmentation, selective logging, and the conversion to secondary forest habitat. Defaunation of frugivores is also an important driver. These alterations are especially harmful due to the sensitivity of the pollination process of plants. Research on tropical palms found that defaunation has caused a decline in seed dispersal, which causes a decrease in genetic variability in this species. Habitat destruction such as fragmentation and selective logging remove areas that are most optimal for the different types of pollinators, which removes pollinators food resources, nesting sites, and leads to isolation of populations. The effect of pesticides on pollinators has been debated because it is difficult to determine that a single pesticide is the cause as opposed to a mixture or other threats. Whether exposure alone causes damage, or if the duration and potency are also factors is unknown. However, insecticides have negative effects, as in the case of neonicotinoids that harm bee colonies. Many researchers believe it is the synergistic effects of these factors which are ultimately detrimental to pollinator populations.

In the agriculture industry, climate change is causing a "pollinator crisis". This crisis is affecting the production of crops, and the relating costs, due to a decrease in pollination processes. This disturbance can be phenological or spatial. In the first case, species that normally occur in similar seasons or time cycles, now have different responses to environmental changes and therefore no longer interact. For example, a tree may flower sooner than usual, while the pollinator may reproduce later in the year and therefore the two species no longer coincide in time. Spatial disturbances occur when two species that would normally share the same distribution now respond differently to climate change and are shifting to different regions.

=== Examples of affected pollinators ===
The most known and understood pollinator, bees, have been used as the prime example of the decline in pollinators. Bees are essential in the pollination of agricultural crops and wild plants and are one of the main insects that perform this task. Out of the bees species, the honey bee or Apis mellifera has been studied the most and in the United States, there has been a loss of 59% of colonies from 1947 to 2005. The decrease in populations of the honey bee have been attributed to pesticides, genetically modified crops, fragmentation, parasites and diseases that have been introduced. There has been a focus on neonicotinoids effects on honey bee populations. Neonicotinoids insecticides have been used due to its low mammalian toxicity, target specificity, low application rates, and broad spectrum activity. However, the insecticides are able to make its way throughout the plant, which includes the pollen and nectar. Due to this, it has been shown to effect on the nervous system and colony relations in the honey bee populations.

Butterflies too have suffered due to these modifications. Butterflies are helpful ecological indicators since they are sensitive to changes within the environment like the season, altitude, and above all, human impact on the environment. Butterfly populations were higher within the natural forest and were lower in open land. The reason for the difference in density is the fact that in open land the butterflies would be exposed to desiccation and predation. These open regions are caused by habitat destruction like logging for timber, livestock grazing, and firewood collection. Due to this destruction, butterfly species' diversity can decrease and it is known that there is a correlation in butterfly diversity and plant diversity.

=== Food security and pollinator decline ===
Besides the imbalance of the ecosystem caused by the decline in pollinators, it may jeopardise food security. Pollination is necessary for plants to continue their populations and 3/4 of the plant species that contribute to the world's food supply are plants that require pollinators. Insect pollinators, like bees, are large contributors to crop production, over 200 billion dollars' worth of crop species are pollinated by these insects. Pollinators are also essential because they improve crop quality and increase genetic diversity, which is necessary in producing fruit with nutritional value and various flavors. Crops that do not depend on animals for pollination but on the wind or self-pollination, like corn and potatoes, have doubled in production and make up a large part of the human diet but do not provide the micronutrients that are needed. The essential nutrients that are necessary in the human diet are present in plants that rely on animal pollinators. There have been issues in vitamin and mineral deficiencies and it is believed that if pollinator populations continue to decrease these deficiencies will become even more prominent.

== Plant–pollinator networks ==
Wild pollinators often visit a large number of plant species and plants are visited by a large number of pollinator species. All these relations together form a network of interactions between plants and pollinators. Surprising similarities were found in the structure of networks consisting out of the interactions between plants and pollinators. This structure was found to be similar in very different ecosystems on different continents, consisting of entirely different species.

The structure of plant-pollinator networks may have large consequences for the way in which pollinator communities respond to increasingly harsh conditions. Mathematical models, examining the consequences of this network structure for the stability of pollinator communities suggest that the specific way in which plant-pollinator networks are organized minimizes competition between pollinators and may even lead to strong indirect facilitation between pollinators when conditions are harsh. This means that pollinator species together can survive under harsh conditions. But it also means that pollinator species collapse simultaneously when conditions pass a critical point. This simultaneous collapse occurs, because pollinator species depend on each other when surviving under difficult conditions.

Such a community-wide collapse, involving many pollinator species, can occur suddenly when increasingly harsh conditions pass a critical point and recovery from such a collapse might not be easy. The improvement in conditions needed for pollinators to recover, could be substantially larger than the improvement needed to return to conditions at which the pollinator community collapsed.

== Economics of commercial honeybee pollination ==
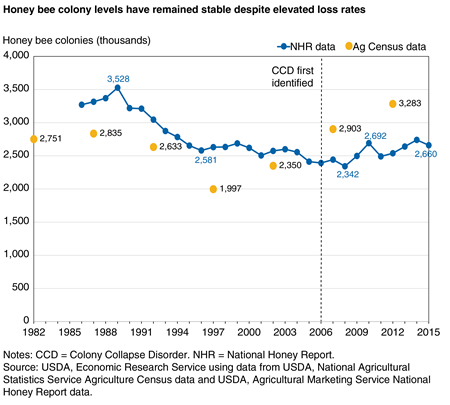
The graph shows the number of honeybee colonies in the U.S. from 1982 to 2015,

While there are 200,000 – 350,000 different species of animals that help pollination, honeybees are responsible for majority of the pollination for consumed crops, providing between $235 and $577 US billion of benefits to global food production. The western honey bee (Apis mellifera L.) provides highly valued pollination services for a wide variety of agricultural crops, and ranks as the most frequent single species of pollinator for crops worldwide. Since the early 1900s, beekeepers in the United States started renting out their colonies to farmers to increase the farmer's crop yields, earning additional revenue from providing privatized pollination. As of 2016, 41% of an average US beekeeper's revenue comes from providing such pollination service to farmers, making it the biggest proportion of their income, with the rest coming from sales of honey, beeswax, government subsidy, etc. This is an example of how a positive externality, pollination of crops from beekeeping and honey-making, was successfully accounted for and incorporated into the overall market for agriculture. On top of assisting food production, pollination service provide beneficial spillovers as bees germinate not only the crops, but also other plants around the area that they are set loose to pollinate, increasing biodiversity for the local ecosystem. There is even further spillover as biodiversity increases ecosystem resistance for wildlife and crops. Due to their role of pollination in crop production, commercial honeybees are considered to be livestock by the US Department of Agriculture. The impact of pollination varies by crop. For example, almond production in the United States, an $11 billion industry based almost exclusively in the state of California, is heavily dependent on imported honeybees for pollination of almond trees. Almond industry uses up to 82% of the services in the pollination market. Each February, around 60% of the all bee colonies in the US are moved to California's Central Valley.

Over the past decade, beekeepers across the US have reported that the mortality rate of their bee colonies has stayed constant at about 30% every year, making the deaths an expected cost of business for the beekeepers. While the exact cause of this phenomenon is unknown, according to the US Department of Agriculture Colony Collapse Disorder Progress Report it can be traced to factors such as pollution, pesticides, and pathogens from evidences found in areas of the colonies affected and the colonies themselves. Pollution and pesticides are detrimental to the health of the bees and their colonies as the bees' ability to pollinate and return to their colonies are great greatly compromised. Moreover, California's Central Valley is determined by the World Health Organization as the location of country's worst air pollution. Almond pollinating bees, approximately 60% of the bees in the US as mentioned above, will be mixed with bees from thousands of other hives provided by different beekeepers, making them exponentially susceptible to diseases and mites that any of them could be carrying. The deaths do not stop at commercial honeybees as there is evidence of significant pathogen spillover to other pollinators including wild bumble bees, infecting up to 35–100% of wild bees within 2 km radius of commercial pollination. The negative externality of private pollination services is the decline of biodiversity through the deaths of commercial and wild bees.

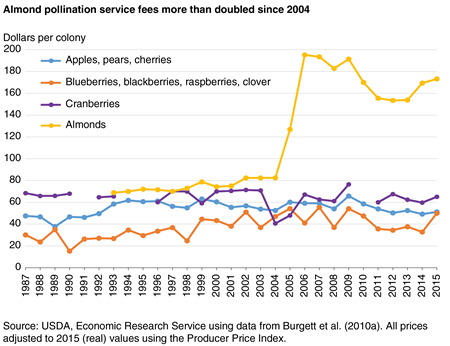
The graph shows the average dollar amount per colonies received by beekeepers depending on the pollinated crop.

Despite losing about a third of their workforce every year, beekeepers continue to rent out their bees to almond farms due to the high pay from the almond industry. In 2016, a colony rented out for almond pollination gave beekeepers an income of $165 per colony rented, around three times from average of other crops that use the pollination rental service. However, a recent study published in Oxford Academic's Journal of Economic Entomology found that once the costs for maintaining bees specifically for almond pollination, including overwintering, summer management, and the replacement dying bees are considered, almond pollination is barely or not profitable for average beekeepers.

== See also ==
- Canadian Pollination Initiative
- Cheating (biology)
- Floral color change
- Pollinator-mediated selection
- Fruit tree pollination
- Hand-pollination
- Paul Knuth
- Hermann Müller (botanist)
- Plant reproductive morphology
- Pollen DNA barcoding
- Polli:Nation

== Notes ==
- Crepet WL, Friis EM, Nixon KC (1991). "Fossil evidence for the evolution of biotic pollination [and discussion]". Philosophical Transactions: Biological Sciences. 333 (1267): 187–195. doi:10.1098/rstb.1991.0067.
- Dafni A, Kevan PG, Husband BC (2005). Practical Pollination Biology. Enviroquest, Ltd. ISBN 978-0-9680123-0-7.
- Labandeira CC, Kvacek J, Mostovski MB (2007). "Pollination drops, pollen and insect pollination of Mesozoic gymnosperms". Taxon. 56 (3): 663–695. Bibcode:2007Taxon..56..663L. doi:10.2307/25065852. JSTOR 25065852.
- Sihag RC (1997). Pollination Biology: Basic and Applied Principles. Hisar: Rajendra Scientific Publishers. p. 210.
