= Caloptilia scutellariella =

Scientific classification
- Domain: Eukaryota
- Kingdom: Animalia
- Phylum: Arthropoda
- Class: Insecta
- Order: Lepidoptera
- Family: Gracillariidae
- Genus: Caloptilia
- Species: C. scutellariella

Binomial name
- Caloptilia scutellariella (Braun, 1923)

Species of moth

Caloptilia scutellariella is a moth of the family Gracillariidae. It has been recommended that this species be further studied as its placement within the genus Caloptilia is in need of clarification. It is known from Ontario, Canada, and Ohio and Michigan in the United States.

The number of generations depends on the food plant. Larvae feeding on Scutellaria ovata produce one generation per year, while larvae feeding on Scutellaria incana produce multiple continuous generations throughout the year.

The larvae feed on Scutellaria incana, Scutellaria galericulata, Scutellaria ovata and Scutellaria versicolor. They mine the leaves of their host plant. On S. ovata, the mine has the form of a white full-depth blotch mine.
