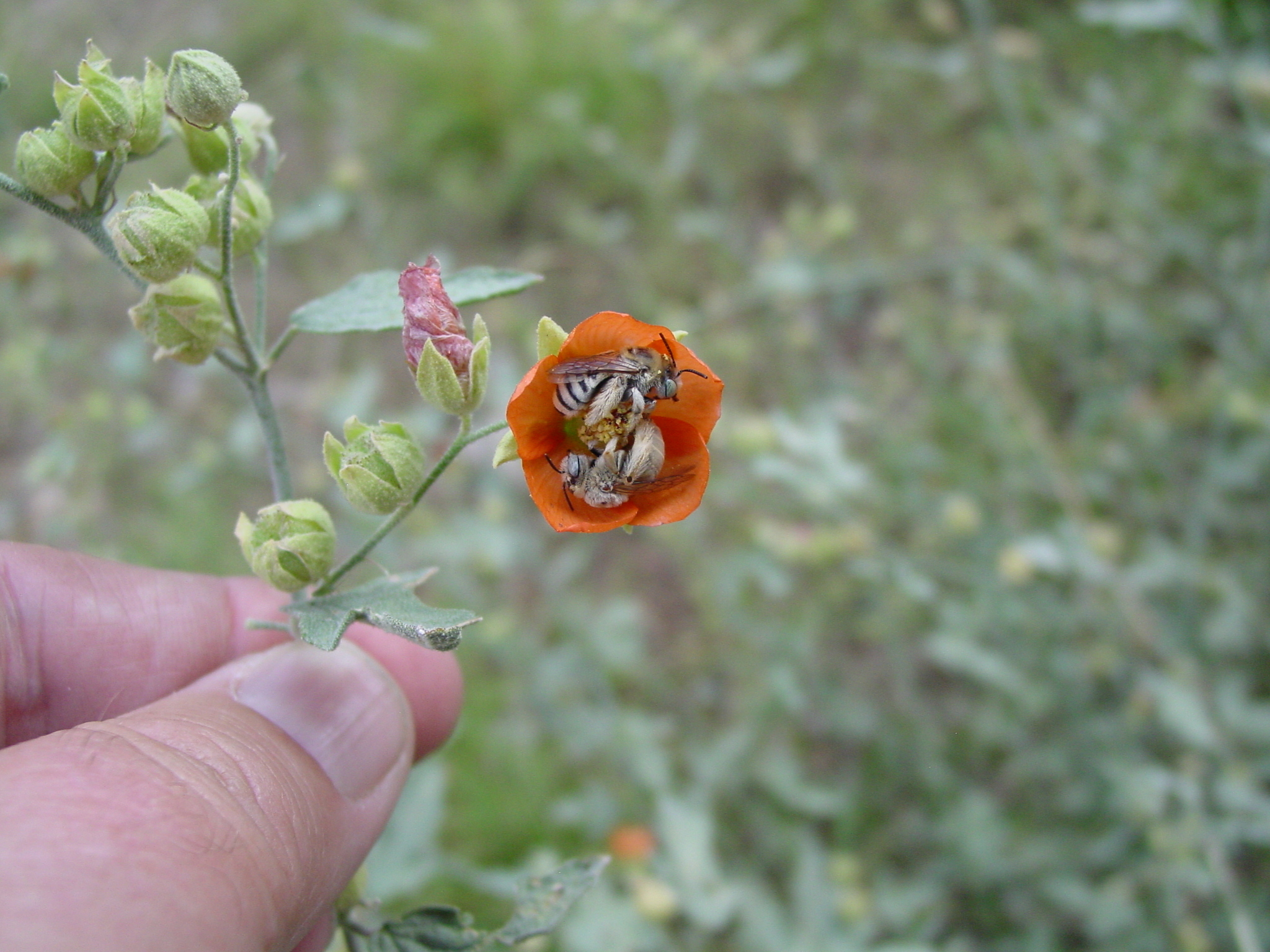

Scientific classification
- Kingdom: Animalia
- Phylum: Arthropoda
- Class: Insecta
- Order: Hymenoptera
- Family: Apidae
- Tribe: Eucerini
- Genus: Melissodes
- Species: M. tristis

Binomial name
- Melissodes tristis Cockerell, 1894

= Melissodes tristis =

Species of bee

Melissodes tristis is a species of long-horned bee in the family Apidae. It is found in Central America and North America.
