= Melissodes paroselae =

Scientific classification
- Domain: Eukaryota
- Kingdom: Animalia
- Phylum: Arthropoda
- Class: Insecta
- Order: Hymenoptera
- Family: Apidae
- Tribe: Eucerini
- Genus: Melissodes
- Species: M. paroselae

Binomial name
- Melissodes paroselae Cockerell, 1905

Species of bee

Melissodes paroselae, the parosela long-horned bee, is a species of long-horned bee in the family Apidae. It is found in Central America and North America.
