= Melissodes robustior =

Scientific classification
- Kingdom: Animalia
- Phylum: Arthropoda
- Class: Insecta
- Order: Hymenoptera
- Family: Apidae
- Tribe: Eucerini
- Genus: Melissodes
- Species: M. robustior

Binomial name
- Melissodes robustior Cockerell, 1915

Species of bee

Melissodes robustior, the robust long-horned bee, is a species of long-horned bee in the family Apidae. It is found on the West Coast of North America.

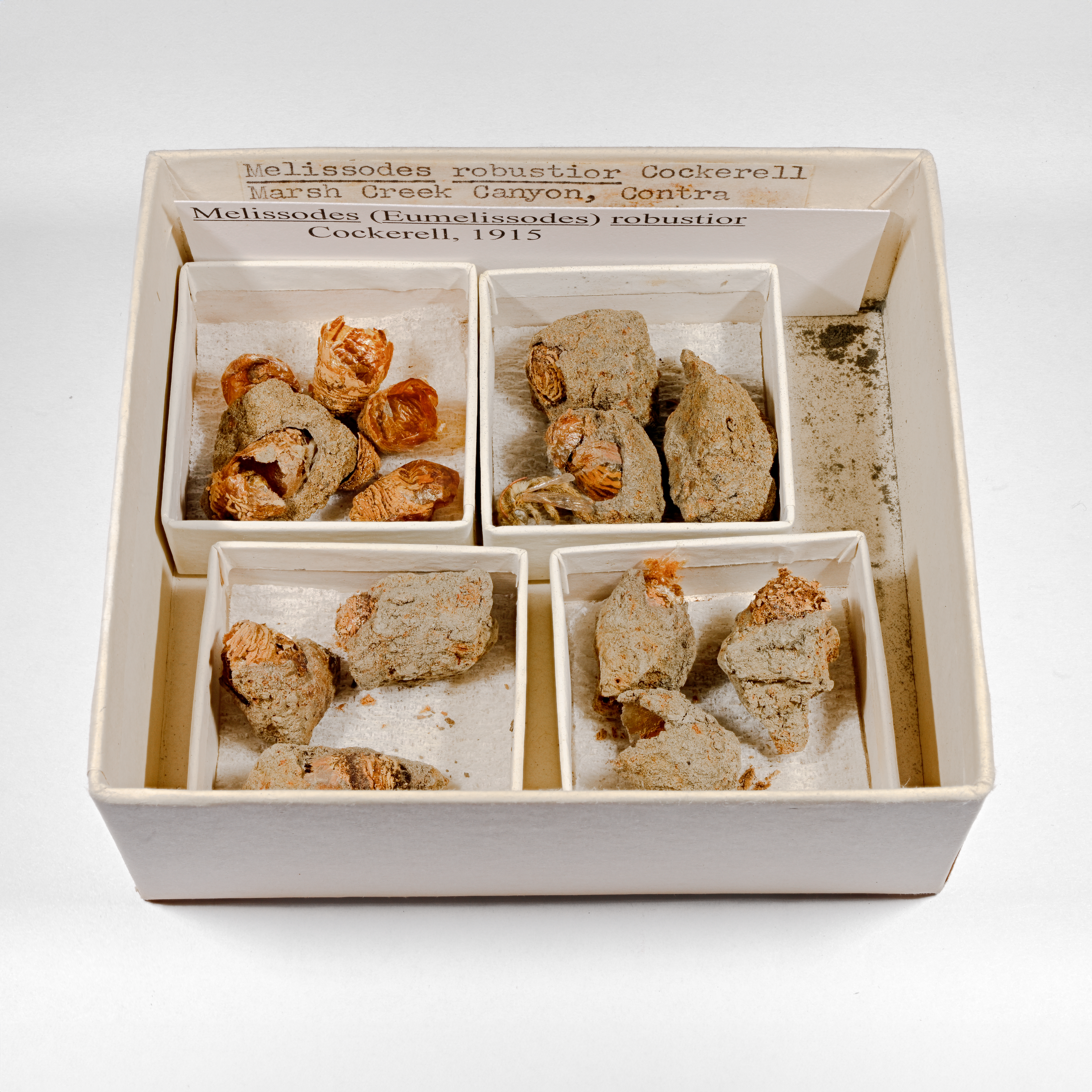
From the collections of the Essig Museum of Entomology, photographed 2023 by Hugo Sappington
