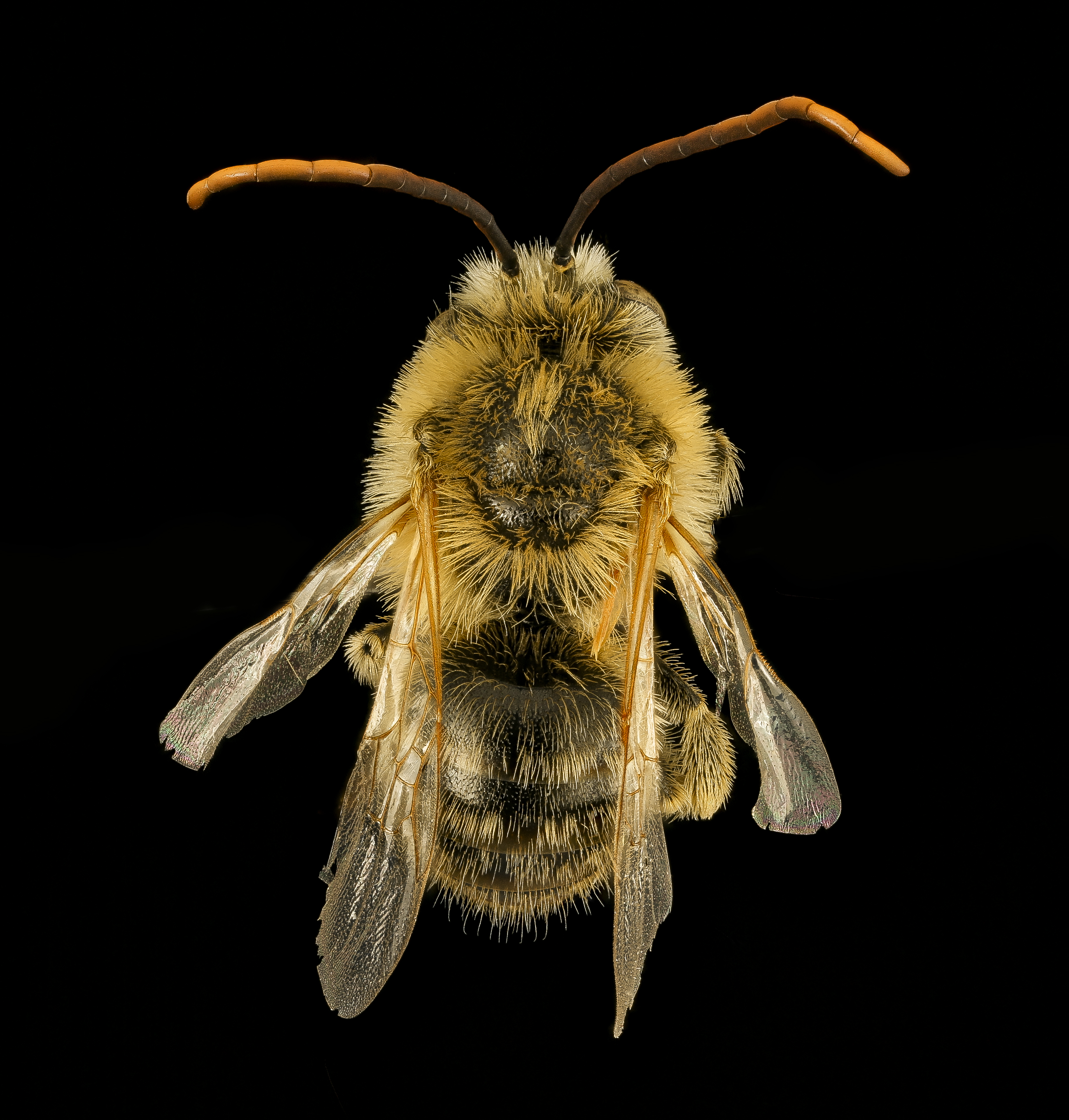

Scientific classification
- Domain: Eukaryota
- Kingdom: Animalia
- Phylum: Arthropoda
- Class: Insecta
- Order: Hymenoptera
- Family: Apidae
- Tribe: Eucerini
- Genus: Melissodes
- Species: M. trinodis

Binomial name
- Melissodes trinodis Robertson, 1901

= Melissodes trinodis =

Species of bee

Melissodes trinodis is a species of long-horned bee in the family Apidae. It is found in North America.
