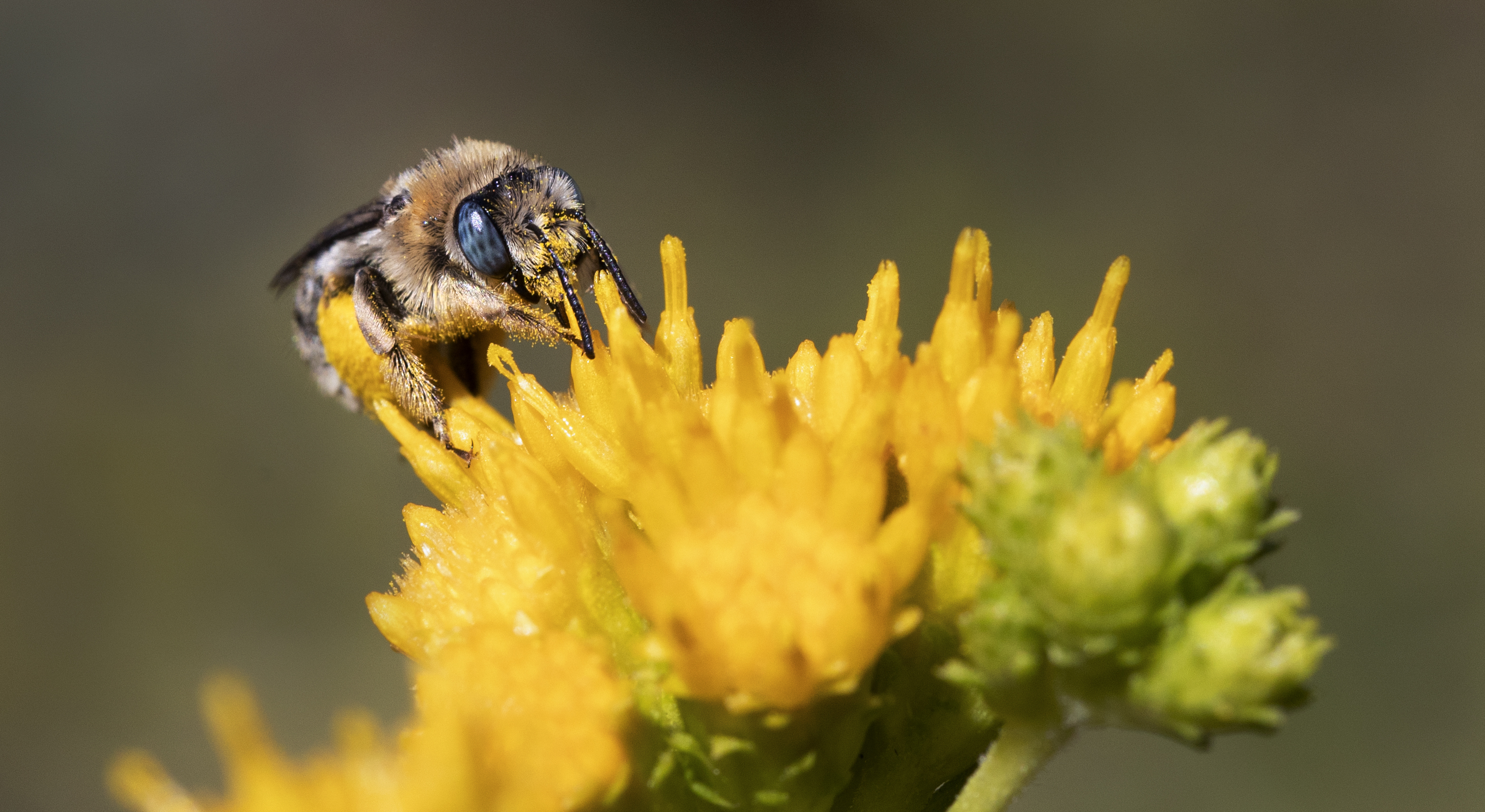

Scientific classification
- Kingdom: Animalia
- Phylum: Arthropoda
- Class: Insecta
- Order: Hymenoptera
- Family: Apidae
- Tribe: Eucerini
- Genus: Melissodes
- Species: M. stearnsi

Binomial name
- Melissodes stearnsi Cockerell, 1905

= Melissodes stearnsi =

Species of bee

Melissodes stearnsi is a species of long-horned bee in the family Apidae. It is found in North America.
