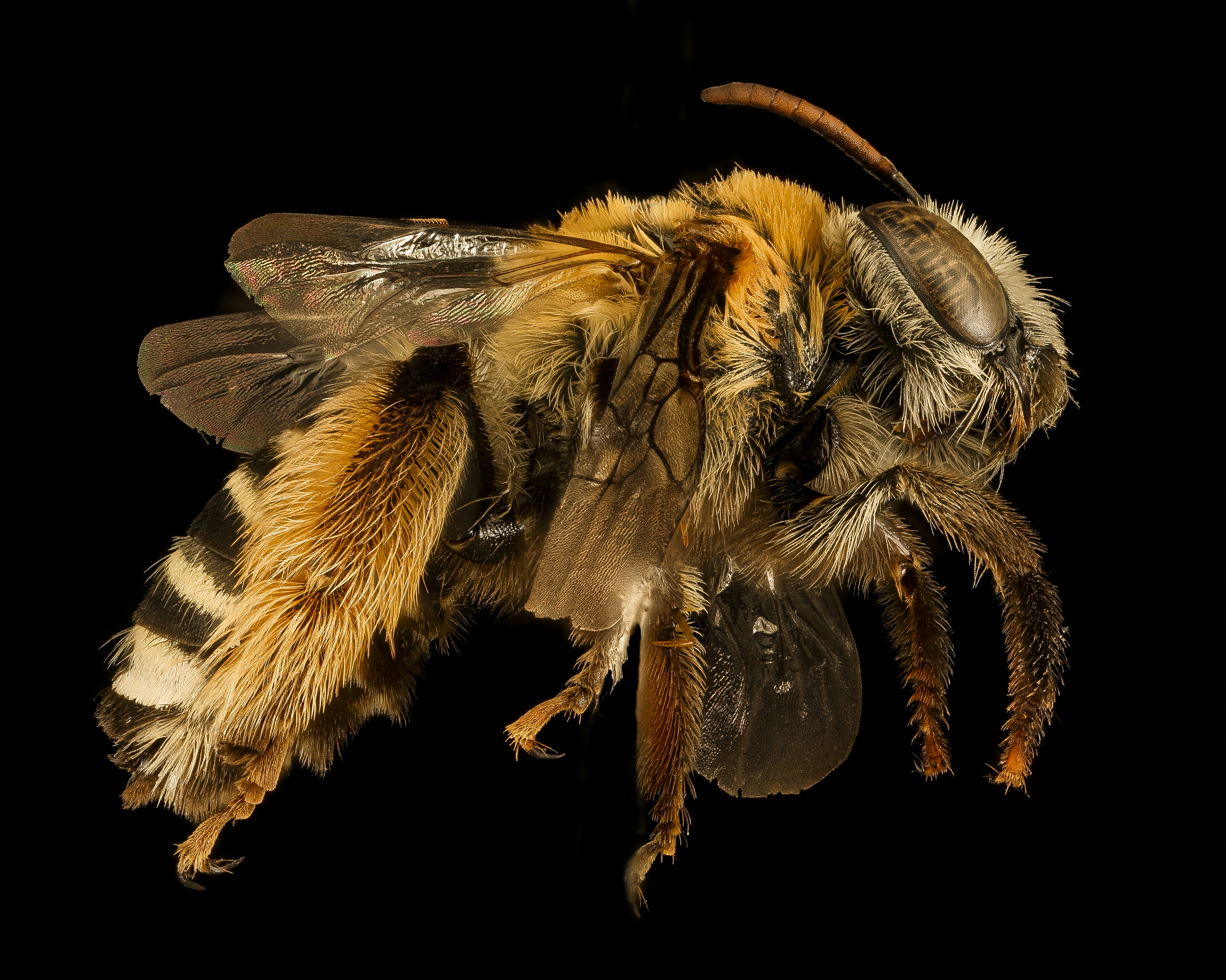
- Female

Scientific classification
- Domain: Eukaryota
- Kingdom: Animalia
- Phylum: Arthropoda
- Class: Insecta
- Order: Hymenoptera
- Family: Apidae
- Genus: Melissodes
- Species: M. tepaneca

Binomial name
- Melissodes tepaneca Cresson, 1878

= Melissodes tepaneca =

Species of bee

Melissodes tepaneca, the tepanec long-horned bee, is a species of long-horned bee in the family Apidae. It is found in Central America and North America.

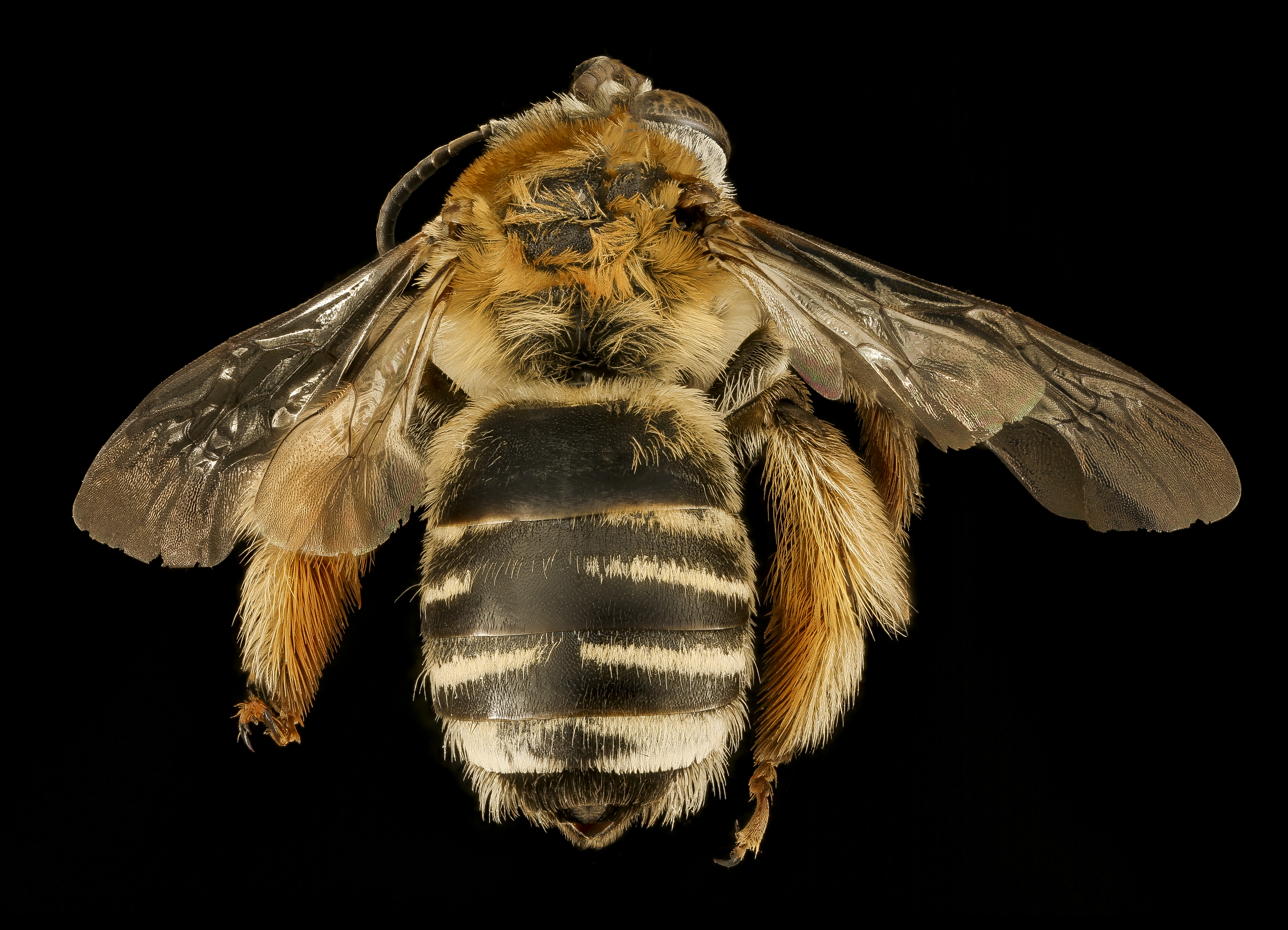
