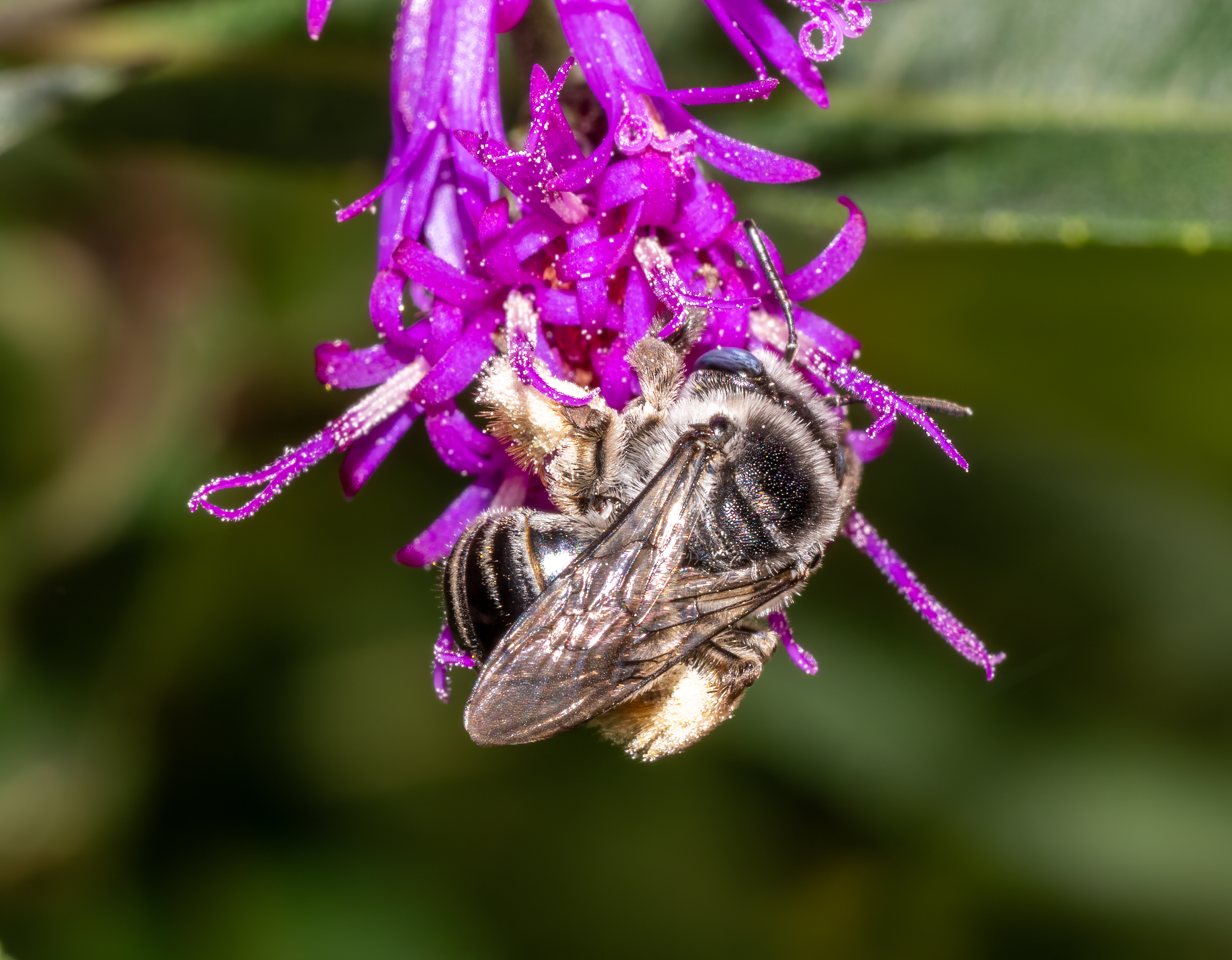

Scientific classification
- Kingdom: Animalia
- Phylum: Arthropoda
- Class: Insecta
- Order: Hymenoptera
- Family: Apidae
- Genus: Melissodes
- Species: M. denticulatus

Binomial name
- Melissodes denticulatus Smith, 1854

= Melissodes denticulatus =

Species of bee

Melissodes denticulatus is a species of long-horned bee in the family Apidae. It is found in North America. This species can usually be found around ironweed which makes it easier to identify compared to other species in the Melissodes genus.
