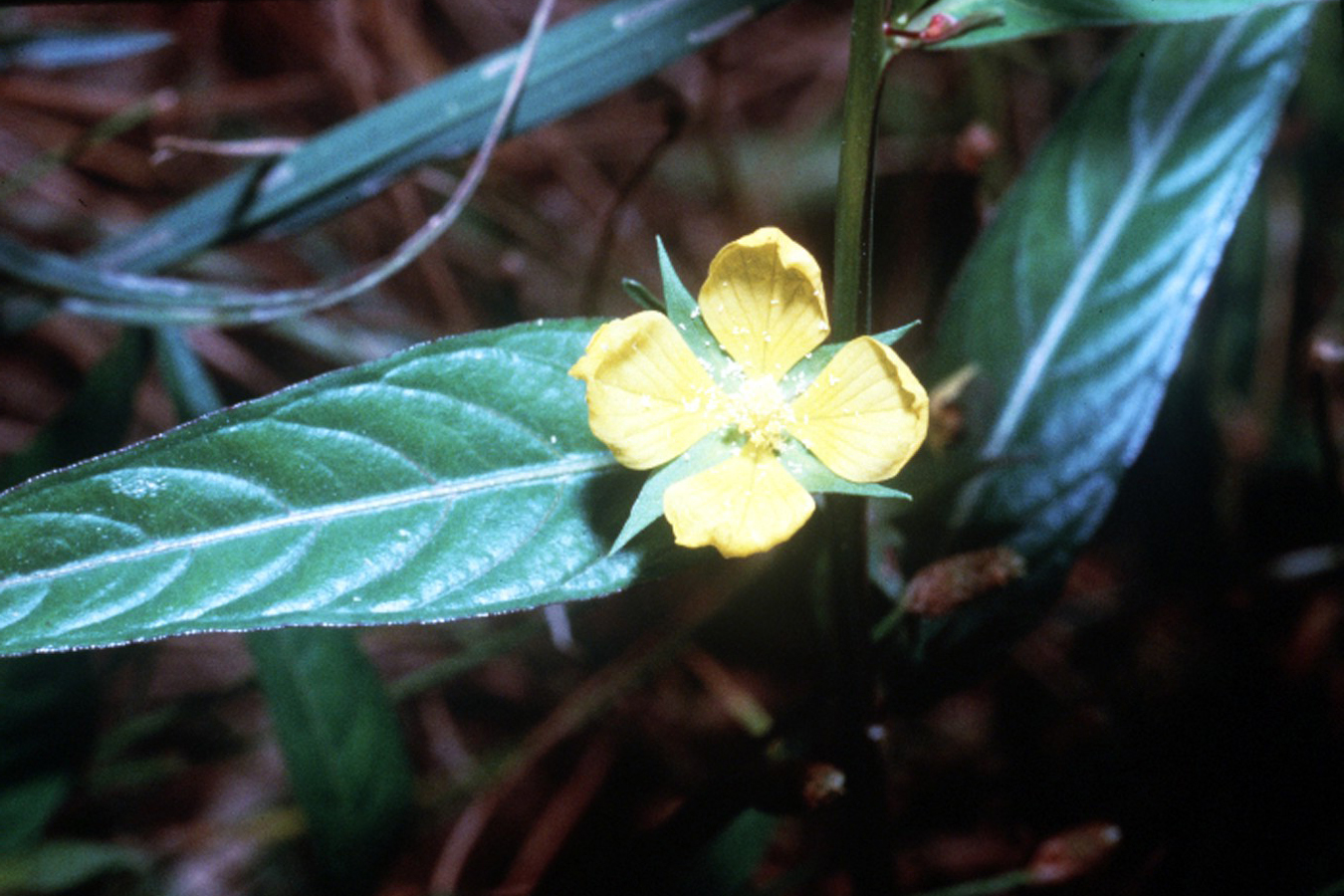

Conservation status
- Least Concern (IUCN 3.1)

- Secure (NatureServe)

Scientific classification
- Kingdom: Plantae
- Clade: Embryophytes
- Clade: Tracheophytes
- Clade: Angiosperms
- Clade: Eudicots
- Clade: Rosids
- Order: Myrtales
- Family: Onagraceae
- Genus: Ludwigia
- Species: L. alternifolia

Binomial name
- Ludwigia alternifolia L.

Synonyms
- Isnardia alternifolia (L.) DC.; Ludwigia alternifolia var. typica Munz; Isnardia alternifolia var. salicifolia (Poir.) DC.; Isnardia alternifolia var. uniflora (Raf.) DC.; Isnardia aurantiaca DC.; Ludwigia alternifolia var. linearifolia Britton; Ludwigia alternifolia var. pubescens E.J.Palmer & Steyerm.; Ludwigia angustifolia var. ramosissima (Walter) Poir.; Ludwigia aurantiaca Raf.; Ludwigia macrocarpa Michx.; Ludwigia microcarpa Link; Ludwigia pruinosa Raf.; Ludwigia ramosissima Walter; Ludwigia salicifolia Poir.; Ludwigia uniflora Raf.

= Ludwigia alternifolia =

Species of flowering plant in the willowherb family

Ludwigia alternifolia, commonly known as seedbox, bushy seedbox, rattlebox, and square-pod water-primrose, is a herbaceous perennial plant of the family Onagraceae (evening primrose family). It is native to central and eastern North America, growing in marshes, wet meadows, and swamps. It has yellow, four-petaled flowers and brown seed pods that are shaped like a cube.

== Description ==
Ludwigia alternifolia grows 2–3 feet (61–91 cm) tall on reddish-tinged stems. Leaves are deep green, sharply-pointed, and lance-shaped. They are arranged alternately on the stem and are 1.25–4 in (3–10 cm) long and 0.25–0.75 in (1–2 cm) across. The margins are smooth and sometimes slightly ciliate or reddish. The leaves either have short petioles or are sessile.

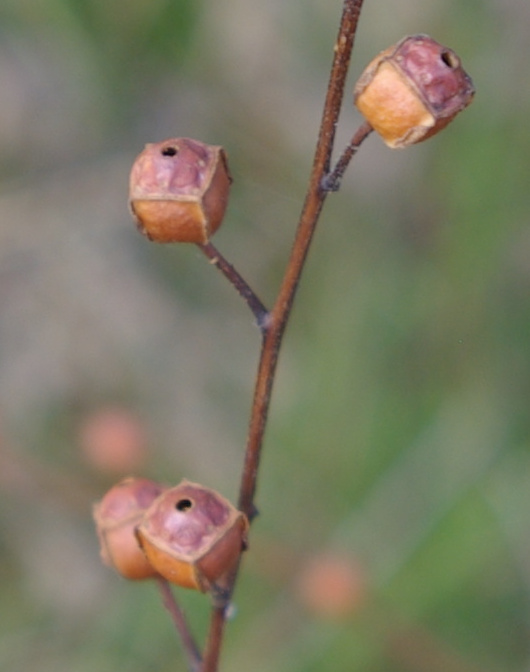
Fruits of Ludwigia alternifolia

Flowers are usually single, growing from the leaf axils on upper leaves. They have four yellow petals and four light green sepals. The mature fruits are brown, cubic capsules with rigid sides, about 0.25 in (0.6 cm) in length.

== Etymology ==
The genus name Ludwiga is for the 18th century German botanist, Christian Gottlieb Ludwig. The species name alternifolia references the fact that the leaves are alternate.

== Distribution and habitat ==
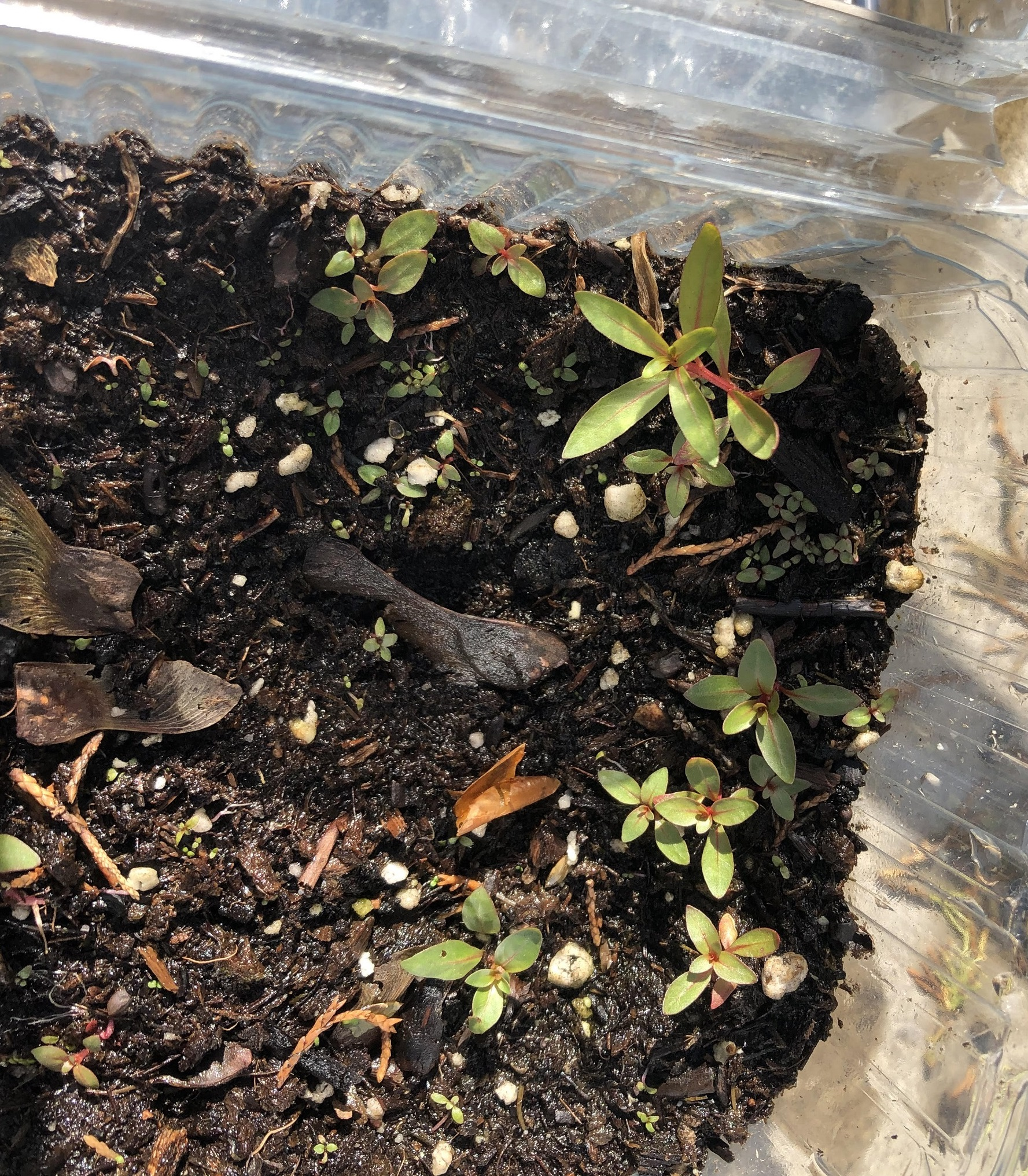
Ludwigia alternifolia (Seedbox) winter sowed ON Canada

It is native to southern Quebec and Ontario to Kansas and south to Texas and Florida. It grows in habitats that have full to partial sun and wet to moist soil, such as marshes, wet meadows, and swamps.

== Ecology ==
Ludwigia alternifolia is insect pollinated and is recorded to have been visited in northern Florida by Melissodes comptoides.
