= Melissodes ablusus =

Scientific classification
- Kingdom: Animalia
- Phylum: Arthropoda
- Class: Insecta
- Order: Hymenoptera
- Family: Apidae
- Genus: Melissodes
- Species: M. ablusus

Binomial name
- Melissodes ablusus Cockerell, 1926

Species of bee

Melissodes ablusus is a species of long-horned bee in the family Apidae. It is native to, and located in, the United States of America. Discovered by Theodore Dru Alison Cockerell in 1926; this bee is in the Eucerini tribe, or the "true-horned bees," meaning the males of this species have disproportionately large antenna, as well as being a solitary therefore it does not create large colonies nor does it store honey, but instead, the females create ground dwelling nests by themselves.
