= Melissodes verbesinarum =

Scientific classification
- Kingdom: Animalia
- Phylum: Arthropoda
- Class: Insecta
- Order: Hymenoptera
- Family: Apidae
- Genus: Melissodes
- Species: M. verbesinarum

Binomial name
- Melissodes verbesinarum Cockerell, 1905

Species of bee

Melissodes verbesinarum is a species of long-horned bees found in the south western United States and central Mexico.

== Description ==
Females are identifiable by being more robust than other Melissodes; darker hairs on inner side of basal joint of hind tarsi; flagellum, after the first two joints, bright rusty color on the underside; basal band of second abdominal (T2) segment broad and very white; hairs of thorax are paler near the head; eyes pale sea-green. Appears similar to easily be taken for an undersized M. pallidicincta, but the much narrower face at once distinguishes it.

== Ecology ==
M. verbesinarum nectars on Helianthus annuus without pollinating it.
