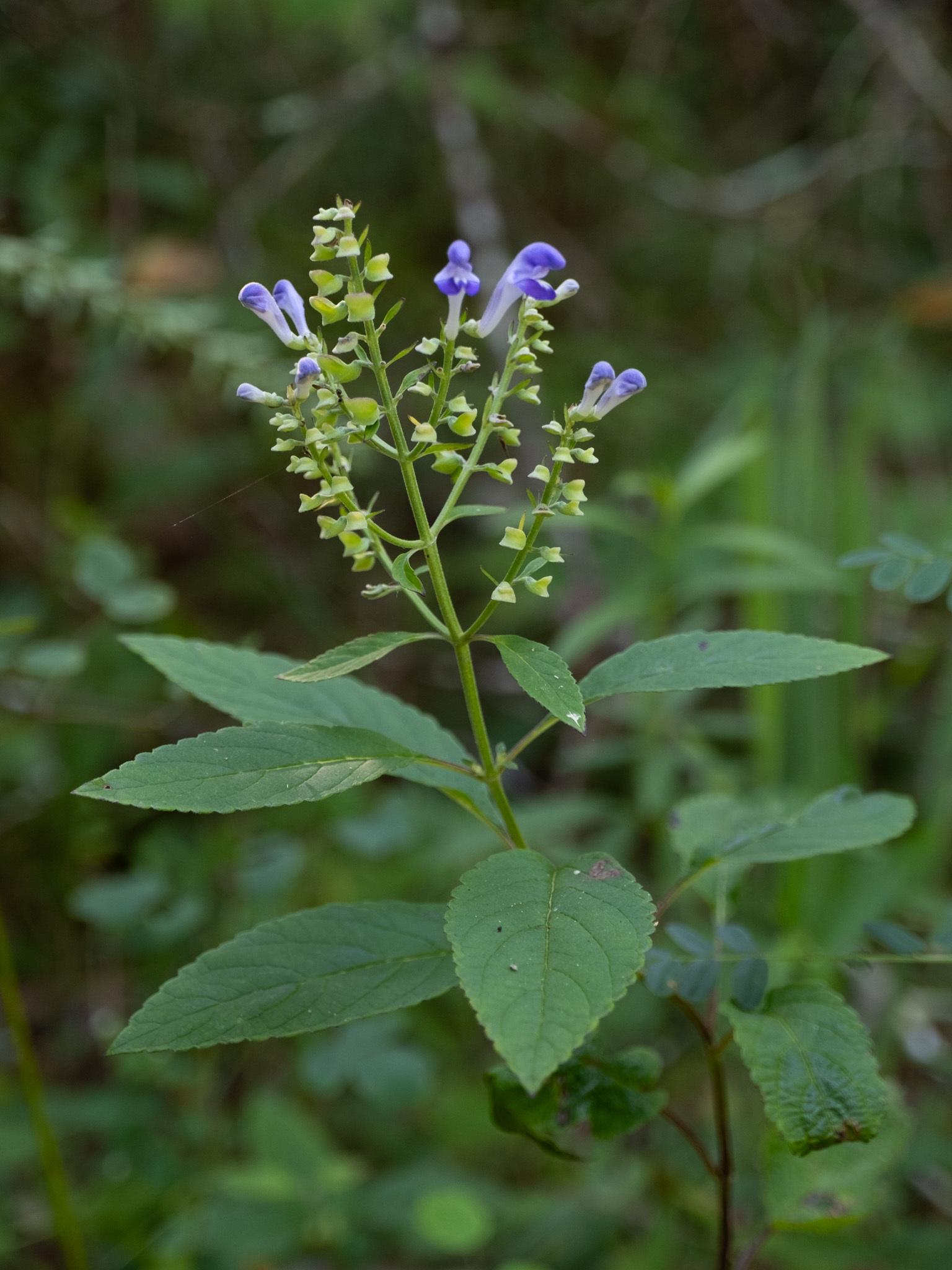

Conservation status
- Secure (NatureServe)

Scientific classification
- Kingdom: Plantae
- Clade: Embryophytes
- Clade: Tracheophytes
- Clade: Spermatophytes
- Clade: Angiosperms
- Clade: Eudicots
- Clade: Asterids
- Order: Lamiales
- Family: Lamiaceae
- Genus: Scutellaria
- Species: S. incana

Binomial name
- Scutellaria incana Spreng.

= Scutellaria incana =

Species of flowering plant

Scutellaria incana, the hoary skullcap or downy skullcap, is a species of perennial flowering plant in the mint family Lamiaceae. It is native to North America and is primarily found in the eastern United States as well as some parts of the Midwest.

== Description ==
S. incana grows to about 1 m (3 ft) tall with stems that are unbranched (or branched only near the top) and have short, dense, gray hairs. As with many other plants in the mint family, its stems are 4-angled (square). The leaves are opposite and are ovate, measuring up to 15 cm (6 in) long. They have coarse, blunt teeth and are covered by fine hair.

Purplish blue flowers occur in a dense raceme measuring about 15 cm (6 in) long at or near the end of the stem. The corolla has 2 lips; the upper lip is hooded (the "skullcap") and the lower lip is larger and broader with a white patch near the throat.

== Etymology ==
The genus name Scutellaria is from the Latin word scutella, small dish or saucer, referring to shape of the persistent calyx after the flowers fade. Incana is Latin for hoary or very grey.

== Distribution and habitat ==
The plant is native in the United States from Texas to the west, Florida to the south, Wisconsin to the north, and New York to the east. It can be found in mesic to mesic-dry, partially shady habitats, including upland forests, rocky woodland slopes, thinly wooded bluffs, rocky slopes along rivers, upland meadows in wooded areas, thickets, and along roadsides in woodlands.

== Ecology ==
The flowers bloom in late summer and are pollinated primarily by bumblebees. Other insects visit the plant to drink the nectar.

Scutellaria incana is insect pollinated and is recorded to have been visited in northern Florida by Bombus fraternus, Bombus pensylvanicus,Ceratina , and Melissodes comptoides.
