= Melissodes apicatus =

Scientific classification
- Kingdom: Animalia
- Phylum: Arthropoda
- Class: Insecta
- Order: Hymenoptera
- Family: Apidae
- Genus: Melissodes
- Species: M. apicatus

Binomial name
- Melissodes apicatus Cockerell & Lovell, 1906

Species of long-horned bee

Melissodes apicatus, the pickerelweed longhorn bee, is a species of long horned bee in the family Apidae. It is most commonly found in the eastern United States and southeastern parts of Canada. This species is native to the eastern United States and the farthest westward well known colony was spotted in Illinois, though they have been seen as far as Minnesota and Ontario Canada. Being a part of the Eucerini tribe, this species' male has disproportionately long antennae. This species is a solitary bee, therefore, it does not create colonies or store honey, though some may form large aggregations with nests close to one another.

== Location and habitat ==
Melissodes apicatus is native to eastern parts of the United States and can be currently found in North Carolina, Indiana, Illinois, Pennsylvania, New York, Connecticut, Vermont, Wisconsin, and parts of Minnesota. This bee has also been recognized in the southeastern provinces of Canada, Ontario and Quebec. M. apicatus had been natively seen pollinating Pontederia. Males have also been spotted on Hydrocotyle, Melilotis and Stachys.
