= Melissodes desponsus =

Scientific classification
- Kingdom: Animalia
- Phylum: Arthropoda
- Class: Insecta
- Order: Hymenoptera
- Family: Apidae
- Genus: Melissodes
- Species: M. desponsus

Binomial name
- Melissodes desponsus Smith, 1854

Species of bee

Melissodes desponsus, the eastern thistle longhorn bee, is a species of long-horned bee in the family Apidae. The bees are active in mid-to-late-summer.

== Description ==
These ground-nesting, solitary bees have pale yellow thoraxes and black abdomens. Females are 12-13.5 mm and have distinctive orange scopae on their hind legs, although they are often covered with white Cirsium pollen. Males are 11-13.5 mm, have longer antennae and yellow clypei.

== Range ==
Melissodes desponsus is found across the northeastern quadrant of the United States, reaching into southern Canada.

== Habitat ==
Cirsium thistles are host plants of these bees.

== Conservation ==
This species does not have a widely documented conservation status, although it is listed as vulnerable or imperiled by several regional sources.

== Taxonomy ==
The species has several synonymous scientific names. The female of the species was described as M. desponsa and the male was described as M. nigripes in 1854 by Frederick Smith. Other synonyms include M. americana, M. daponsa and M. cnici.
