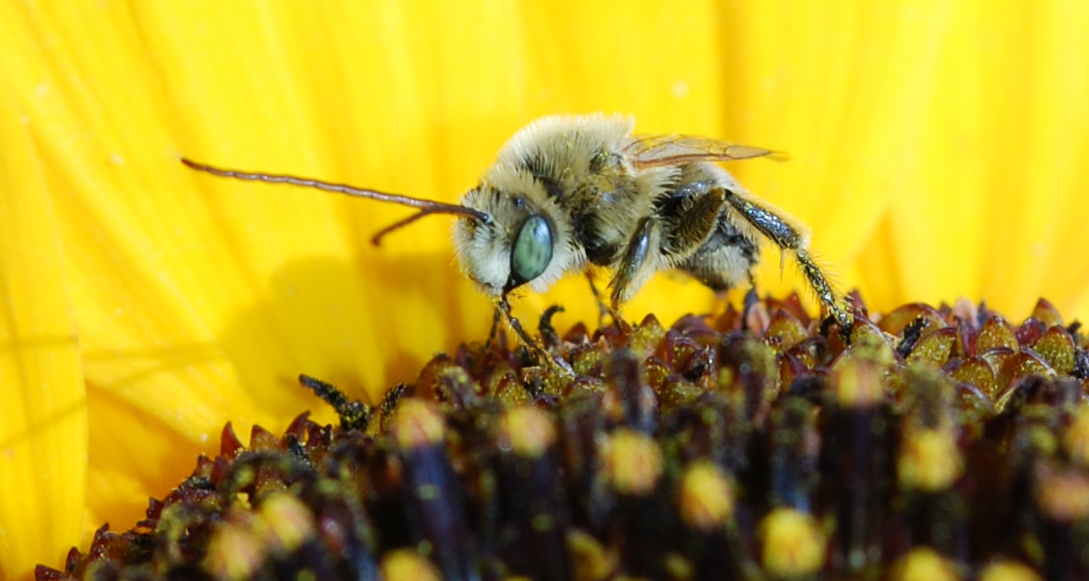

Scientific classification
- Kingdom: Animalia
- Phylum: Arthropoda
- Class: Insecta
- Order: Hymenoptera
- Family: Apidae
- Tribe: Eucerini
- Genus: Melissodes; Latreille, 1829

= Melissodes =

Genus of bees

Melissodes is the second largest genus of long-horned bees - named for the characteristically long antennae of males. Melissodes currently has 129 described species, all native to the Americas, from Canada in the North to Argentina in the South (though less common in the tropics).

The females of most species are either polylectic (collect pollen from a variety of plant species) or oligolectic (collect pollen from a narrow set of closely related plant species) on Asteraceae. Melissodes are important crop pollinators, particularly on sunflower, but they have also been observed on canola, cantaloupe, watermelon, cotton, coffee, and alfalfa.

== Taxonomy and phylogeny ==
Melissodes is a genus of insects in the tribe Eucerini (long-horned bees), believed to be sister to Svastra due to numerous uniting morphological features and increasing molecular evidence. As such, they are a member of the largest family of bees, Apidae, and the order Hymenoptera. Eight subgenera were originally recognized by Wallace E. LaBerge based on morphological characters: Eumelissodes, Melissodes s.s., Ecplectica, Tachymelissodes, Psilomelissodes, Heliomelissodes, Apomelissodes, and Callimelissodes.

== Description ==
Species in this genus are medium sized bees, usually with relatively dense, long hairs on the mesosoma/thorax and pale hair bands along the metasoma (although some species differ, as in Melissodes bimaculatus). Most species of males have exceptionally long antennae that extend well beyond the back of their head, like other long-horned bees. Melissodes can be difficult to distinguish from other related genera by morphological features alone; although a characteristic feature to bees in this genus are anteriorly narrowed tegulae. Species can be particularly difficult to distinguish from one another.

== Natural history ==
=== Life cycle and nesting behavior ===
Females are known to be both solitary and gregarious nesters. Aggregations can house thousands of individuals across hundreds of nest entrances. Melissodes aggregations have been most commonly observed in areas with sandy, exposed soil. Nests can either be composed of a burrow with a single cell, as in M. persimilis, or having a number of brood cells per burrow, as in M. agilis.

Males will generally emerge from the nests prior to females each year, which is common among bees that nest gregariously due to male competition dynamics. Males fly rather erratically and in many species sleep in aggregations on flowers, sometimes for years (across generations) in the same area.

Nesting sites of Melissodes are commonly parasitized by Triepeolus.

=== Foraging and pollen specialization ===
A diversity of pollen specialization is found in Melissodes. The most recent common ancestor of present-day Melissodes likely was a generalist, with Asteraceae pollen among the groups of plants they collected. While most oligolectic species specialize on Asteraceae, other plant families include Clarkia, as in M. clarkiae; Polemoniaceae, as in M. velutinus; and Pontederia, as in M. apicatus, among others. Melissodes agilis, a specialist on Asteraceae, collects pollen from sunflowers through a rapid abdominal tapping motion. This behavior was recently observed and likely occurs across other species of Melissodes, given a similar behavior observed in Svastra.

=== Habitat and distribution ===
Melissodes are found across North and South America. Specifically, species in the subgenera Melissodes s.s. and Ecplectica can be found across North and South America, while the remaining subgenera (Eumelissodes, Tachymelissodes, Psilomelissodes, Heliomelissodes, Apomelissodes, and Callimelissodes) are only found in present day North America. They are most commonly found in open and edge habitat (especially that of the western United States) with high floral abundance in areas with sandy and loamy soil. Melissodes are abundant in the fields of some crops and are likely very economically important for crop pollination, especially for sunflower (Helianthus annuus).

Aggregations of Melissodes are often found nearby areas of high floral availability (especially high floral abundance of host plants for pollen specialists). However, regions of high floral availability can vary year to year. This is especially true for pollen specialist species of crops (Asteraceae specialists in this group, mostly), since these crops will undergo rotation. This means that emerging females of each new generation must consistently travel far from their nest site to find pollen to provision for the next generation.

== See also ==
- List of Melissodes species
