= List of Eucera species =

This is a list of selected species within the genus Eucera. It does not include species from the former genera Tetraloniella, Peponapis, Syntrichalonia, Cemolobus, Xenoglossodes or Xenoglossa.

- Eucera acerba (Cresson, 1879)
- Eucera actuosa (Cresson, 1878)
- Eucera aequata Vachal, 1907
- Eucera afghana Tkalcu, 1978
- Eucera albescens (Timberlake, 1969)
- Eucera alborufa (Radoszkowski, 1872)
- Eucera alfkeni Risch, 2003
- Eucera algeriensis Dalla Torre, 1896
- Eucera algira Brullé, 1840
- Eucera alopex Risch, 1999
- Eucera alternans (Brullé, 1832)
- Eucera amoena (Zavortink, 1982)
- Eucera amsinckiae (Timberlake, 1969)
- Eucera andreui (Dusmet y Alonso, 1926)
- Eucera angustifrons (Timberlake, 1969)
- Eucera arachosiae Tkalcu, 1978
- Eucera aragalli (Cockerell, 1904)
- Eucera argyrophila (Cockerell, 1909)
- Eucera armeniaca (Morawitz, 1878)
- Eucera atrata Klug, 1845
- Eucera atricornis Fabricius, 1793
- Eucera atriventris (Smith, 1854)
- Eucera atroalba (Pérez, 1895)
- Eucera bakeri (Timberlake, 1973)
- Eucera barbiventris Pérez, 1902
- Eucera basizona (Spinola, 1839)
- Eucera belfragei (Cresson, 1872)
- Eucera bidentata Pérez, 1887
- Eucera birkmanniella (Cockerell, 1906)
- Eucera biscrensis (Alfken, 1933)
- Eucera brevitarsis Risch, 1997
- Eucera caerulescens Friese, 1899
- Eucera californica (Cresson, 1878)
- Eucera carinata (Timberlake, 1961)
- Eucera carolinensis Dalla Torre, 1896
- Eucera caspica Morawitz, 1873
- Eucera cassandra Nurse, 1904
- Eucera cercidis (Timberlake, 1969)
- Eucera chinensis (Smith, 1854)
- Eucera chrysobotryae (Cockerell, 1908)
- Eucera chrysophila (Cockerell, 1914)
- Eucera chrysopyga Pérez, 1879
- Eucera cineraria Eversmann, 1852
- Eucera cinerea Lepeletier, 1841
- Eucera cinnamomea Alfken, 1935
- Eucera clypeata Erichson, 1835
- Eucera codinai Dusmet y Alonso, 1926
- Eucera collaris Dours, 1873
- Eucera commixta Dalla Torre & Friese, 1895
- Eucera conditi (Timberlake, 1969)
- Eucera conformis (Timberlake, 1969)
- Eucera cordleyi (Viereck, 1905)
- Eucera cuniculina Klug, 1845
- Eucera curvitarsis Mocsáry, 1879
- Eucera cypria Alfken, 1933
- Eucera dalmatica Lepeletier, 1841
- Eucera deceptrix Smith, 1879
- Eucera decipiens Alfken, 1935
- Eucera decolorata Gribodo, 1924
- Eucera delphinii (Timberlake, 1969)
- Eucera diana Nurse, 1904
- Eucera digitata Friese, 1896
- Eucera dimidiata Brullé, 1832
- Eucera discoidalis Morawitz, 1878
- Eucera distincta Lepeletier, 1841
- Eucera distinguenda (Morawitz, 1875)
- Eucera dorsata (Timberlake, 1969)
- Eucera douglasiana (Cockerell, 1906)
- Eucera doursana Dalla Torre & Friese, 1894
- Eucera dubitata (Cresson, 1878)
- Eucera ebmeri Risch, 1999
- Eucera edwardsii (Cresson, 1878)
- Eucera elongatula Vachal, 1907
- Eucera eucnemidea Dours, 1873
- Eucera excisa Mocsáry, 1879
- Eucera fasciata Risch, 1999
- Eucera fasciatella Lepeletier, 1841
- Eucera fedtschenkoi Dalla Torre, 1896
- Eucera ferghanica Morawitz, 1875
- Eucera ferruginea Lepeletier, 1841
- Eucera flavicornis Risch, 2003
- Eucera floralia (Smith, 1854)
- Eucera frater (Cresson, 1878)
- Eucera friesei Risch, 2003
- Eucera fulvitarsis (Cresson, 1878)
- Eucera fulviventris (Smith, 1854)
- Eucera fulvohirta (Cresson, 1878)
- Eucera furfurea Vachal, 1907
- Eucera gaullei Vachal, 1907
- Eucera genovefae Vachal, 1907
- Eucera gracilipes Pérez, 1895
- Eucera graeca Radoszkowski, 1876
- Eucera grandis (Fonscolombe, 1846)
- Eucera hamata (Bradley, 1942)
- Eucera helvola Klug, 1845
- Eucera hermoni Risch, 2003
- Eucera hirsuta Morawitz, 1875
- Eucera hirsutissima (Cockerell, 1916)
- Eucera hispaliensis Pérez, 1902
- Eucera hispana Lepeletier, 1841
- Eucera hungarica Friese, 1896
- Eucera hurdi (Timberlake, 1969)
- Eucera ignota (Timberlake, 1969)
- Eucera illinoensis (Robertson, 1902)
- Eucera interrupta Bär, 1850
- Eucera jacoti (Cockerell, 1930)
- Eucera kilikiae Risch, 1999
- Eucera kullenbergi Tkalcu, 1978
- Eucera kyrenaica Friese, 1923
- Eucera lanata Sitdikov, 1988
- Eucera lanuginosa Klug, 1845
- Eucera latipes Risch, 1997
- Eucera laxiscopa Alfken, 1935
- Eucera lepida (Cresson, 1878)
- Eucera longicornis (Linnaeus, 1758)
- Eucera lucasi (Gribodo, 1893)
- Eucera lunata (Timberlake, 1969)
- Eucera lutziana (Cockerell, 1933)
- Eucera lycii (Cockerell, 1897)
- Eucera maroccana (Dusmet y Alonso, 1928)
- Eucera mastrucata (Morawitz, 1875)
- Eucera matalae Tkalcu, 2003
- Eucera mauritaniae Tkalcu, 1984
- Eucera maxima Tkalcu, 1987
- Eucera mediterranea Friese, 1896
- Eucera melanocephala Morawitz, 1875
- Eucera metallescens (Morawitz, 1888)
- Eucera microsoma Cockerell, 1922
- Eucera minulla Risch, 2003
- Eucera mohavensis (Timberlake, 1969)
- Eucera monozona (Timberlake, 1969)
- Eucera monticola Risch, 2003
- Eucera moricei Alfken, 1935
- Eucera nigrescens Pérez, 1879
- Eucera nigrifacies Lepeletier, 1841
- Eucera nigrilabris Lepeletier, 1841
- Eucera nigripes Klug, 1845
- Eucera nigrita Friese, 1895
- Eucera nipponensis (Pérez, 1911)
- Eucera nitidiventris Mocsáry, 1879
- Eucera notata Lepeletier, 1841
- Eucera numida Lepeletier, 1841
- Eucera obliterata Pérez, 1896
- Eucera occidentalis Risch, 1999
- Eucera oraniensis Lepeletier, 1841
- Eucera oreophila Risch, 2003
- Eucera pagosana (Cockerell, 1925)
- Eucera palaestinae Friese, 1922
- Eucera pallidihirta (Timberlake, 1969)
- Eucera pannonica Mocsáry, 1878
- Eucera paraclypeata Sitdikov, 1988
- Eucera parnassia Pérez, 1902
- Eucera pedata Dours, 1873
- Eucera pekingensis Yasumatsu, 1946
- Eucera penicillata Risch, 1997
- Eucera phaceliae (Cockerell, 1911)
- Eucera pici Vachal, 1907
- Eucera pitalomasa (Dover, 1925)
- Eucera polita Pérez, 1895
- Eucera pollinaris (Kirby, 1802)
- Eucera pomeranzevii (Morawitz, 1888)
- Eucera pomona Nurse, 1904
- Eucera popovi Sitdikov, 1988
- Eucera primiveris (Timberlake, 1969)
- Eucera pseudeucnemidea Risch, 1997
- Eucera pulveracea Dours, 1873
- Eucera punctatissima Pérez, 1895
- Eucera puncticollis Morawitz, 1876
- Eucera punctissima de Gaulle, 1908
- Eucera punctulata Alfken, 1942
- Eucera pusilla Morawitz, 1875
- Eucera pythagoras Risch, 2003
- Eucera quadricincta (Timberlake, 1969)
- Eucera quilisi (Dusmet y Alonso, 1926)
- Eucera rosae (Robertson, 1900)
- Eucera ruficollis (Brullé, 1832)
- Eucera rufipes Smith, 1879
- Eucera salamita Vachal, 1907
- Eucera seminuda Brullé, 1832
- Eucera serraticornis Risch, 1999
- Eucera sociabilis Smith, 1873
- Eucera sogdiana Morawitz, 1875
- Eucera spatulata Gribodo, 1893
- Eucera speciosa (Cresson, 1878)
- Eucera spectabilis (Morawitz, 1875)
- Eucera speculifer Pérez, 1911
- Eucera spinipes Risch, 2003
- Eucera spurcatipes Pérez, 1911
- Eucera squamosa Lepeletier, 1841
- Eucera stretchii (Cresson, 1878)
- Eucera suavis (Cresson, 1878)
- Eucera subrufa Lepeletier, 1841
- Eucera syriaca Dalla Torre, 1896
- Eucera taurica Morawitz, 1871
- Eucera tegularis Morawitz, 1875
- Eucera territella (Cockerell, 1909)
- Eucera texana (Timberlake, 1969)
- Eucera thoracica Spinola, 1839
- Eucera tibialis Morawitz, 1875
- Eucera transitoria (Morawitz, 1875)
- Eucera tricincta Erichson, 1835
- Eucera tricinctella (Timberlake, 1969)
- Eucera troglodytes Risch, 2003
- Eucera truttae (Cockerell, 1905)
- Eucera tuberculata (Fabricius, 1793)
- Eucera turcomannica (Morawitz, 1880)
- Eucera vachali Pérez, 1895
- Eucera velutina (Morawitz, 1873)
- Eucera venusta (Timberlake, 1961)
- Eucera vernalis (Morawitz, 1875)
- Eucera vicina (Morawitz, 1876)
- Eucera vidua Lepeletier, 1841
- Eucera virgata (Cockerell, 1905)
- Eucera vittulata Noskiewicz, 1934
- Eucera vulpes Brullé, 1832
- Eucera warnckei Risch, 1999
- Eucera yunnanensis (Wu, 2000)
- Eucera zeta Dalla Torre, 1896
- Eucera zonata (Timberlake, 1969)
