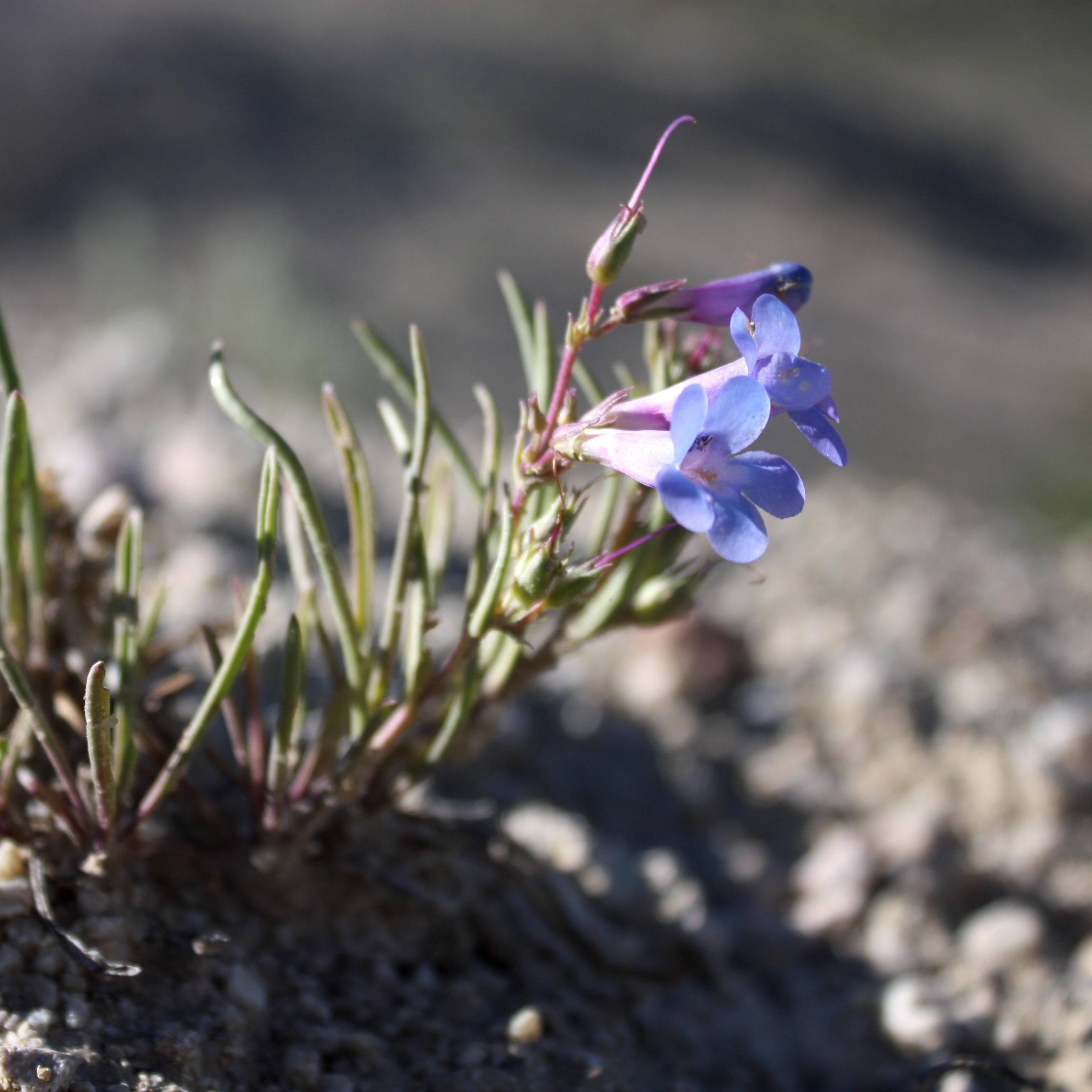
- Side view of a small plant

Conservation status
- Critically Imperiled (NatureServe)

Scientific classification
- Kingdom: Plantae
- Clade: Embryophytes
- Clade: Tracheophytes
- Clade: Spermatophytes
- Clade: Angiosperms
- Clade: Eudicots
- Clade: Asterids
- Order: Lamiales
- Family: Plantaginaceae
- Genus: Penstemon
- Species: P. penlandii

Binomial name
- Penstemon penlandii W.A.Weber

= Penstemon penlandii =

Coloradan plant species in the veronica family

Penstemon penlandii is a rare species of flowering plant in the plantain family known by the common names Penland penstemon and Penland beardtongue. It is endemic to Colorado, United States, where it is known only from a strip of land of approximately twelve square kilometers (4.6 sq mi) in central Grand County. It is a federally listed endangered species of the United States.

The first recorded observances of P. penlandii were in the 1980s during surveys for Osterhout milkvetch, another rare local endemic. The two plants are found only in Middle Park, a valley with seleniferous badlands that host a unique flora. The penstemon grows in clay that is rich in selenium, an element toxic to most other plants in high concentrations. In adjacent stretches of land that have a lower selenium content the penstemon population becomes thinner and it is replaced by sagebrush. The penstemon grows in the shade of the banks of runoff channels that are periodically flooded; the plant's deep, ropelike roots and rhizome anchor it to underground shale deposits to prevent it from being torn away during floods.

== Description ==
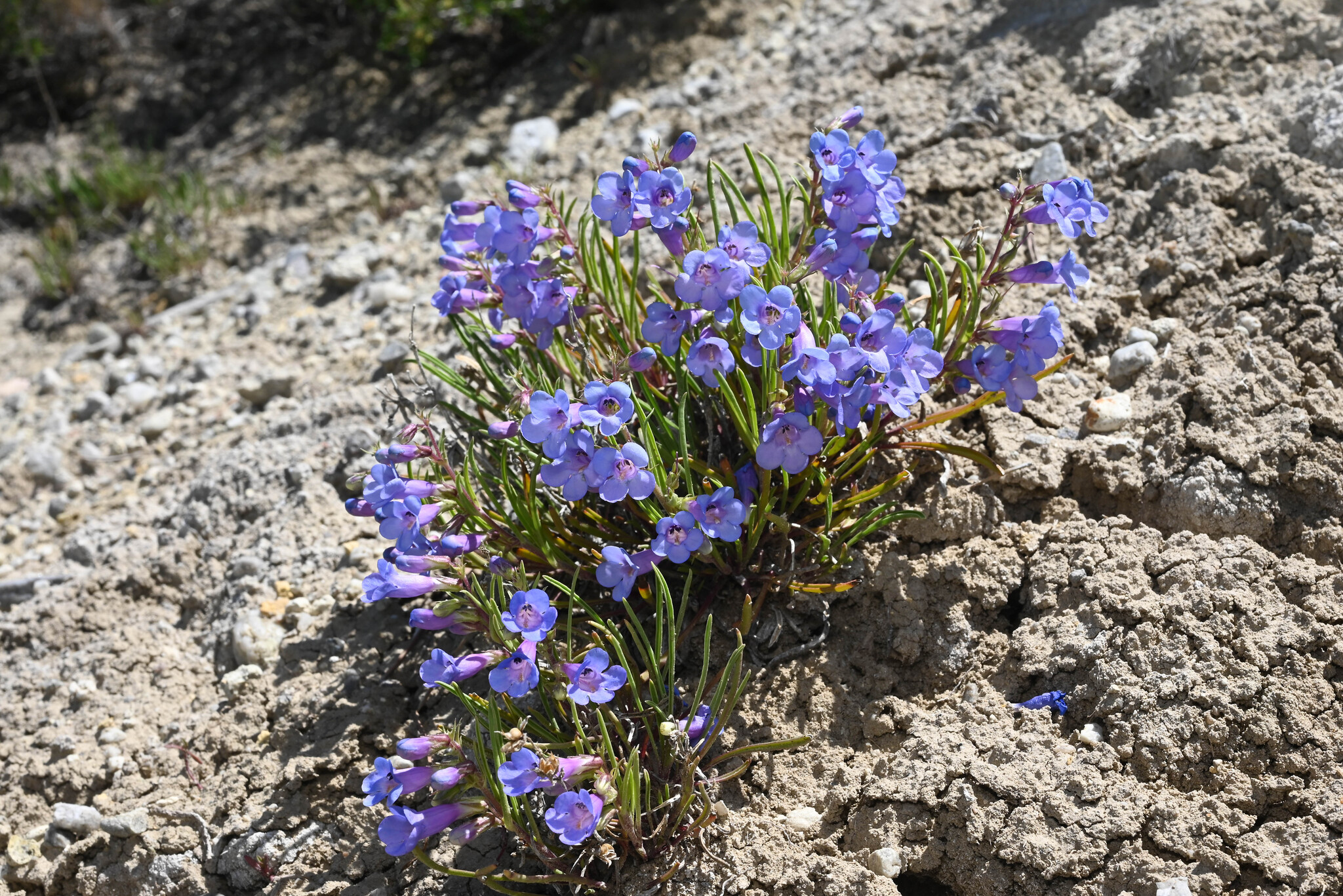
Blooming plant in June 2025

Penstemon penlandii is a perennial herb which from a woody caudex attached to the thick root system. The flowering stems are 7 to 25 centimeters (3–10 in) tall and densely covered with hairs that can be rough and backwards pointing. The small, linear leaves are attached to both the base of the plant and to the flowering stems. The lowest leaves on the stems and the basal leaves measure 1.5–8 cm long, but just 0.8–2 millimeters in width. Flowering stems will have one to three pairs of leaves attached to opposite sides of the stem, upper ones measure 1–7.5 cm long and just 0.5–1.5 mm wide. The leaves are folded lengthwise or have edges that roll inwards, but the edges have no teeth or lobes.

The inflorescence on a Penstemon penlandii contains up to 30 flowers in colors ranging from purple to blue, with each flower measuring 1.3–1.6 centimeters long. The inflorescence measures 3–10 cm long and is a thyrse, a flowering stem that grows indeterminately, but the branches with the flowers do not. The flowers on the inflorescence are in two to six tightly packed groups with all the blooms facing the same direction away from the stem. The groups of flowers have two attachment points, usually with one or two flowers, but occasionally as many as four. Each group has a nearby pair of bracts that can be as much as 1–5.5 cm long.

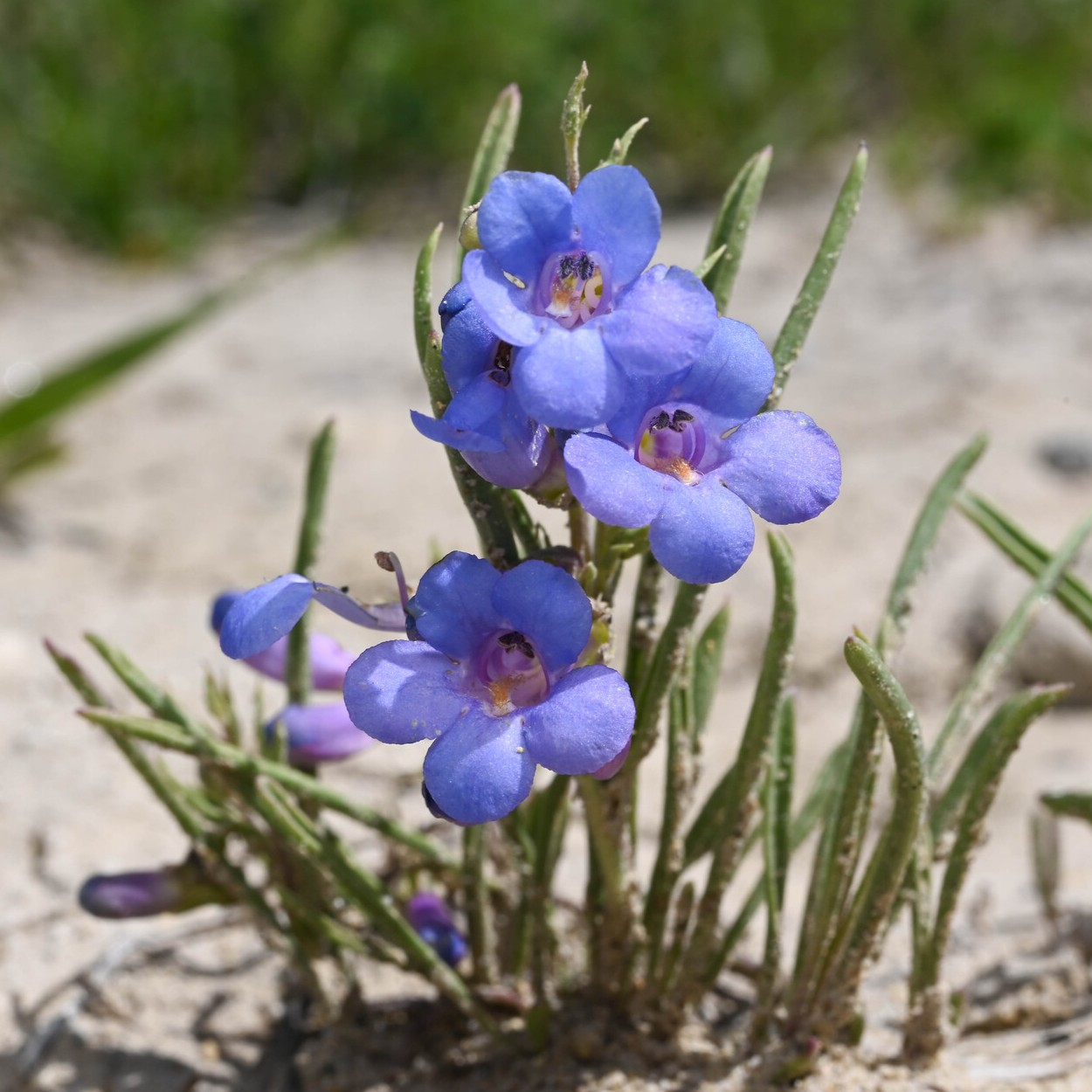
Flowers, June 2025

The flowers are funnel shaped, getting gradually wider towards the mouth of the flower. They are only somewhat two-lipped, with the five lobes of the flower about as wide as they are long. The flowers are also hairless both internally and externally with red-purple floral guide lines. The stamens and staminode do not extend out of the flower's mouth with the staminode reaching 8–9 mm in length with a dense covering of yellow-orange hairs towards the tip. When the flowers first open they are blue-violet, but older blooms are pinkish-blue. Flowers typically last three days with the corolla, the united tube of the petals, falling off on the fourth day. Blooming occurs in June or July.

The fruit is a capsule that usually measures 6–9 mm long, only occasionally reaching 14 mm, and 4–6 mm wide. The plants are partly self-compatible, but for more efficient fruit production the flowers must be visited by pollinators. Many species of bees, especially of genus Osmia, pollinate the flowers, as does Pseudomasaris vespoides, a pollen wasp that specializes in collecting from penstemons.

== Taxonomy ==
Penstemon penlandii was scientifically described by the American botanist William Alfred Weber in 1986. It is part of the Penstemon genus which is classified in the family Plantaginaceae. Historically, the species and its genus were classified within the figwort family. Weber thought that it was most closely related to an endemic species from southwestern Wyoming, Penstemon paysoniorum. It was observed by David L. Johnson during a survey for a relocation of a power line who alerted Weber. Two weeks later, Weber collected the type specimen on 30 July 1986.

=== Names ===
Both its scientific name of penlandii and the common names Penland's penstemon, Penland penstemon, Penland's beardtongue, and Penland beardtongue, reference the botanist C. William T. Penland who had died in 1982. In the explanation of the name Weber mentioned that Penland had written the description of the genus Penstemon for Harold Harrington's Flora of Colorado. Related to its native distribution, it is also known as Kremmling beardtongue.

== Distribution ==
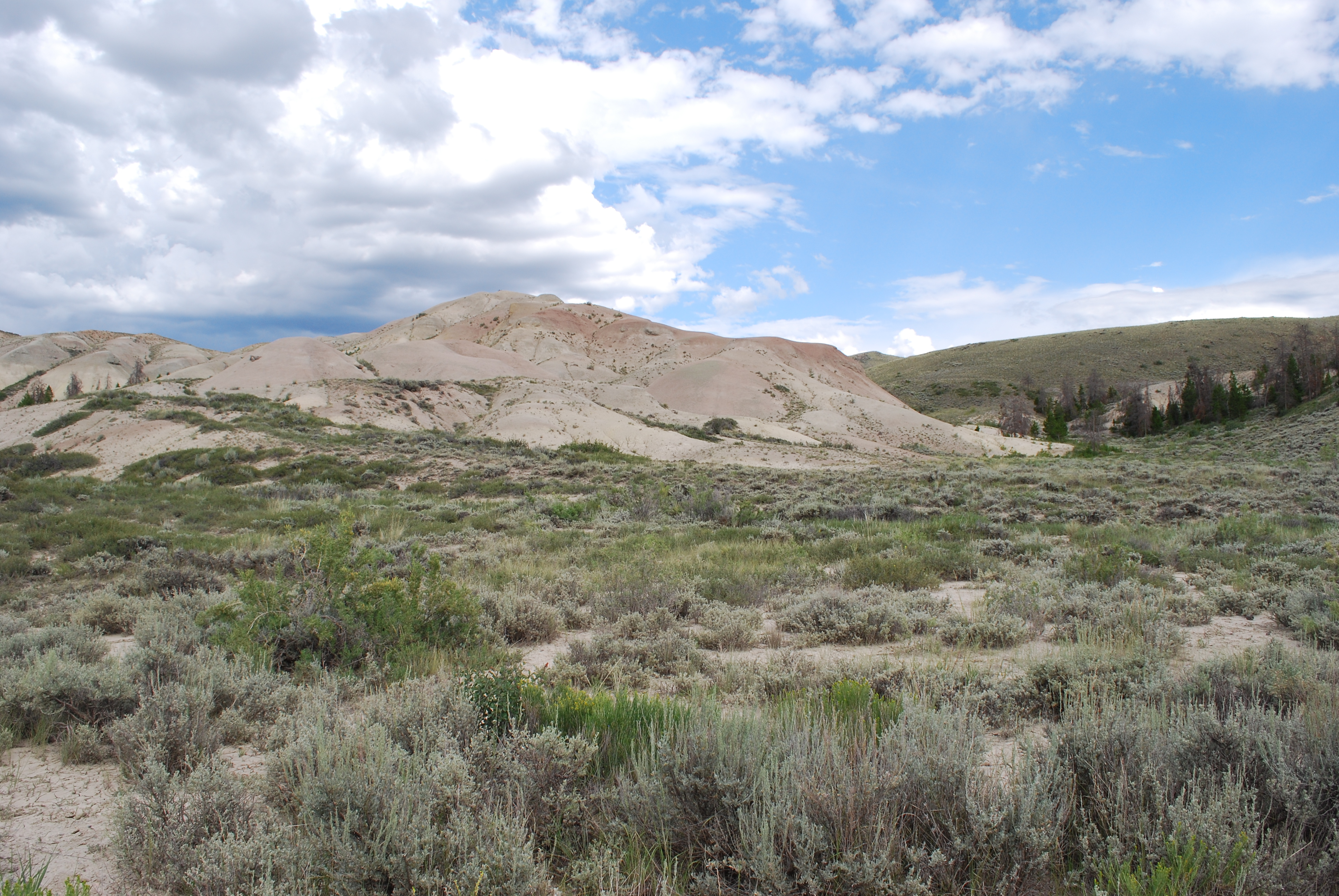
Barren, moon-like habitat of the Troublesome Formation

Penstemon penlandii is endemic to a single area in the Middle Park basin in Colorado. In 1992, the species's range was measured as all within a total area of 6 km^{2} (2.3 mi^{2}) within Grand County. These populations of P. penlandii were concentrated along dirt roadsides approximately 16 km (9.9 mi) from the city of Kremmling. Occurrences have been observed on both privately owned land and land administered by the Bureau of Land Management. As of 2026, the range of P. penlandii is about 12 km^{2} (4.6 mi^{2}) total across two occurrences.

The species is locally abundant growing from the Troublesome Formation's seleniferous shale soil. The range of P. penlandii is dominated by shrubs and grasses.

== Ecology ==
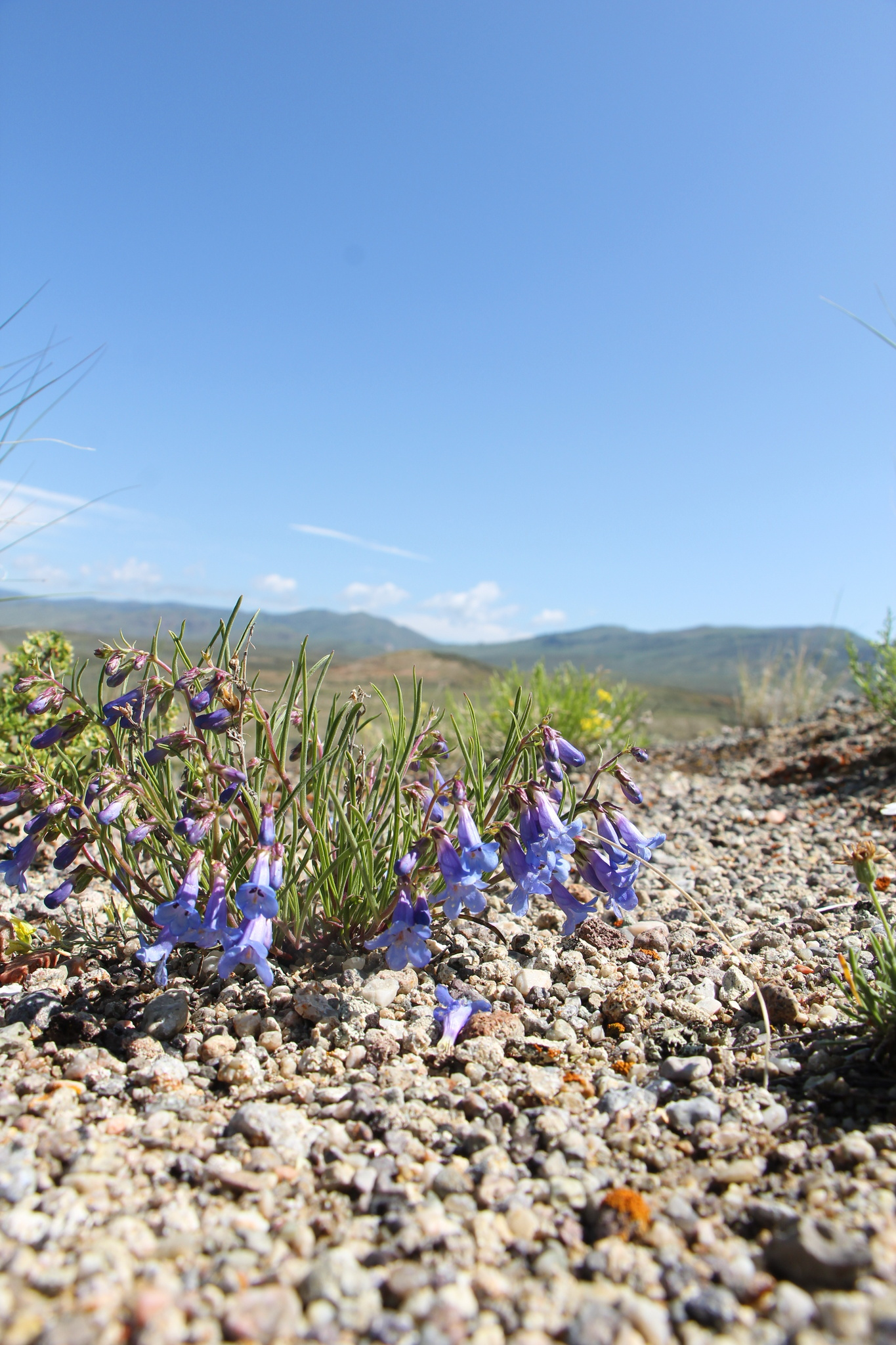
Plant growing atop a low rise

Like other endangered plant species, P. penlandii has lower rates of disease than related species. In a survey of herbarium specimens, none were found with fungal infections whereas pineleaf penstemon (Penstemon pinifolius) specimens were found with one.

Though P. penlandii flowers are fertile with their own pollen, the style is usually held against the upper surface of the flower tube on the first day of blooming and only moves downward on the second or third day. The pollen is released from the anthers on the first day of blooming, the first two opening in the morning from 9:00 to 9:30 and the second pair opening later in the morning or early in the afternoon. A diverse range of bees visit the flowers including two species of bumblebee (Bombus), the bumblebee mimic Anthophora bomboides, two species of small carpenter bee (Ceratina), the long-horned bee Eucera fulvitarsis, and at least 14 species of mason bee (Osmia). Many of these species will visit the flowers one year and not the next. Smaller bees, under 6 mm in length, often do not carry pollen when visiting the flowers suggesting they are not efficient pollinators. The flowers are also visited by flies, beetles, and butterflies, but they also have not been found to carry pollen for the plants.

The seeds of P. penlandii germinate at very low rates unless they are mechanically scarified. This causes the seeds to persist as a soil seed bank for many years after being released from the seed capsules. Once scarified, seeds sprout most readily at temperatures of 15–30 °C (59–86 °F), however in experiments above 25 °C (77 °F) infection by funguses occurred.

=== Conservation ===
Penstemon penlandii is listed as a federally listed endangered species of the United States. It was listed in 1989 at the same time as Astragalus osterhoutii, another endangered plant species native to the area. This protection makes it illegal to collect or distribute any portion of a plant of this species – whether it is found in the wild or in cultivation – without the applicable federal permit. It is one of three penstemon species given Endangered Species Act protections alongside the Parachute penstemon (Penstemon debilis) and the blowout penstemon (Penstemon haydenii). As of 2026, P. penlandii has a NatureServe conservation status of critically imperiled.
