= Eucera cordleyi =

Scientific classification
- Domain: Eukaryota
- Kingdom: Animalia
- Phylum: Arthropoda
- Class: Insecta
- Order: Hymenoptera
- Family: Apidae
- Tribe: Eucerini
- Genus: Eucera
- Species: E. cordleyi

Binomial name
- Eucera cordleyi (Viereck, 1905)

Species of bee

Eucera cordleyi is a species of long-horned bee in the family Apidae. It is found in North America.
