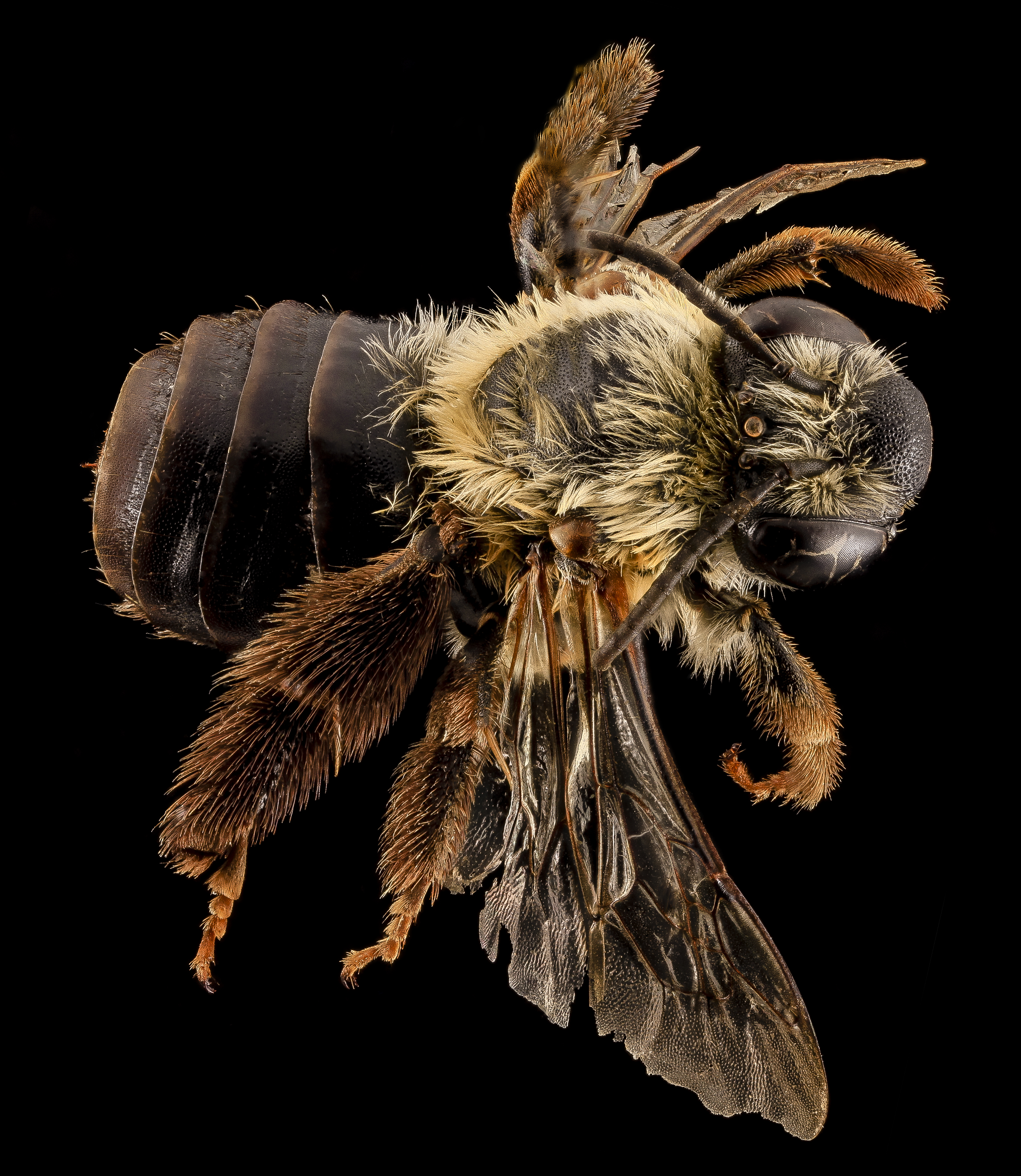

Scientific classification
- Domain: Eukaryota
- Kingdom: Animalia
- Phylum: Arthropoda
- Class: Insecta
- Order: Hymenoptera
- Family: Apidae
- Tribe: Eucerini
- Genus: Eucera
- Species: E. rosae

Binomial name
- Eucera rosae (Robertson, 1900)

= Eucera rosae =

Species of bee

Eucera rosae is a species of long-horned bee in the family Apidae. It is found in North America.
