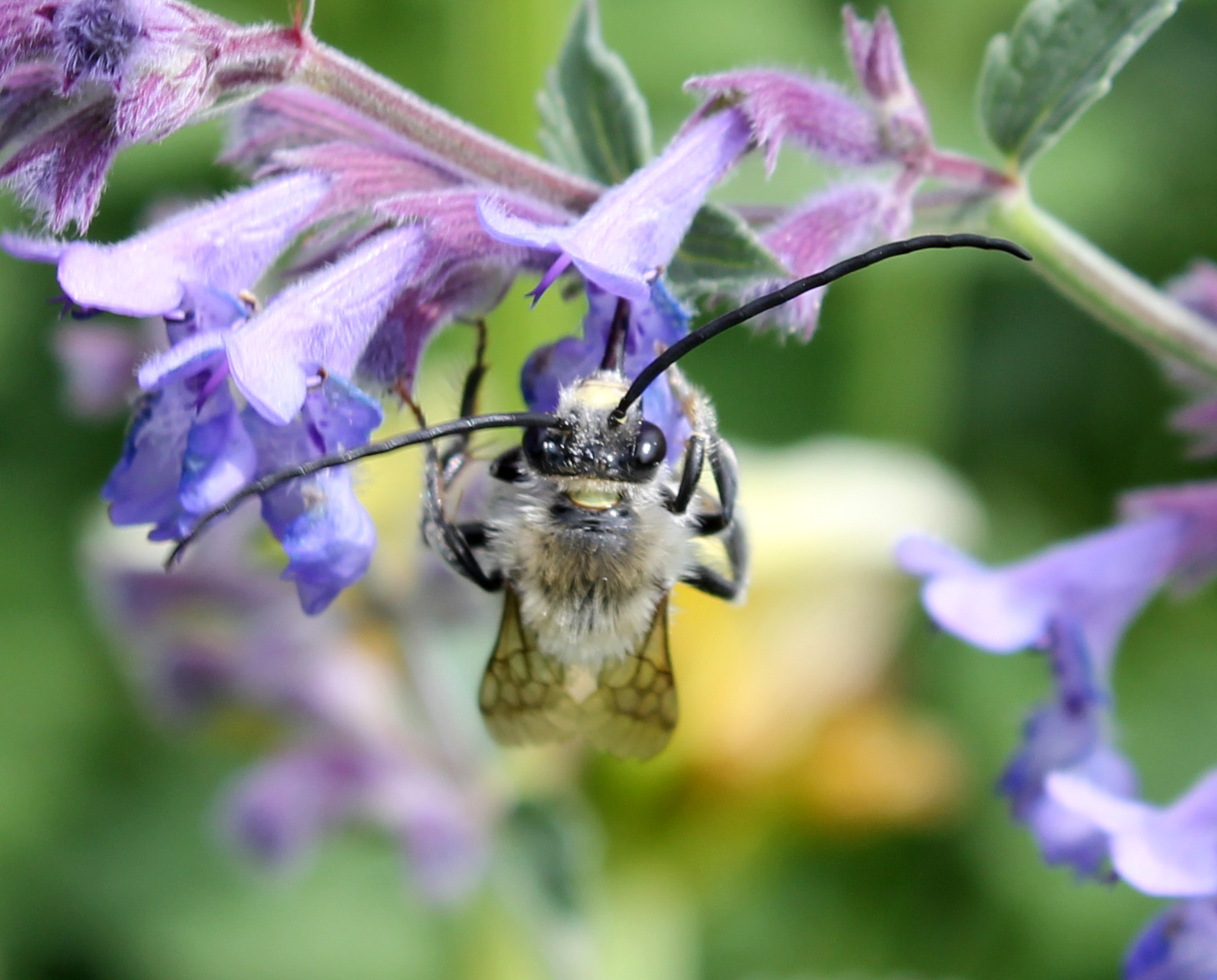

Scientific classification
- Kingdom: Animalia
- Phylum: Arthropoda
- Clade: Pancrustacea
- Class: Insecta
- Order: Hymenoptera
- Family: Apidae
- Genus: Eucera
- Species: E. longicornis

Binomial name
- Eucera longicornis (Linnaeus, 1758)

Synonyms
- Eucera tuberculata Fabricius, 1793; Eucera difficilis Dufour, Friese & Perez, 1896; Eucera atricollis Friese, 1922

= Eucera longicornis =

Species of bee

Eucera longicornis is a species of bee in the family Apidae, subfamily Apinae, and tribe Eucerini, the long-horned bees.

== Description ==
The head, thorax and abdomen of this species are black, the thorax being clad in pale brown, downy hairs on its upper surface, graduating to yellowish down on the sides and pale grey down underneath. In the male, the clypeus and labrum are yellow, and the antennae are very long, being as long as the head and body combined. The female's antennae are shorter.

== Distribution and habitat ==
Foraging behavior of Eucera longicornis (male) and Bombus pascuorum in Norway

This bee occurs in the Palearctic realm, ranging from Western Europe to as far east as Siberia and China. In Britain it is patchily distributed in southern England and Wales. In favoured locations it can be quite numerous and tends to nest in aggregations. It typically is present near the coast in bare areas and short turf, in open grassy areas in woodland and sometimes on heathlands.

== Ecology ==
The adult female prepares a burrow, usually in clay soil, kneading the walls to make them smooth. The nest is provisioned with a mixture of pollen and honey made into a paste and an egg is laid on this. The larva feeds on the paste when it hatches. The winter is usually spent as a pre-pupa in the burrow, pupating the following spring and emerging from the burrow as an adult soon thereafter. On leaving the burrow, the male passes its long antennae through a notch on the tarsus (first leg segment), by which means any adhering membranes are scraped off. However some individuals may pass the winter in the adult state. The bees are on the wing between May and July. In the Mediterranean region, the male is a pollinator of the bee orchid Ophrys apifera. Research on long-horned bees shows that species feeding on flowers with hidden pollen have evolved and diversified more quickly than those using easily accessible pollen.
