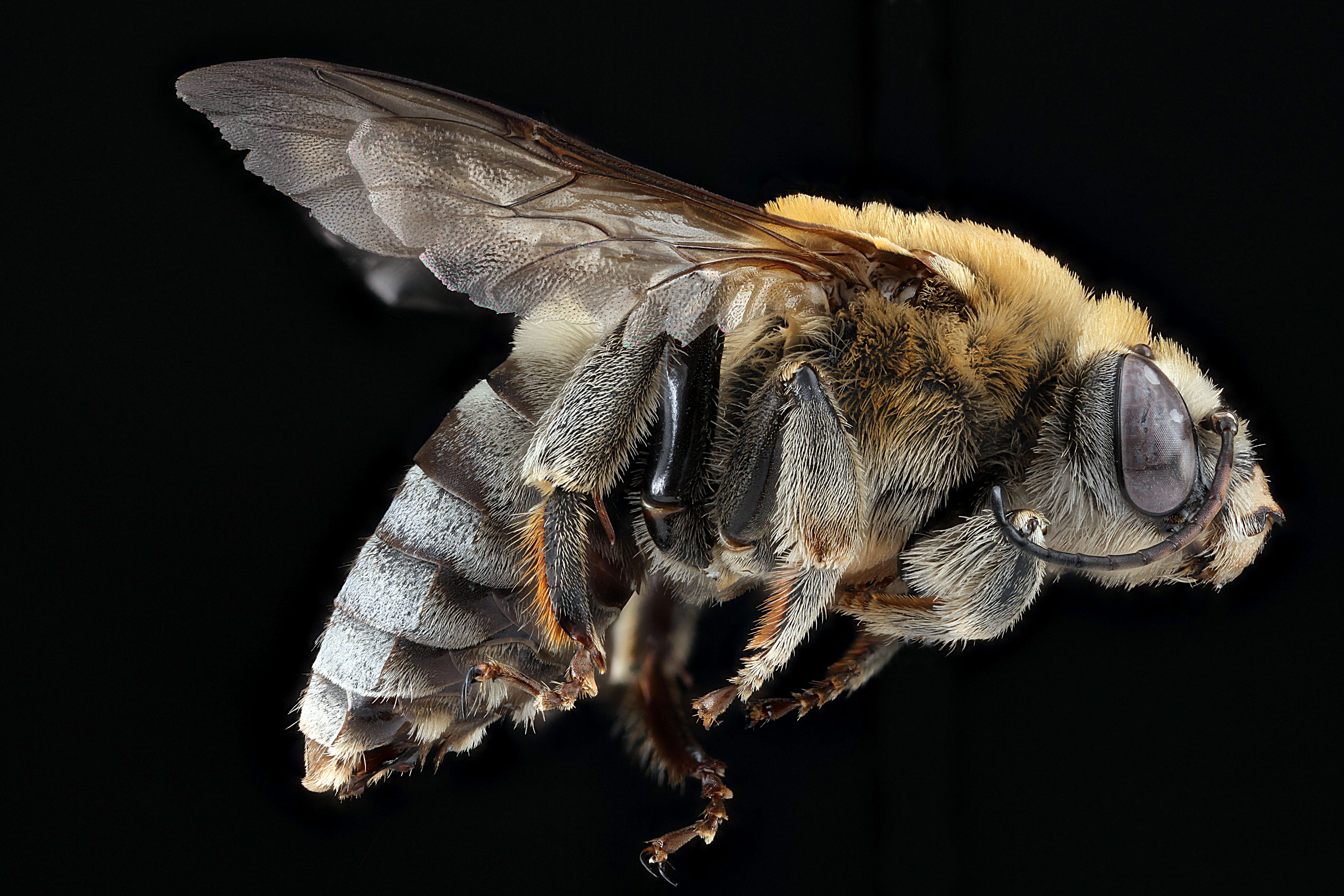
- Eucera (Cemolobus) ipomoeae

Scientific classification
- Kingdom: Animalia
- Phylum: Arthropoda
- Clade: Pancrustacea
- Class: Insecta
- Order: Hymenoptera
- Family: Apidae
- Tribe: Eucerini
- Genus: Eucera; Robertson, 1902
- Species: E. ipomoeae

Binomial name
- Eucera ipomoeae (Robertson, 1891)

= Cemolobus =

Genus of bees

Eucera (Cemolobus) ipomoeae was historically treated as a monotypic genus of long-horned bees in the family Apidae, but was recently included in the genus Eucera. There is one described species in the subgenus, C. ipomoeae, an oligolectic pollinator of morning glories. The historical range was considered to be primarily New England and the Upper Midwestern United States, but has been collected in Colorado and Mississippi in recent years, expanding its known range considerably.
