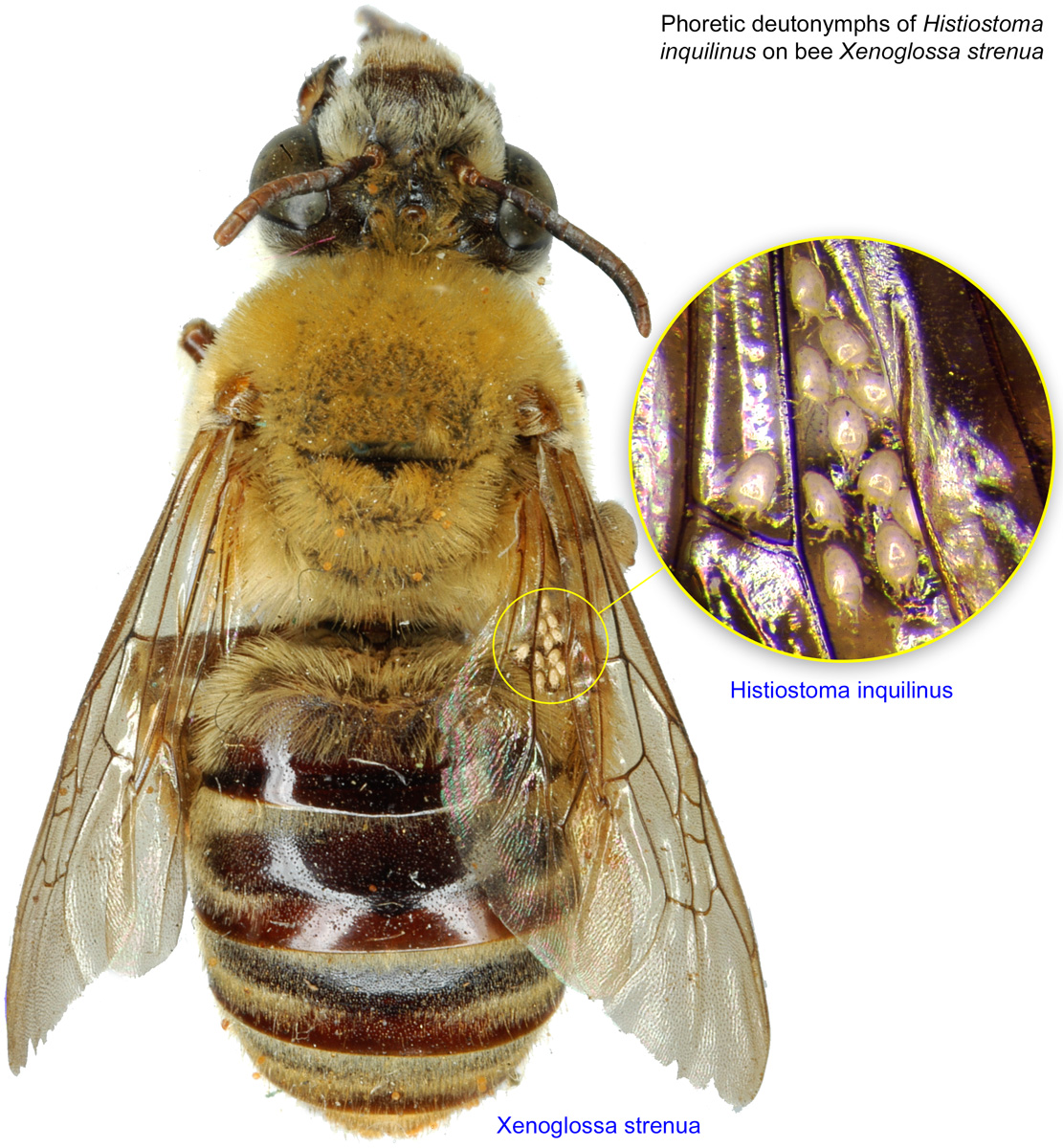

Scientific classification
- Domain: Eukaryota
- Kingdom: Animalia
- Phylum: Arthropoda
- Class: Insecta
- Order: Hymenoptera
- Family: Apidae
- Genus: Xenoglossa
- Species: X. strenua

Binomial name
- Xenoglossa strenua (Cresson, 1878)

= Xenoglossa strenua =

Species of bee

Xenoglossa strenua is a species of long-horned bee in the family Apidae. It is found in Central America and North America.
