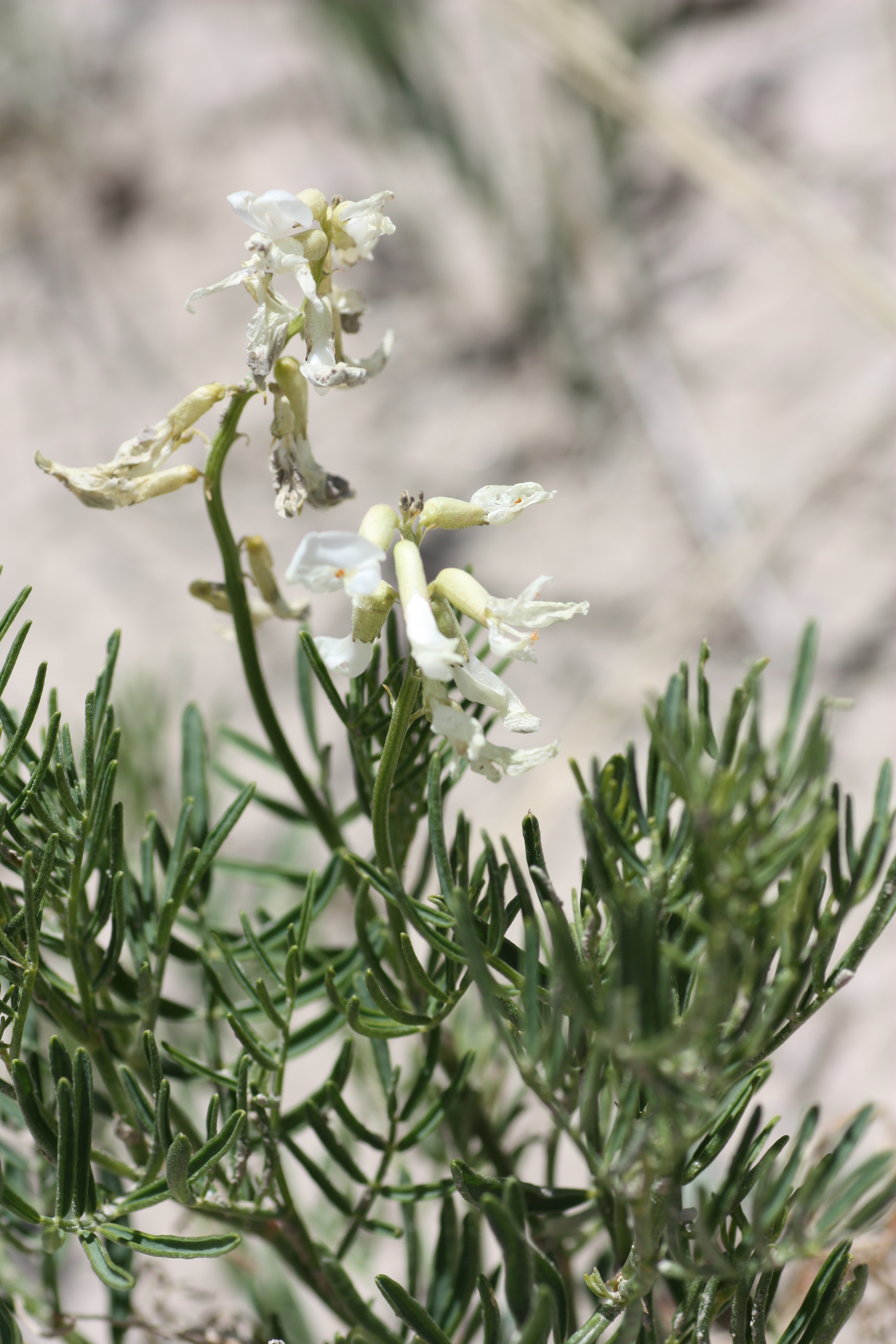
- Osterhout milkvetch

Conservation status
- Endangered (ESA)

- Imperiled (NatureServe)

Scientific classification
- Kingdom: Plantae
- Clade: Embryophytes
- Clade: Tracheophytes
- Clade: Spermatophytes
- Clade: Angiosperms
- Clade: Eudicots
- Clade: Rosids
- Order: Fabales
- Family: Fabaceae
- Subfamily: Faboideae
- Genus: Astragalus
- Species: A. osterhoutii

Binomial name
- Astragalus osterhoutii M.E.Jones

= Astragalus osterhoutii =

Species of astragalus

Astragalus osterhoutii, or the Osterhout milkvetch or Kremmling milkvetch, is an endangered species of milkvetch, discovered and collected in 1905 at Sulfur Spring in Grand County Colorado by Colorado botanist George Everett Osterhout for which the plant was named. It is found in the U.S. state of Colorado, in a 13 kilometres (8.1 mi) radius near the town of Kremmling.

The Osterhout milkvetch is a perennial dicot. It belongs to the pea family, Fabaceae, and is in the Astragalus L. genus.

Conservation efforts are centered around maintaining the populations and habitat due to the limited population numbers and limited range.

== Description ==
The Osterhout milkvetch is a herbaceous, or non-woody, plant belonging to the pea family. It has several bright green, slender, erect stems that range from 30.48–100 cm (12–40 in) tall. It has narrow linear leaflets that are approximately 3.81 cm (1.5 in) long. In the summer, the plant produces twelve to twenty-five white flowers that are 2.4 cm (1 in) long, with stipes ending in hanging pods that are 4.5 cm (1.8 in) long. The flowers are used to attract various pollinators. The plant also produces green fruits that turn maroon in the fall. Osterhout milkvetch may be mistaken for similar species Astragalus pattersonii and Astragalus bisulcatus. All of these plants share an overlapping habitat. All three plants also have a tall growth form. The Osterhout milkvetch can be distinguished from A. pattersonii by its long flattened hanging fruit. It can be distinguished from A. bisulcatus by its large white flowers. Osterhout milkvetch differs from both these species by its lime-green linear leaflets.

== Life history ==
The Osterhout milkvetch reproduces through seeds made viable through outcrossing and self-pollination. Higher fruit is usually set by self-pollination. The seeds go dormant and need to undergo scarification to germinate. Like other plants in the Astragalus genus, the Osterhout milkvetch experiences low fecundity. Many of its populations are small and highly restricted.

=== Diet ===
As a plant, Osterhout milkvetch relies on photosynthesis. Like other species in the Astragalus L. species, Osterhout milkvetch can enter a symbiotic relationship with Rhizobium bacteria which is a dinitrogen fixer. It also accumulates selenium in its leaves from the environment and can cause selenium poisoning in grazing animals.

=== Behavior ===
Primary pollinators of the Osterhout milkvetch include honey bees (Apis mellifera), bumblebees (Bombus sp.), and mason bees (Osmia sp.). Pollination occurs when the plant flowers in the summer.

=== Habitat ===
The Osterhout milkvetch grows on the Niobrara, Pierre, and Troublesome formations. It grows on shaley slopes at elevations ranging from 2,26 - 2,408 m (7,400-7,900 ft) above sea level. These slopes have grayish-brown clay with high concentration of selenium. The Osterhout milkvetch is able to concentrate selenium in its leaves. Due to this quality, the plant has an economic significance of indicating selenium. High selenium concentrations can cause problems with wildlife reproduction. Selenium can also cause severe problems for human health. The plant emits a pungent garlic or sulfur sent from the selenium. The region is classified as chaparral or shrubland habitat. This region includes plants such as big sagebrush (Artemisia tridentata), yellow rabbitbrush (Chrysothamnus viscidiflorus), broom snakeweed (Gutierrezia sarothrae), winterfat (Krascheninnikovia lanata), spiny phlox (Phlox hoodii), short-stem buckwheat (Eriogonum brevicaule), and western wheatgrass (Pascopyrum smithii). Average precipitation is 25–40 cm (10–16 in) per year.

=== Range ===
The Osterhout milkvetch is only found in a small area in Middle Park Colorado, near the town of Kremmling. In total, the plant has five small, scattered populations within a 13 km (8 mi) radius. It occupies an estimated total of 800 acres of habitat. Approximately 33% of the known populations occur on private land. For range map, see ECOS website.

== Conservation ==
=== Population size ===
In 1988 there were an estimated 25,000 to 50,000 individuals in the Osterhout milkvetch species gathered from six documented occurrences. There are currently an estimated 11,435 individuals in the Osterhout milkvetch species. This current number was gathered from five occurrences, the sixth occurrence of this species has not been seen in over twenty years.

=== Past and current geographical distribution ===
In 1988 there were six documented populations of Osterhout milkvetch within a 24.14 km (15 mi) radius. In 1995, one of these populations and a large part of its range was lost with the filling of a new reservoir on the Muddy Creek. Currently, there are five populations that occupy a 13 km (8 mi) radius with an estimated 3.42 square km (800 acres) of habitat near the town of Kremmling.

=== Major threats ===
Many of the threats to the Osterhout milkvetch come from human interaction. These include commercial, residential, and agricultural property development. New utility installations, access roads, off-highway vehicle recreation also pose a threat. The habitat is also threatened by reservoir operations and expansion, oil and gas drilling, and livestock grazing. Loss of habitat occurred with the construction of the Wolford Dam. Habitat was also lost with the filling of the new reservoir on the Muddy Creek. This development has also led to a loss of pollinators, further threatening the species. Both blister beetles (Meloidae), and larval bruchid beetles (Callosobruchus maculatus) feed on the plant. Blister beetles are found along Muddy Creek and feed on the flowers. The larval burchine beetles feed on the seeds of the Osterhout milkvetch. Invasive plants not native to the area and climate change also pose a threat.

=== Listing under the ESA ===
The Osterhout milkvetch was first proposed to be listed as an endangered species in 1988. It was ruled to be an endangered species in 1989. This ruling came after concerns about proposed development of the Muddy Creek Reservoir. Concerns about the development of the reservoir included placing a dam, recreational use, mining, and geographically isolated populations. There were also concerns about the limited range, and small population. When it was designated as endangered, it received a recovery priority number of 5C due to the high threat, conflict with development, and low recovery potential. The NatureServe global status gave the Osterhout milkvetch the status of G1/S1, meaning it is imperiled globally and statewide, due to its rarity which makes it vulnerable to extinction.

=== 5-year review ===
The 2014 review continued to list the species as endangered. During the 2016 review, the species kept its status as endangered due to a lack of available information and an ongoing effort to clarify recovery criteria for the species. It will be reevaluated with a Species Status Assessment and five-year review in 2022. The recovery criteria is expected to be clarified FY19. An updated recovery plan is expected in 2024.

=== Species status assessment ===
There is currently no Species Status Assessment available for the Osterhout milkvetch.

=== Recovery plan ===
==== 1992 Recovery Plan ====
The 1992 Recovery Plan aimed for the “conservation of existing populations for the foreseeable future”. The species will not be able to be delisted to the number of threats, limited habitat, and small populations.

There were three criteria set to preserve the species and maintain its habitat: 1) Making habitat management programs for all known populations of the Osterhout milkvetch. 2) Protecting the species from environmental impacts. This can be fulfilled in two ways. The first is the informal and formal consultation responsibilities under section 7. The second is through protection regulations under section 9 of ESA. 3) Identifying and maintaining the smallest possible viable populations of the plant.

The 1992 Recovery Plan also had three main priorities: 1) Action has to be taken to prevent extinction of irreversible decline in the foreseeable future. 2) To prevent decline in population and habitat quality or any other large negative impact short of extinction. 3) All other actions needed to meet the recovery objective.

There were several recovery tasks set: 1) To inventory any remaining potential habitat. 2) To protect existing habitats. Protecting existing habitat is done by ranking the habitats and protecting habitats on both private and federal land. Protecting federal land needs a coordinated research management. Areas of crucial environmental concern need to be established. "No surface occupancy" is necessary for activities that cause surface disturbances. This includes oil and gas drilling, and a review of mining claims. There needs to be a designation of off-road vehicle areas. On private lands, there needs to be an establishment of state natural resource areas. 3) To protect pollinators and their habitats. 4) To conduct more life history and ecology studies on the plant. This includes soil analysis, plant community analysis and characterization. It also includes population biology studies and monitoring populations. Additionally, it includes developing propagation and transportation protocols. Future actions are still to be decided.

The critical habitat is the 13 km (8 mi) radius near the town of Kremmling where the Osterhout milkvetch is found.

==== 2019 Recovery Plan ====
The 2019 Recovery Plan kept the same criteria from the 1992 Recovery Plan, but clarified it more. The first clarification was the population based recovery data, C-1. The population has to be kept stable or be increasing in the current range of the Osterhout milkvetch. This trend has to be seen over a ten year period. The trends must also have 90 percent confidence that density estimates are within 10 perfect of estimated true value. Data from before this clarification can’t be used. The second clarification was in the threats and management based criteria, T-1.The federal land the Osterhout milkvetch is found on must continue resource management plants, conservation agreements, recreation agreements, and/or travel management plants.
