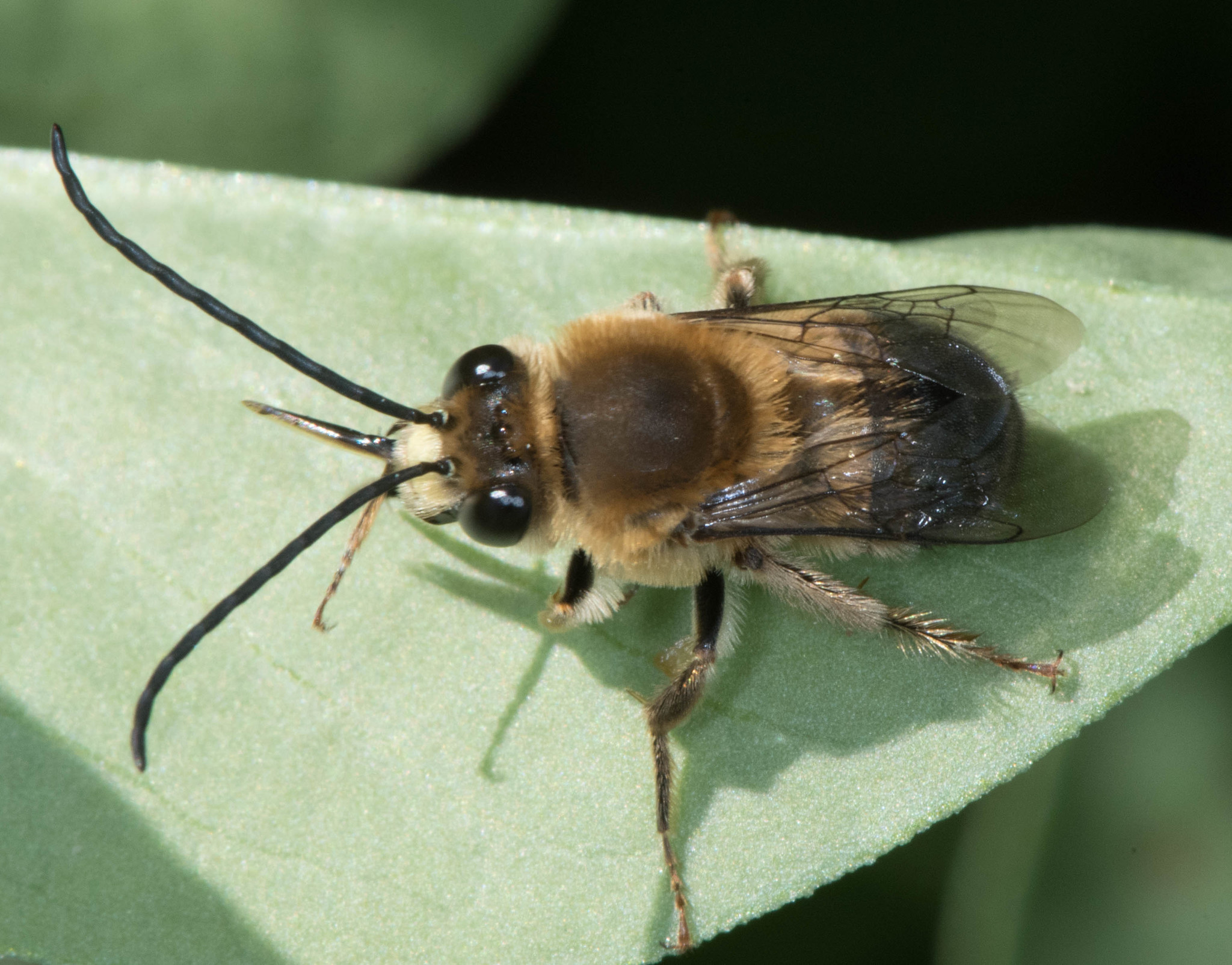

Scientific classification
- Domain: Eukaryota
- Kingdom: Animalia
- Phylum: Arthropoda
- Class: Insecta
- Order: Hymenoptera
- Family: Apidae
- Genus: Eucera
- Species: E. frater

Binomial name
- Eucera frater (Cresson, 1878)

= Eucera frater =

Species of bee

Eucera frater is a species of long-horned bee in the family Apidae. It is found in North America.

== Subspecies ==
These three subspecies belong to the species Eucera frater:

- Eucera frater albopilosa (Fowler, 1899)
- Eucera frater frater (Cresson, 1878)
- Eucera frater lata (Provancher, 1888)
