= Xenoglossa kansensis =

Scientific classification
- Kingdom: Animalia
- Phylum: Arthropoda
- Class: Insecta
- Order: Hymenoptera
- Family: Apidae
- Tribe: Eucerini
- Genus: Xenoglossa
- Species: X. kansensis

Binomial name
- Xenoglossa kansensis Cockerell, 1905

Species of bee

Xenoglossa kansensis, the Kansas squash bee, is a species of long-horned bee in the family Apidae. It is found in North America.
