= Eucera edwardsii =

Scientific classification
- Domain: Eukaryota
- Kingdom: Animalia
- Phylum: Arthropoda
- Class: Insecta
- Order: Hymenoptera
- Family: Apidae
- Genus: Eucera
- Species: E. edwardsii

Binomial name
- Eucera edwardsii (Cresson, 1878)

Species of bee

Eucera edwardsii is a species of long-horned bee in the family Apidae. It is found in Central America and North America.
