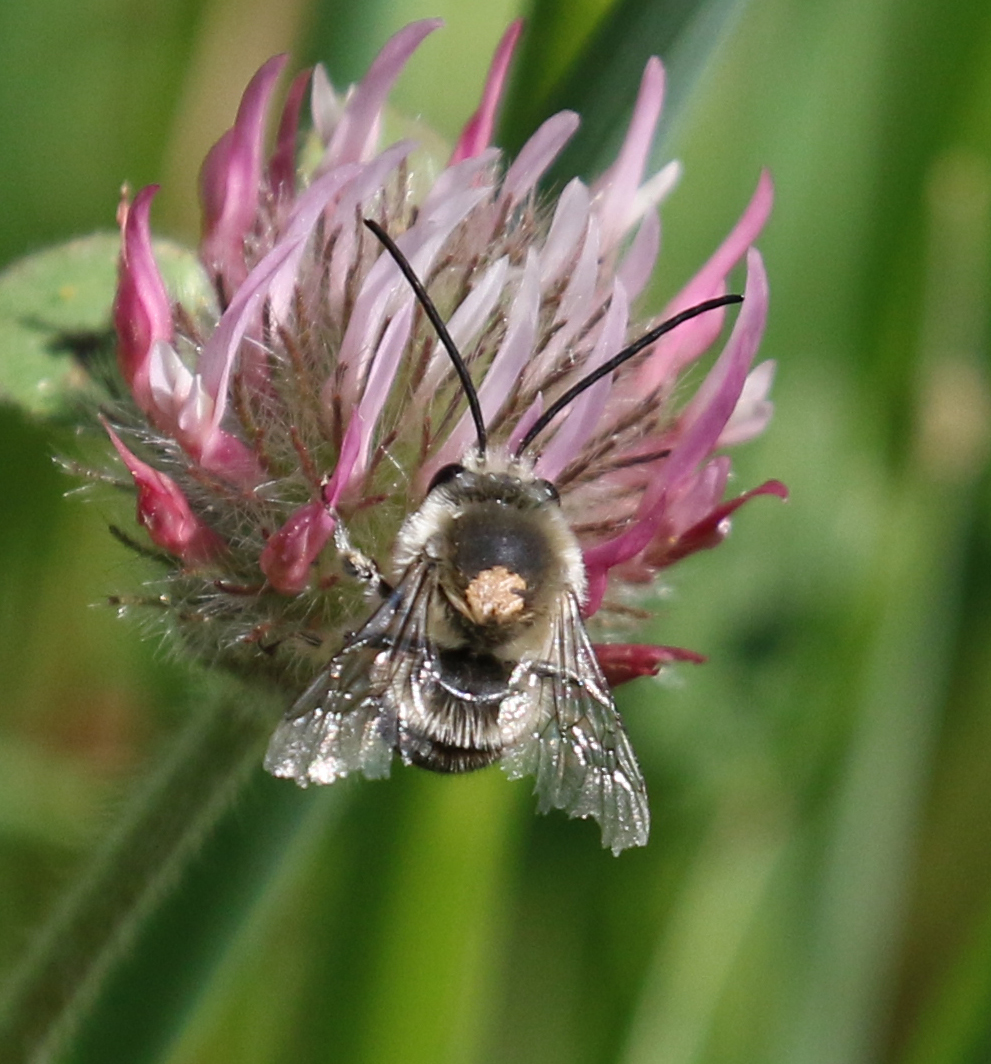

Scientific classification
- Domain: Eukaryota
- Kingdom: Animalia
- Phylum: Arthropoda
- Class: Insecta
- Order: Hymenoptera
- Family: Apidae
- Genus: Eucera
- Species: E. actuosa

Binomial name
- Eucera actuosa (Cresson, 1878)

= Eucera actuosa =

Species of bee

Eucera actuosa is a species of long-horned bee in the family Apidae. It is found in North America.
