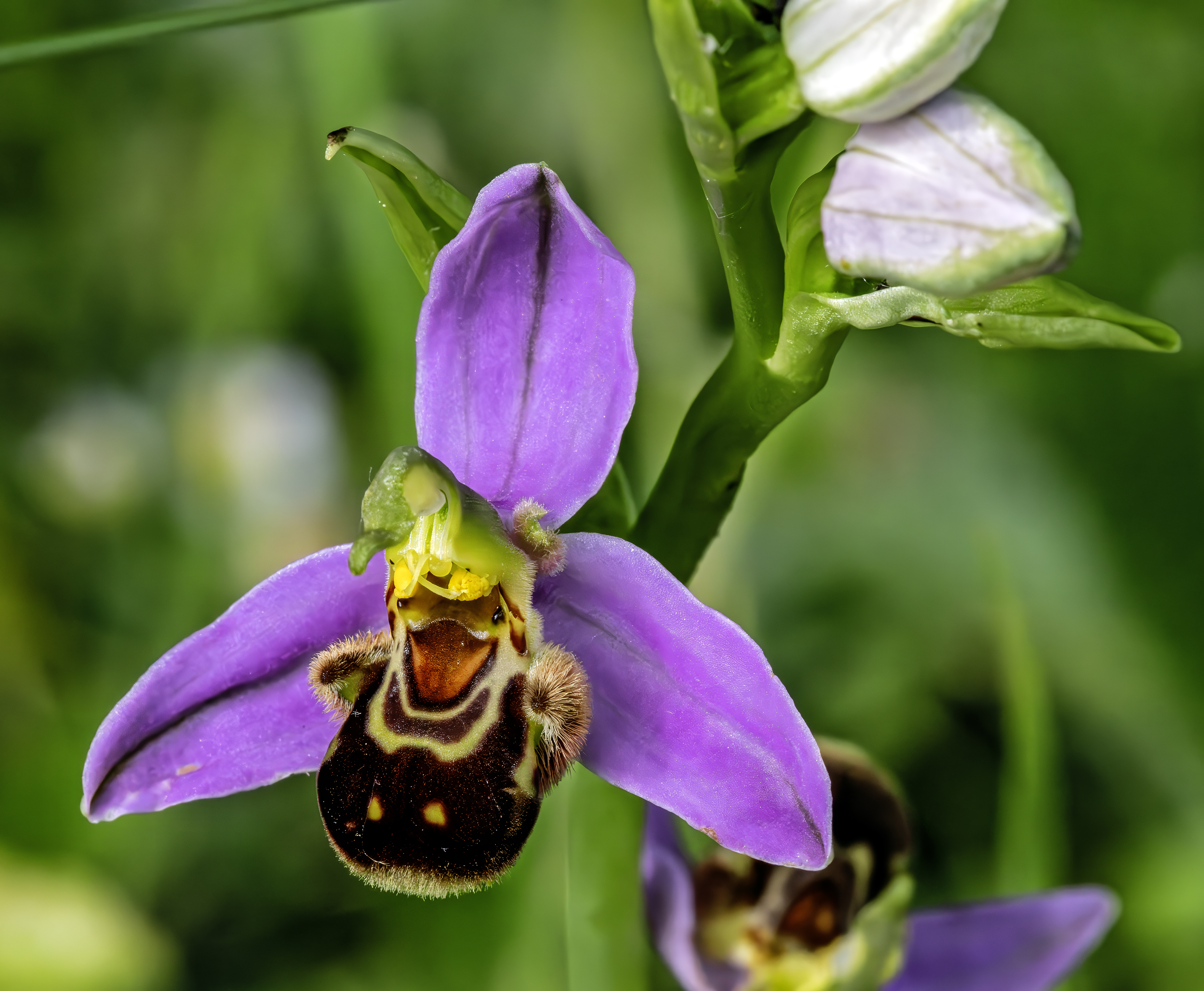

Scientific classification
- Kingdom: Plantae
- Clade: Tracheophytes
- Clade: Angiosperms
- Clade: Monocots
- Order: Asparagales
- Family: Orchidaceae
- Subfamily: Orchidoideae
- Genus: Ophrys
- Species: O. apifera

Binomial name
- Ophrys apifera Huds.

Synonyms
- Orchis apifera (Huds.) Salisb.; Arachnites apifera (Huds.) Hoffm.; Ophrys chlorantha Hegetschw. & Heer; Ophrys insectifera var. andrachnites

= Ophrys apifera =

Species of flowering plant in the orchid family

Ophrys apifera, known in Europe as the bee orchid, is a perennial herbaceous plant of the genus Ophrys, in the family of Orchidaceae. It serves as an example of sexually deceptive pollination and floral mimicry, a highly selective and highly evolved plant–pollinator relationship.

== Description ==
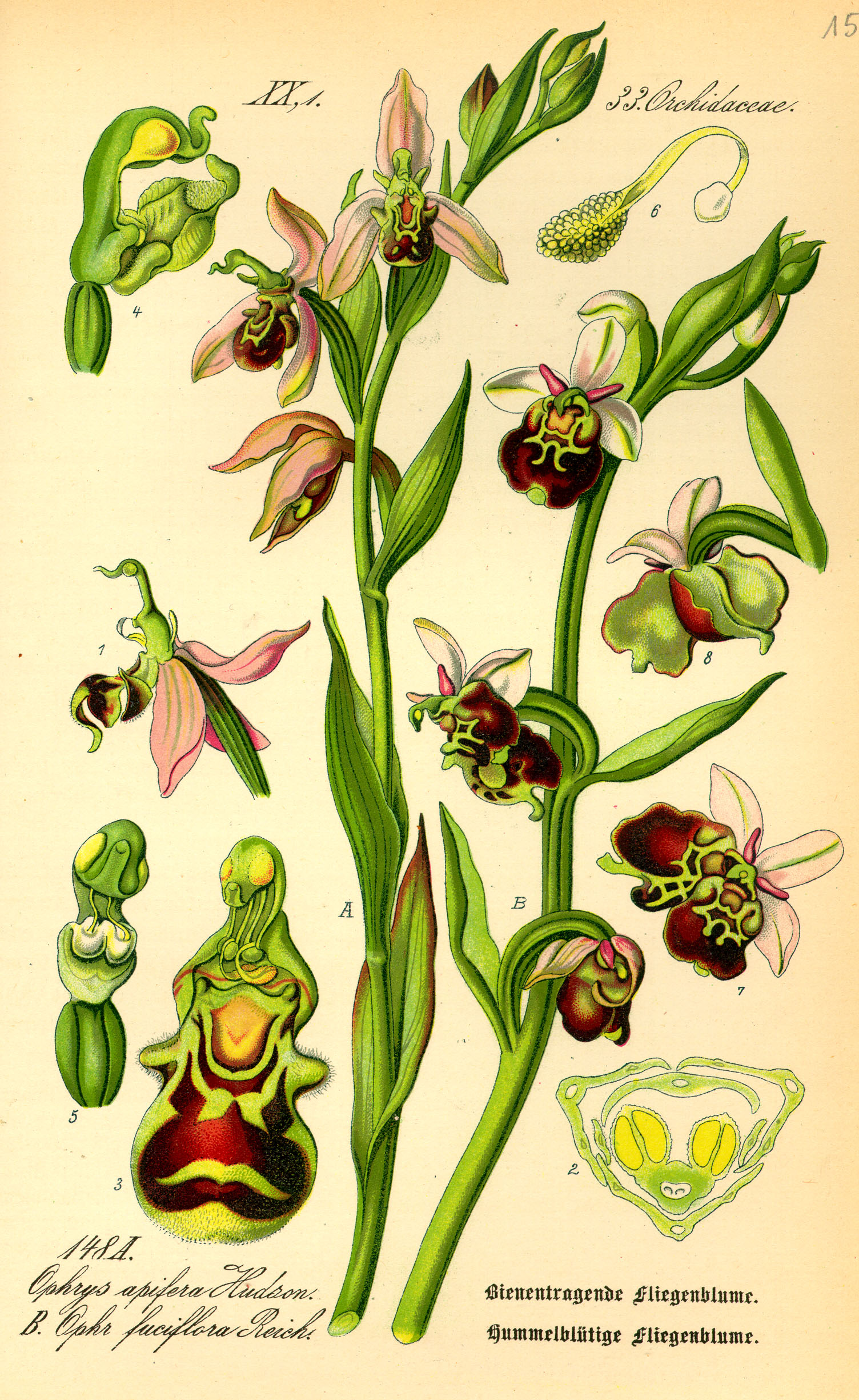
Illustration of leaf and flower morphology for Ophrys apifera (left) and Ophrys fuciflora (right)

Ophrys apifera grows to a height of 15–50 centimetres (6–20 in). This hardy orchid develops small rosettes of leaves in autumn that continue to grow slowly during winter. Basal leaves are ovate or oblong-lanceolate, and upper leaves and bracts are ovate-lanceolate and sheathing. Leaves exhibit parallel venation. The plant blooms from mid-April in continental Europe, but in the United Kingdom it flowers June to July. A flower spike is produced, composed of one to twelve flowers. Three large, purple sepals surround the base of the flower, which can easily be mistaken for petals. The true petals lie just above the sepals as two short, pubescent green structures protruding laterally from a central column. A third, modified petal, the labellum, sits at the bottom of the column as a landing pad for pollinators. The labellum is trilobed, with two pronounced humps on the hairy lateral lobes and a hairy median lobe having a pattern that mimics the abdomen of a bee. The pattern of labellum colouration is quite variable.

The central column is an adaptation unique to orchids, in which the stamens and pistil fused together to form one central rib. The anther cap can be found at the top, dorsal side of the column, while the stigma is hidden below on the ventral side. Two pollinia hang from the column over the labellum.

== Distribution ==
Ophrys apifera is widespread across central and southern Europe, as well as North Africa and the Middle East. Its range stretches from Portugal, Ireland and Denmark east to Iran and the Caucasus. It is quite common in the Mediterranean region eastwards to the Black Sea, (Codes) but is less common in its northern range being uncommon or local in Germany and Ireland.

In the United Kingdom, it has a distinct southeastern preference, being more common in England. Recently it has been found in the southwest of England in Butleigh near Glastonbury in Somerset and Dorchester, Dorset; whereas it is only to be found in coastal regions of Wales as well as the Hodbarrow Nature Reserve in Millom, Cumbria, and some parts of Northern Ireland. It is relatively common in the northeast of England and in recent years large numbers have appeared in the grass verges surrounding the Metro Centre in Gateshead. In Scotland, it was thought to be extinct, but was rediscovered in Ayrshire in 2003. In some countries the plants have protected status. They are unusual in that in some years they appear in great numbers, then sometimes only reappear after an absence of many years.

The genus Ophrys is the most species-rich (i.e. diverse) genus of orchids in Europe and the Mediterranean with over 200 species, according to Orchids of Britain and Europe by Pierre Delforge.

== Habitat and ecology ==
Ophrys apifera generally grows on semi-dry turf, in grassland, on limestone, calcareous dunes or in open areas in woodland. It prefers well-drained calcareous soils, low in nutrients, in bright light or dim light. It is a major colonizer of sites disturbed by human activity, such as old quarries, roadside verges and airfields. O. apifera is one of the most likely European orchid species to establish itself within towns and cities.

In order to extract sufficient nutrients from the substrata it grows in, Ophrys apifera relies upon a symbiotic relationship with mycorrhizal fungi in the genus Tulasnella, and possibly other genera.

Bee orchids are threatened by mowing during flowering, or before the seed has been released. However, they often also disappear from sites that become overgrown with shrubs and/or trees, as the orchids fail to compete with these large plants for light. For these reasons, bee orchids are often found on the edge of mown areas, beside paths or within areas that are mown very infrequently. The Sussex Wildlife Trust recommends mowing at the end of July and removing the cuttings to benefit bee orchids. In prehistory, the species presumably relied upon seasonal grazing pressure, or was limited to early succession habitats and permanent grassland.

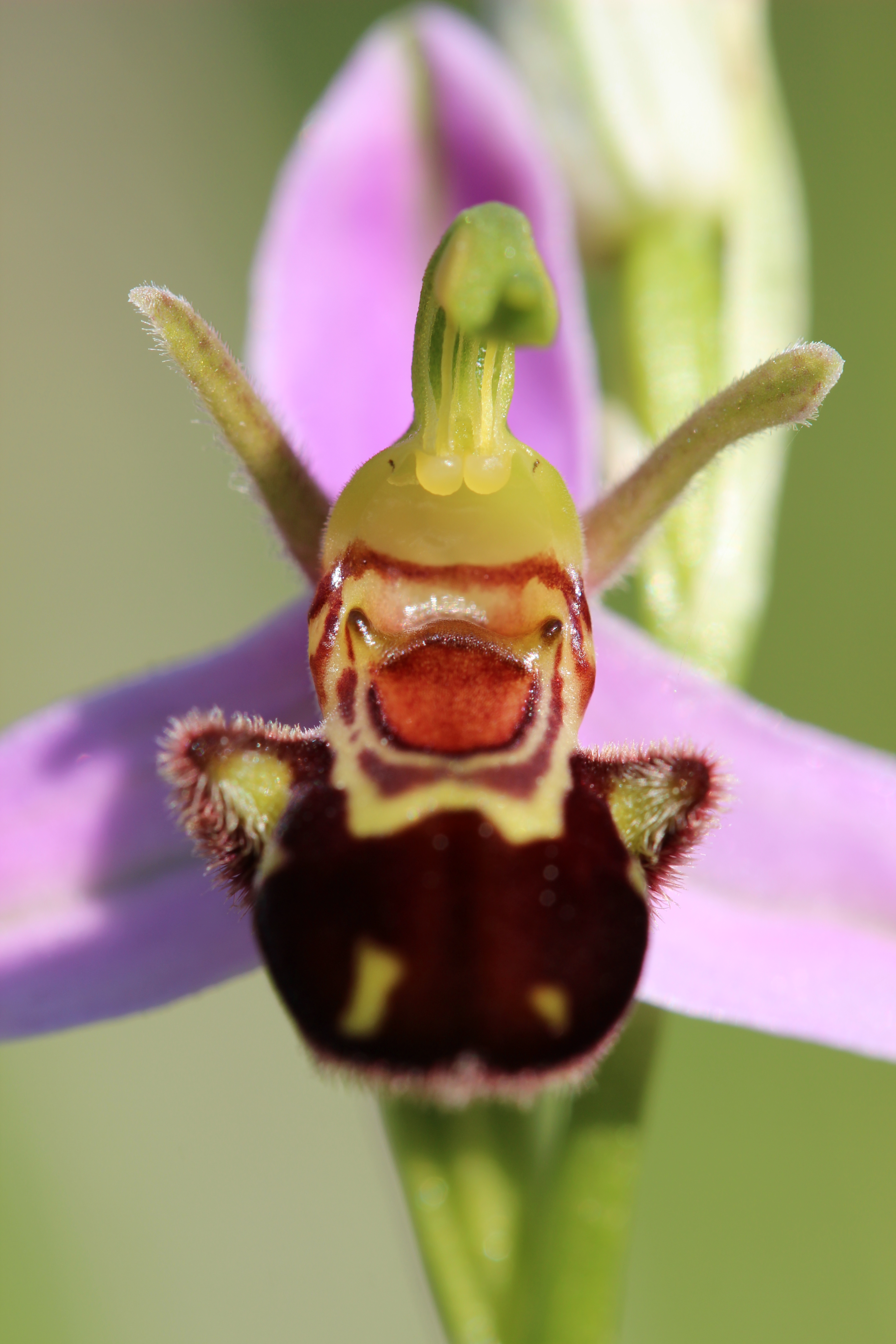
Flower of Ophrys apifera. Sepals, petals, labellum, column, and pollinia are all visible.

== Reproduction ==
Ophrys apifera has been considered to preferentially practice self-pollination. The flowers are almost exclusively self-pollinating in the northern ranges of the plant's distribution, however pollination by the solitary bee Eucera longicornis occurs in the Mediterranean region, where Ophrys apifera is more common. E. longicornis males have been observed attempting to copulate with the flowers, which emit allomones that mimic the scent of the female bee. These allomones are also known to attract bee species Tetralonia cressa and Eucera pulveraceae. In addition to chemosensory mimicry, the labellum of the flower acts as a visual decoy that the male bee confuses for a female. It is believed that male bees preferentially select orchids with the most bee-like labellum and attempt copulation, at which point the pollinia stick to the bee during the pseudocopulation. This achieves pollen transfer and, potentially, pollination.

Ophrys like other orchids are dependent on symbiotic fungi at some point during their life cycle, but especially for germination, which may take months or even years underground. Orchid roots contain orchid mycorrhiza, coils of fungal hyphae inside orchid root cells.

== Phytochemistry ==
Floral parts display the presence of quercetin and kaempferol glycosides, which are supposed to be acylated, as well as cinnamic acid derivatives. The pink outer tepals show the presence of anthocyanins.

== Culture ==
The name Ophrys derives from the Greek word ophrys, meaning "eyebrow." It is believed that women in ancient Rome used to darken their eyebrows with the orchid plant, thus giving it its name. The Latin specific epithet apifera means "bee-bearing" or "bee-bringing" and refers to the bee-shaped labellum of the orchid.

Its root tubers were ground into a powder called salep in the Ottoman Empire, which was believed to have nutritional, medicinal, and aphrodisiac values. The product's popularity spread to England in the 17th and 18th century and then to a few other European countries. Salep is still used today in medicines and traditional dishes in Turkey, which was formerly the region of the Ottoman Empire, and throughout the Middle East. It is also a popular import in the Netherlands, Cyprus, and Germany for its supposed medicinal properties.

Ophrys apifera is the county flower of Bedfordshire.

This species has appeared on postage stamps in many countries including Belgium, Cambodia, Czech Republic, Germany, Ireland, Israel, Liechtenstein, Luxembourg, Slovenia, the United Kingdom and the USSR. In 2009 the bee orchid appeared in a series of stamps printed in the United Kingdom to celebrate the 150th anniversary of the publication of Charles Darwin's Origin of Species.

== Conservation ==
=== Ecological concerns ===
There are local extinctions of Ophrys spp. and potentially O. apifera in Turkey and Iran due to the excessive harvesting of wild orchids to produce salep products.

Since O. apifera relies heavily on its symbiotic relationship with Tulasnella fungi for survival, it is vulnerable to any chemicals, particularly fungicides, and threats which might reduce the fungi's prevalence.

=== Species status ===
O. apifera has been designated as a Protected species in Northern Ireland, an Endangered (EN) species in Turkey, Ukraine, and Carpathian Mountains, and a Critically Endangered (CR) species in Czech Republic and Slovakia.

=== Laws/regulations ===
The Convention on International Trade in Endangered Species of Wild Fauna and Flora (CITES) named O. apifera an endangered species that is potentially an object of trade, setting strict regulations on trade of salep products. Turkey, Iran, Germany, the Netherlands, and Cyprus are all Parties to CITES and, in theory, must follow those regulations.

Turkey has banned the export of true salep (salep made from an orchid root).

== Taxonomy ==
The specific evolutionary relationships between members of this genus are still poorly understood, and the best method for classifying orchid species and their variants is highly debated. Some researchers propose classifying species based on their pollination tactics, while others propose classifying them based on the type of chemical emitted from the flower. A widely used and generally accepted method of classification distinguishes orchid species based on flower morphology. The taxonomy of O. apifera based on this classification scheme is as follows:

Kingdom Plantae, Phylum Tracheophyta, Subphylum Angiospermae, Class Liliopsida, Order Asparagales, Family Orchidaceae, Subfamily Orchidoideae, Genus Ophyrus, Species O. apifera.

== Varieties ==
- Ophrys apifera var. apifera
- Ophrys apifera var. aurita
- Ophrys apifera var. bicolor
- Ophrys apifera var. botteronii
- Ophrys apifera var. friburgensis
- Ophrys apifera var. immaculata
- Ophrys apifera var. trollii
- Ophrys apifera var. fulvofusca
- Ophrys apifera var. belgarum
- Ophrys apifera var. jurana
- Ophrys apifera var. atrofuscus
Varieties of Ophrys apifera

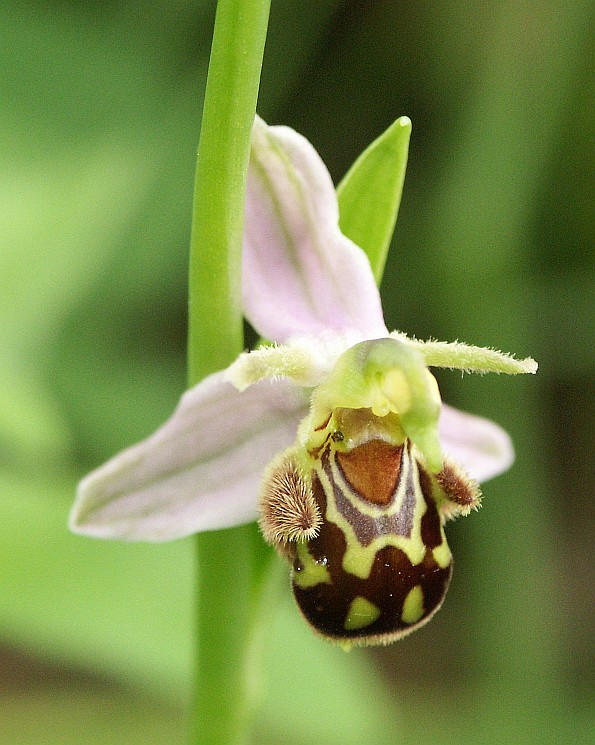
Ophrys apifera var. aurita

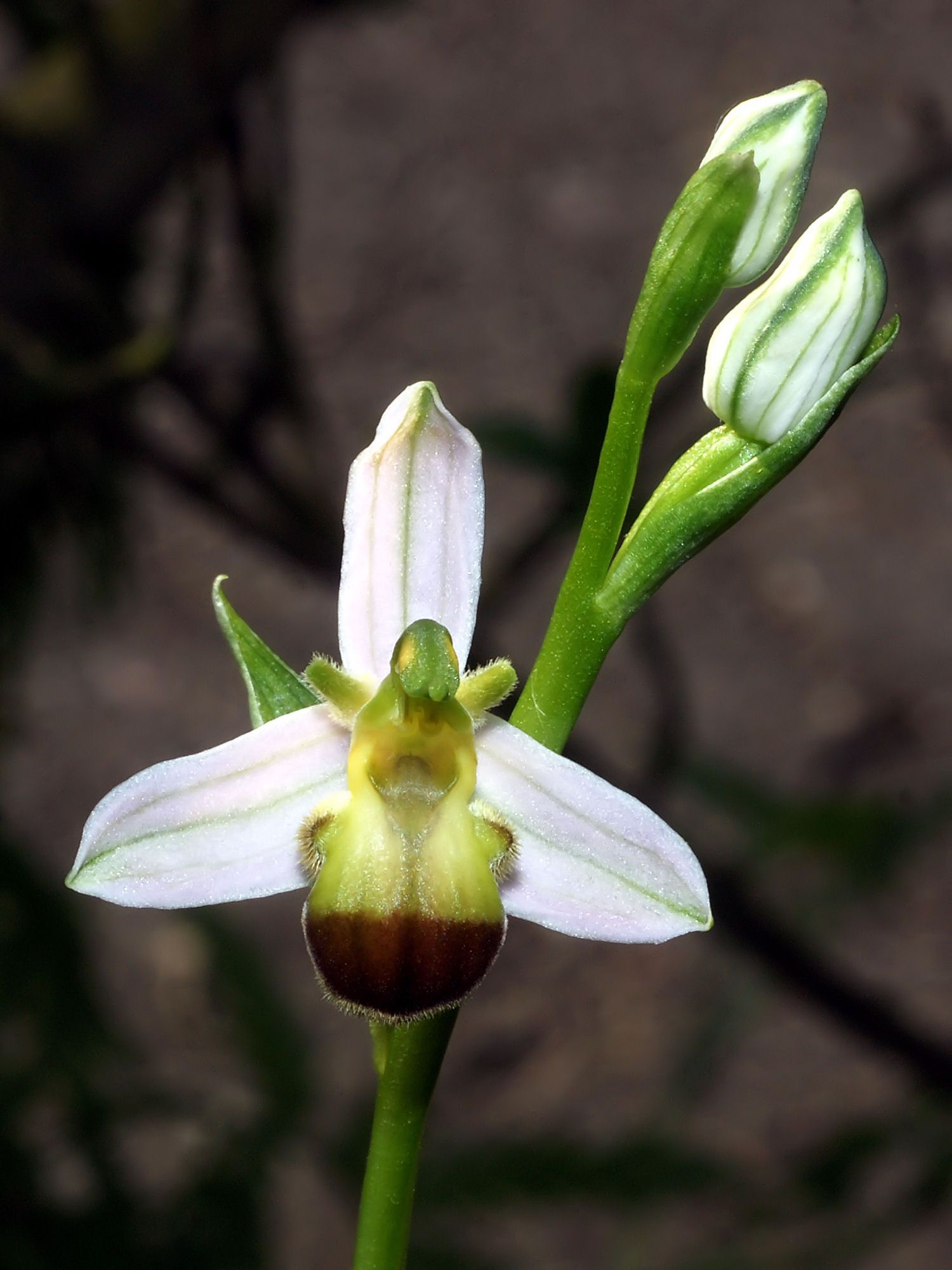
Ophrys apifera var. bicolor

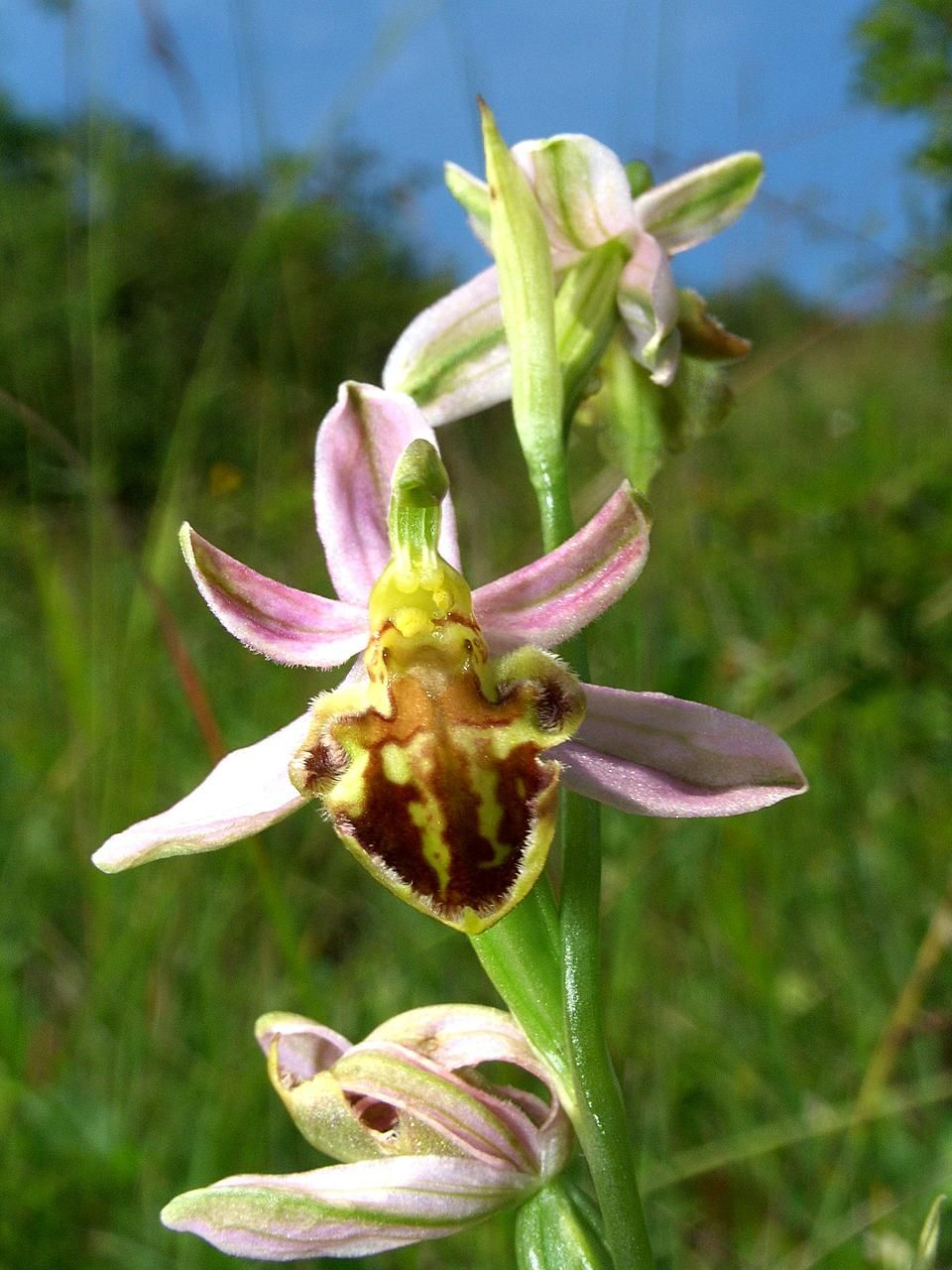
Ophrys apifera var. botteronii

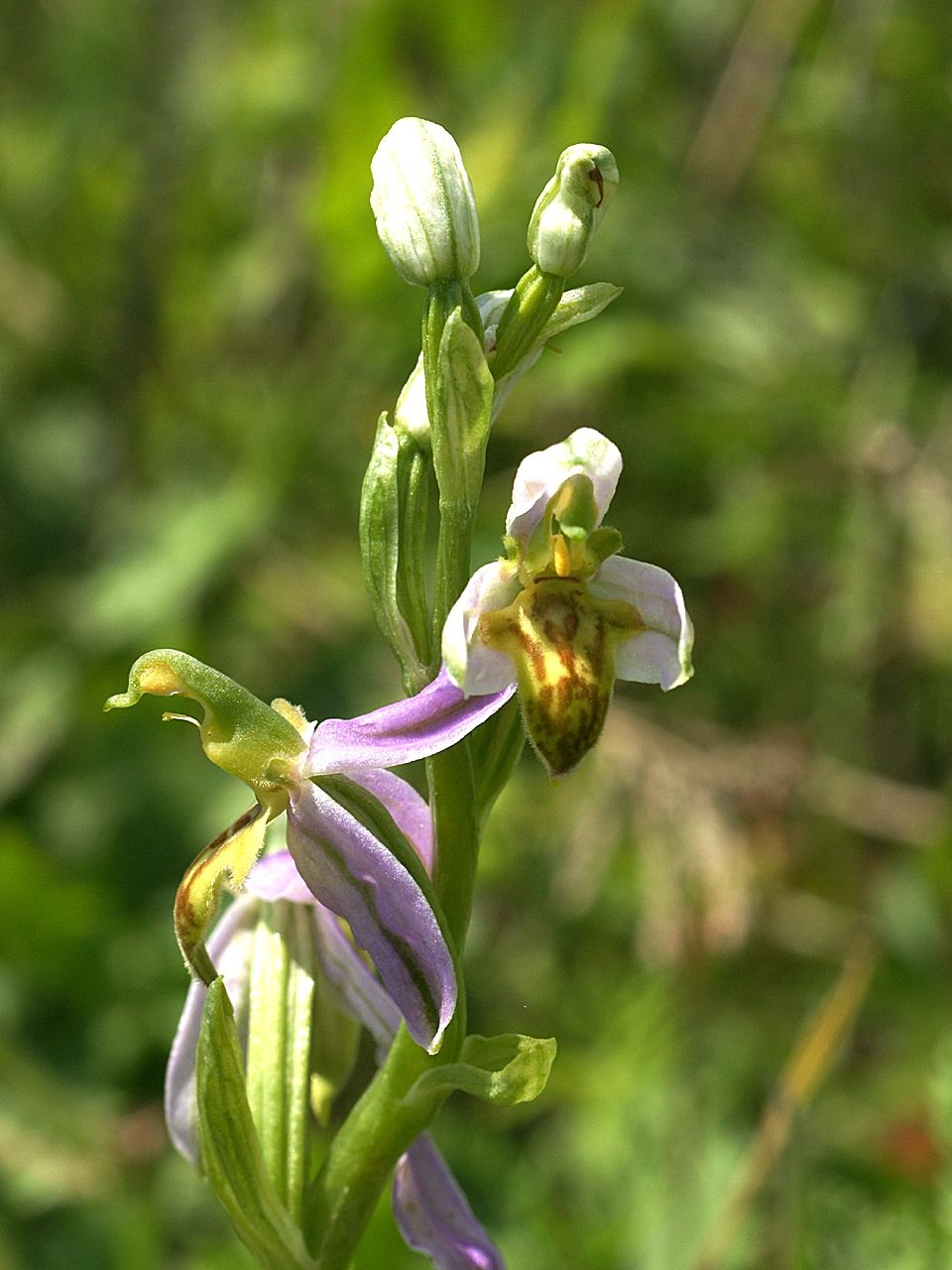
Ophrys apifera var. trollii

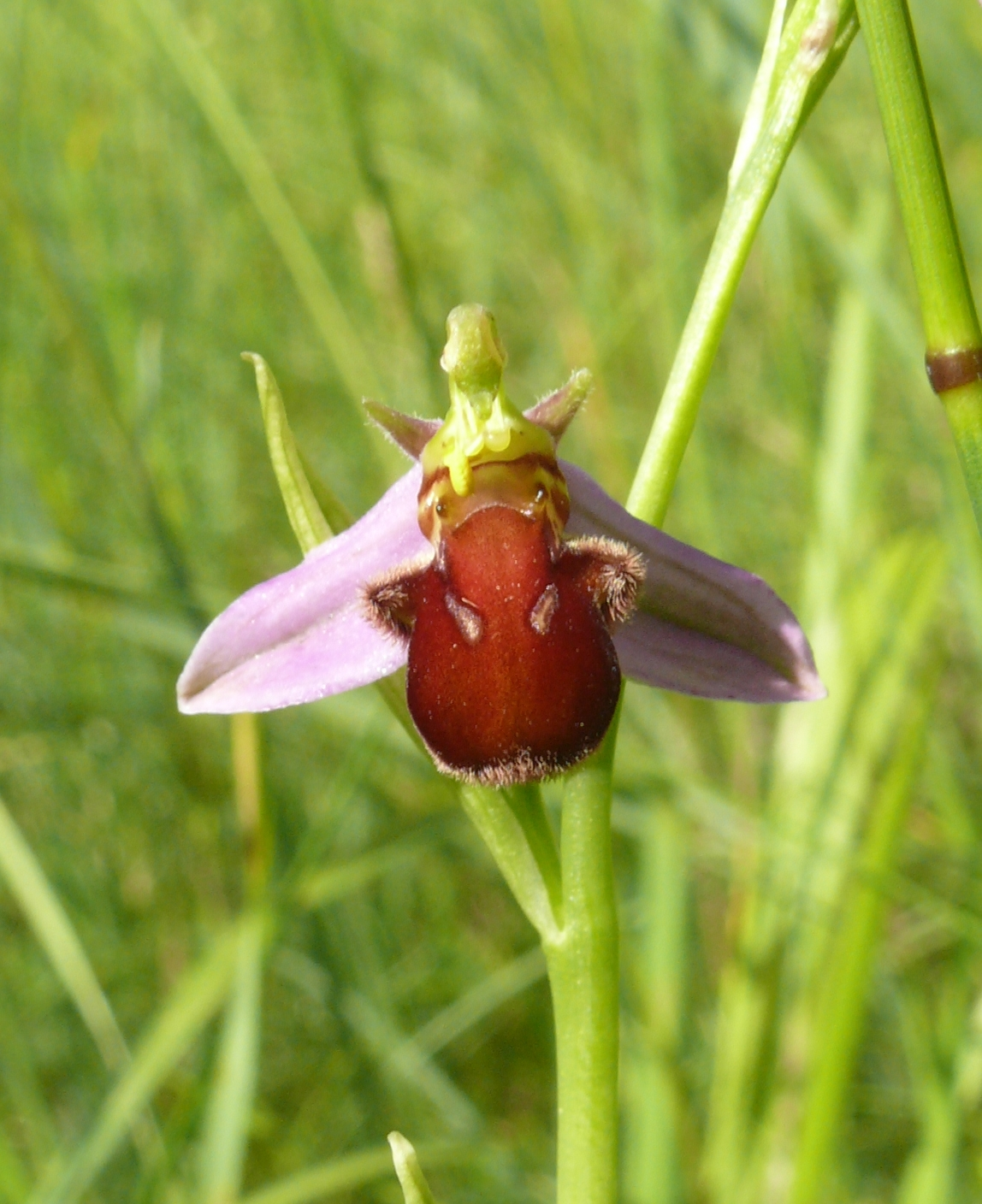
Ophrys apifera var. fulvofusca

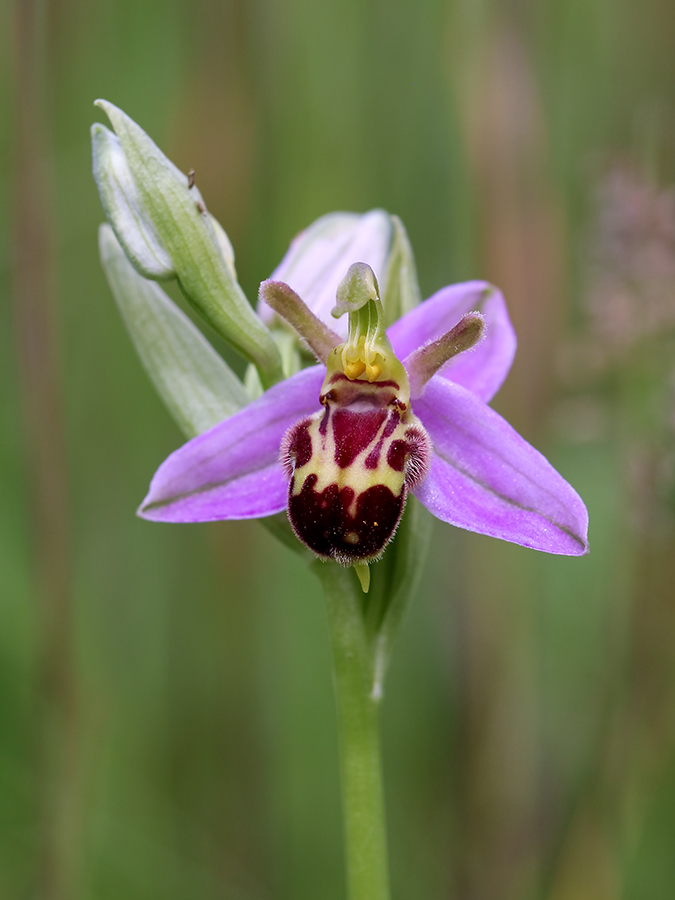
Ophrys apifera var. belgarum

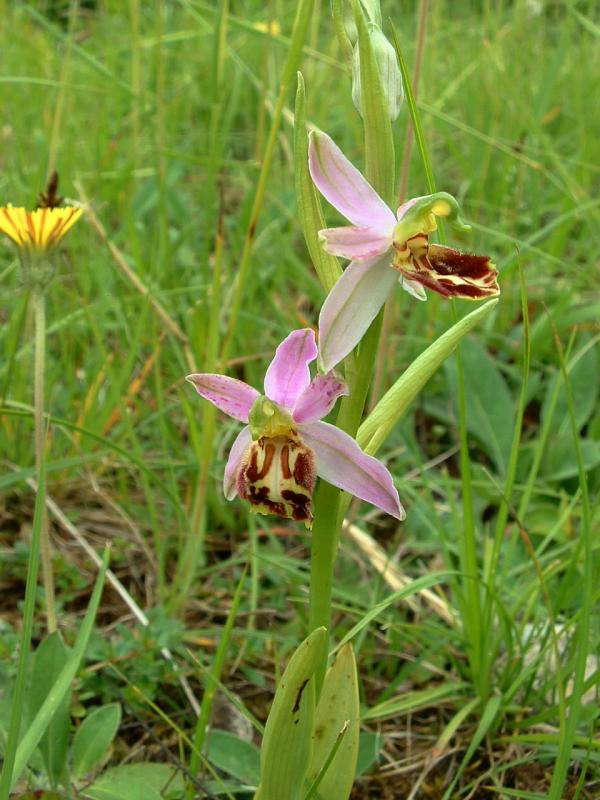
Ophrys apifera var. jurana
