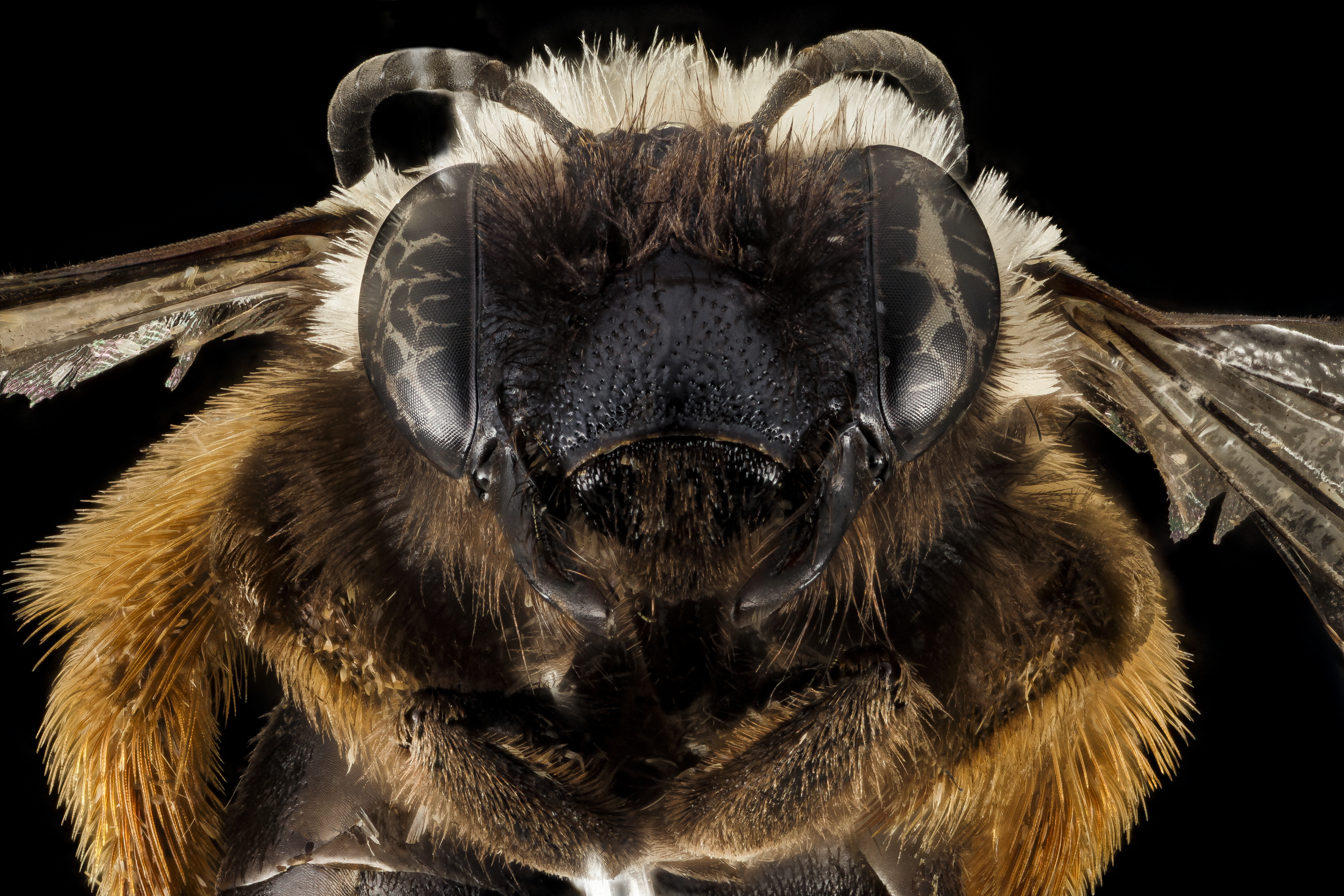

Scientific classification
- Domain: Eukaryota
- Kingdom: Animalia
- Phylum: Arthropoda
- Class: Insecta
- Order: Hymenoptera
- Family: Apidae
- Genus: Eucera
- Species: E. fulvitarsis

Binomial name
- Eucera fulvitarsis (Cresson, 1878)

= Eucera fulvitarsis =

Species of bee

Eucera fulvitarsis is a species of long-horned bee in the family Apidae. It is found in North America.

== Subspecies ==
These two subspecies belong to the species Eucera fulvitarsis:

- Eucera fulvitarsis annae (Cockerell, 1906)
- Eucera fulvitarsis fulvitarsis (Cresson, 1878)
