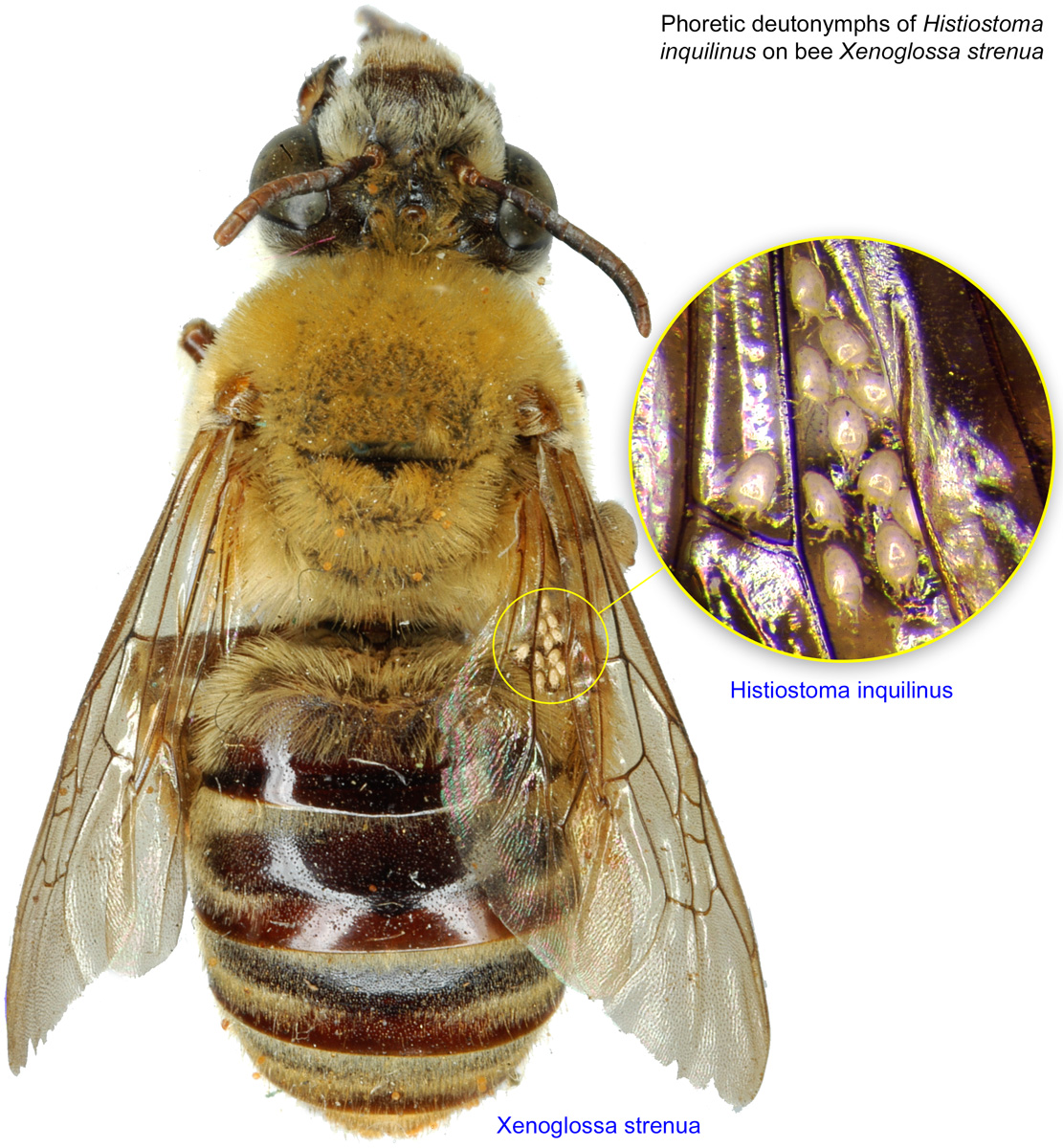
- Xenoglossa strenua

Scientific classification
- Domain: Eukaryota
- Kingdom: Animalia
- Phylum: Arthropoda
- Class: Insecta
- Order: Hymenoptera
- Family: Apidae
- Subfamily: Apinae
- Tribe: Eucerini
- Genus: Xenoglossa; Smith, 1854

= Xenoglossa =

Genus of bees

Xenoglossa is a genus of large squash bees in the family Apidae. There are about 11 described species in Xenoglossa.

== Species ==
These 11 species belong to the genus Xenoglossa:

- Xenoglossa angustior Cockerell, 1899
- Xenoglossa dugesi Cockerell
- Xenoglossa fulva Smith, 1854
- Xenoglossa gabbii (Cresson, 1878)
- Xenoglossa howardi Cockerell
- Xenoglossa kansensis Cockerell, 1905 (Kansas squash bee)
- Xenoglossa mustelina (Fox, 1893)
- Xenoglossa patricia Cockerell, 1896
- Xenoglossa rhodophila Cockerell
- Xenoglossa spriuna Howard
- Xenoglossa strenua (Cresson, 1878)
