= Troublesome Formation =

Geological formation and fossil deposit in Colorado

- Stratigraphic range: Neogene
- Type: Formation
- Thickness: 1000 ft or more

Location
- Region: Colorado
- Country: United States

The Troublesome Formation is a geologic formation in Colorado. It preserves fossils dating back to the Neogene period. It consists of Pale shades of pink, tan, gray, green, and white interbedded siltstone and mudstone, less abundant arkosic sandstone and conglomerate, and sparse limestone and altered crystal-vitric ash and tuff; generally poorly consolidated. It includes atypical deposits containing abundant pink, granitic cobbles and boulders along the western parts of the outcrop in the west-central and southwestern parts of the Granby Quadrangle, Fossil mammals from three sites indicate a late Oligocene age (Kron, 1988).

== See also ==
- List of fossiliferous stratigraphic units in Colorado
- Paleontology in Colorado
