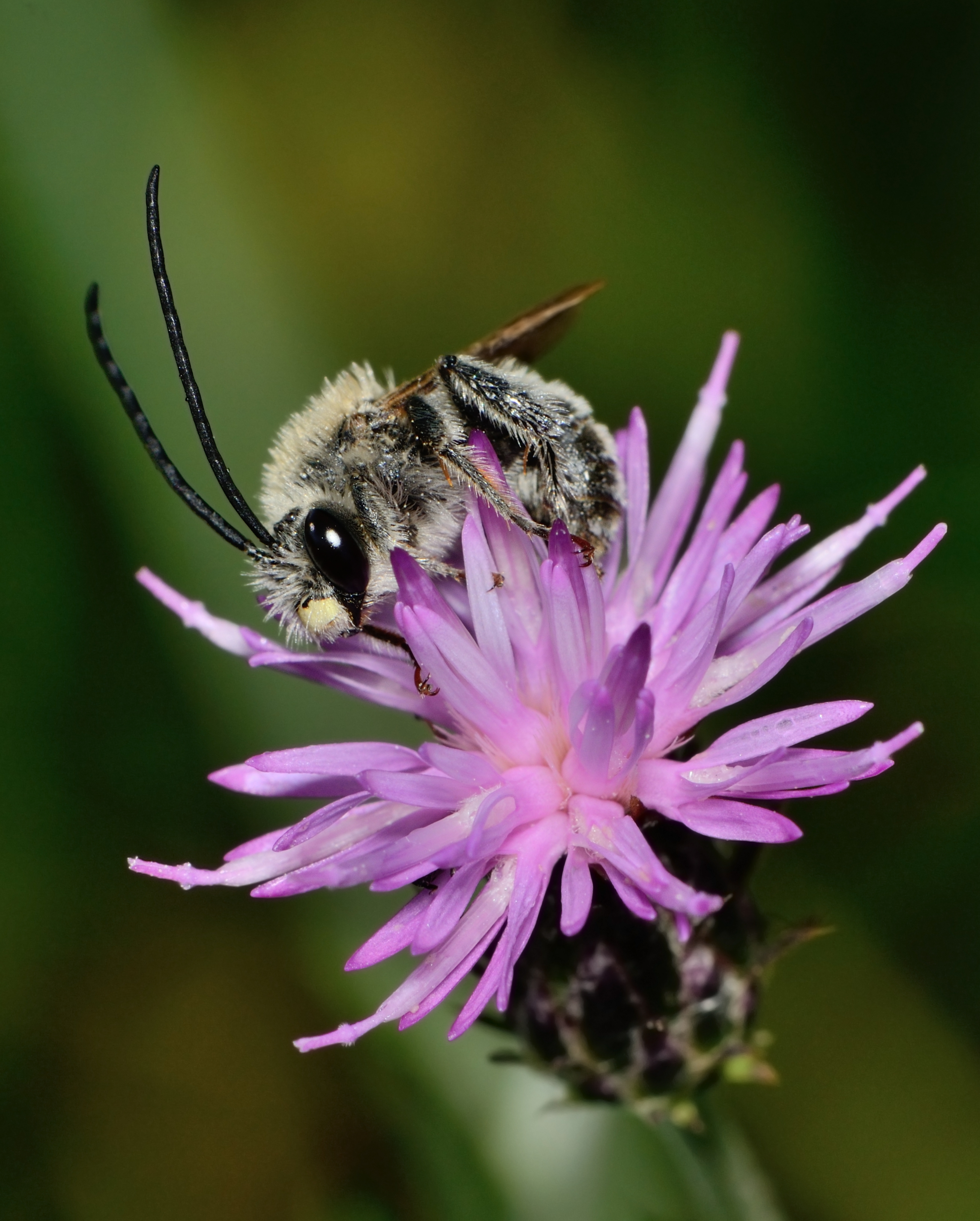
- Eucera cinnamomea, male

Scientific classification
- Kingdom: Animalia
- Phylum: Arthropoda
- Class: Insecta
- Order: Hymenoptera
- Family: Apidae
- Tribe: Eucerini
- Genus: Eucera; Scopoli, 1770

Subgenera
- Eucera (Eucera) Scopoli, 1770; Eucera (Hetereucera) Tkalcu, 1978; Eucera (Oligeucera) Sitdikov & Pesenko, 1988; Eucera (Pteneucera) Tkalcu, 1984; Eucera (Synhalonia) Patton, 1879

Synonyms
- Eucera (Agatheucera) Sitdikov & Pesenko, 1988; Eucera (Atopeucera) Tkalcu, 1984; Eucera (Hemieucera) Sitdikov & Pesenko, 1988; Eucera (Pareucera) Tkalcu, 1978; Eucera (Pileteucera) Sitdikov & Pesenko, 1988; Eucera (Rhyteucera) Sitdikov & Pesenko, 1988; Eucera (Stilbeucera) Tkalcu, 1978; Eusynhalonia Ashmead, 1899; Synalonia Robertson, 1905

= Eucera =

Genus of bees

Eucera is a genus of bees in the family Apidae, which comprises more than 100 species. These bees are commonly known as long-horned bees due to their characteristically long antennae, especially in males. Eucera species can be found in diverse habitats, including meadows, fields, and urban gardens, primarily in the Palearctic and Nearctic regions, covering parts of Europe, Asia, North Africa, and North America.

Eucera bees play a crucial role in pollinating a wide range of flowering plants. They are solitary bees, meaning that each female builds and provisions her own nest without forming social colonies like honeybees. Female Eucera bees construct their nests in the ground, typically in well-drained, sandy soils. They lay their eggs within the nest and provide a food supply for their offspring by collecting pollen and nectar from flowers.

Eucera bees are active from spring to fall, and their flight period often coincides with the blooming period of their preferred flowering plants. They are generalist pollinators, meaning they visit a wide variety of flowers, but some species show preferences for specific plants or families, such as legumes or sunflowers.

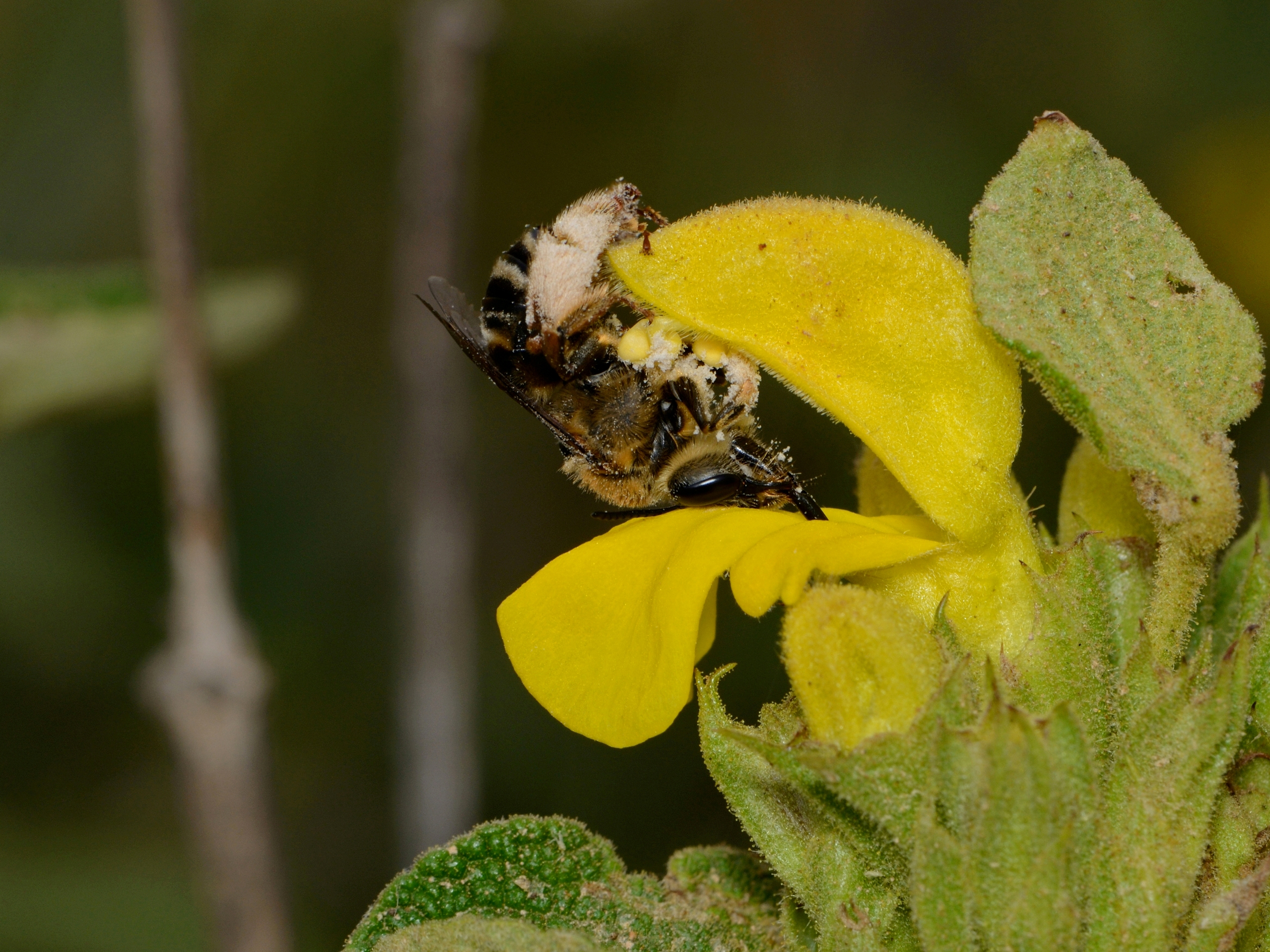
Eucera plumigera, female

== Description ==
As in most members of the tribe Eucerini, the antennae of males are very long. Old World Eucera can be identified through having five or six maxillary palpomeres, with the first flagellomere shorter than the scape and the clypeus protruding in front of the compound eye by at least the width of the eye in side view. These characteristics are found in both sexes. Additionally, the males have convergent carinae on their sixth ventral abdominal segment (sternite). Eucera species nest in the ground.

== Morphology ==
Eucera have a thick layer of fur and are dark in color. They have a protuberant clypeus and are typically around 0.4 to 0.7 inches long. The size of bees in the genus Eucera range from 11 to 18 mm. When emerging from nests, an immature Eucera nigrilabris male will be somewhat red in color and a bit sluggish. A mature Eucera nigrilabris male will appear grey in color and more active.

=== Sexual dimorphism ===
In Eucera berlandi, males have long antennae containing three times the amount of neurons for olfaction and ten times more pore plates than females.

== Distribution ==
Eucera is holarctic. Research shows that the Eucera complex originated in the Nearctic region in the late Oligocene and dispersed twice. The first dispersal having occurred as far as 24.2-16.6 million years ago during the warmer summer season and later again 13.9-12.3 million years ago during the springtime, allowing Eucera to thrive in cooler regions.

== Phylogeny ==
Eucera belongs to the tribe Eucerini and makes up roughly 50% of the tribe. Historically, the genus had 219 species classified in five subgenera, of which 78 species were known from Europe. However, six genera have recently been added to the genus Eucera as new subgenera: Tetralonia, Peponapis, Syntrichalonia, Cemolobus, Xenoglossodes and Xenoglossa.

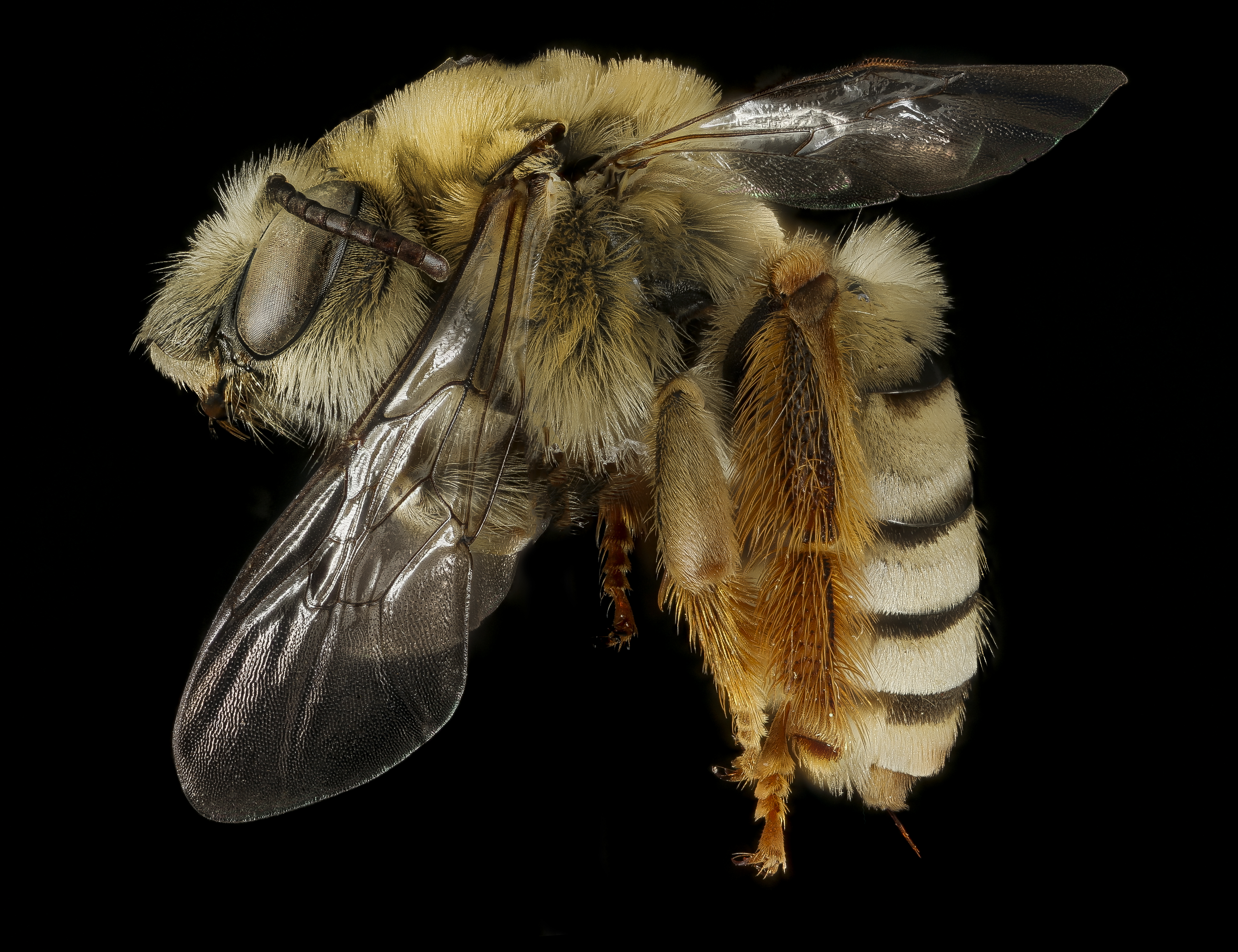
Eucera aragalli side

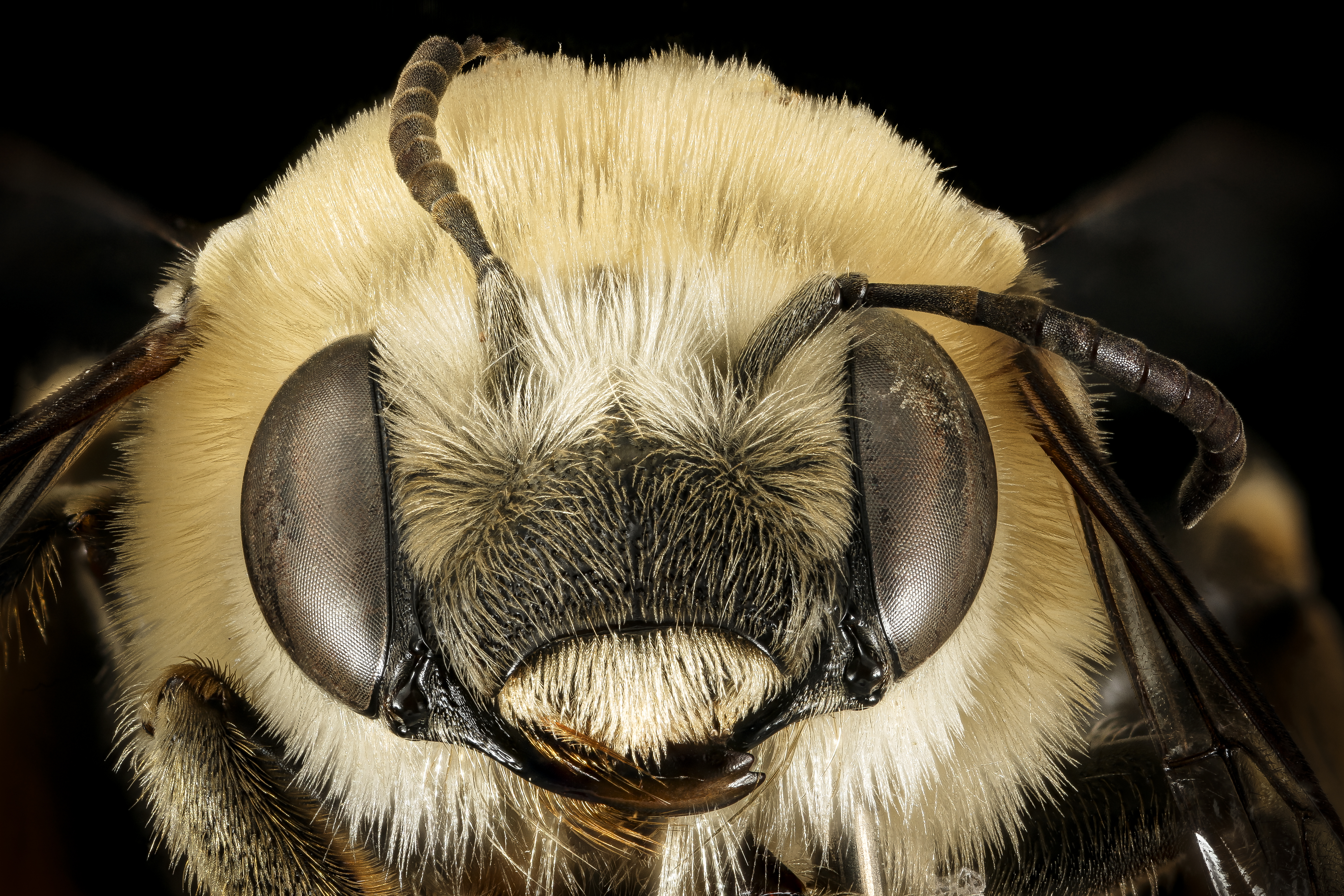
Eucera aragalli face

== Behavior ==
In the Middle East, Eucera are active in the months of February to May.

=== Flight behavior ===
Eucera have a spring flight season.

=== Nesting behavior ===
Eucera are solitary bees that nest within the ground. They tend to nest in areas that are composed of clay or sand. It is a characteristic of all bees of the genus Eucera to have vertical and elongated cells within nests. There are around two to three cells per nest, which are found branching off of the main tunnel. In Eucera nigrilabris, each tunnel harbors four to six cells. The first few cells are false cells and are not used for reproductive purposes. The cells below the false cells are used to lay eggs. Also, the entirety of the tunnel is lined with wax. For nesting, Eucera nigrilabris prefers soil of lower sodicity and salinity that has low calcium carbonate concentrations. They make lined nests that are about 85 cm into the ground. There has not been any observed occurrences of kleptoparasitism around Eucera nigrilabris nesting sites. Eucera palaestinae use their Dufour's gland to secrete a mixture of hydrocarbons, methyl esters, and unsaturated fatty acids which provide the nest with an odor. This odor helps the bees locate their home when living in a dense aggregation of nests.

=== Mating behavior ===
Eucera kullenbergi is known to fall victim to sexual deception by Ophrys leochroma flowers that mimic the sex pheromones of female bees. Eucera palaestinae live in dense nest aggregations with males emerging from their nests in the ground about a week before the females to take a look around the nesting site. Once the females emerge, males of the species will engage in aggressive competition to mate with them. Shortly after mating, the female becomes unreceptive. The initial attraction towards a female is by sight, but there is additional research suggesting that virgin females are distinguished by their specific scent and therefore are sought after more aggressively. It is thought that the cause of this sex attraction is due to small glands located on tergites on the abdomen. In Eucera nigrilabris, the males also emerge a few days earlier than females. Once the female emerges from the nest, males will fight with each other to mate. Mating time in this species occurs for 3–6 minutes, and once the female has mated, she becomes unresponsive.

=== Foraging behaviors ===
Eucera can be generalists or specialists in foraging preference. They are able to pollinate both agricultural and naturally occurring plants. They pollinate plants in the deserts of Israel and the Mediterranean. Eucera, like other efficient foragers, avoid going back to the same food source after it has been previously depleted. Research suggests that Eucera use a combination of reward-based-patch-leaving rule and scent marking strategy to avoid returning to previously visited sites. Eucera resemble bumblebees in this matter but it is believed that they use different strategies (bumblebees use a numerical strategy) suggesting that the difference in strategies may reflect the lower learning capabilities of solitary bees like Eucera when compared to the social bumblebee. Eucera cinerea has specialized thick bristles that curve and are used for foraging for pollen within flowers that have hidden anthers. Eucera from southwest France are known to mainly forage from Fabaceae and Brassicaceae plants. Peponapis and Xenoglossa are known to be specialists for squash plants, such as Cucurbita pepo. Peponapis pruinosa specializes on squash plants, and so the current distribution of this species in North America is due to the expansion of plant cultivation throughout North America. The species moved from Mesoamerica into the more temperate regions of North America.

== Sociality ==
Eucera, similar to the rest of the tribe Eucerini, are solitary by nature. In some highly eusocial bee species, such as honey bees, males are raised and fed in their colonies. Males of Eucera live their lives independently.

=== Alarm signaling ===
Eucera do not produce or respond to alarm pheromones as social bees do. Social bees are able to identify and avoid inflorescences that have the smell of dead bees of their species. This is possibly due to injured social bees releasing signals known as alarm signals to warn others of danger. Eucera do not showcase this behavior of avoiding inflorescences marked by dead bees and instead respond similarly to flowers that have predation alarm signals and flowers that do not have such alarm signals.

== Kleptoparasitism ==
The bee genus Nomada, a genus that typically lays their eggs in the nests of other bees, is most likely to kleptoparasitize Eucera bees.

== Species ==
List of Eucera species
