= List of Tetraloniella species =

This is a list of 105 species in Tetraloniella, a genus of long-horned bees in the family Apidae.

== Tetraloniella species ==
- Tetraloniella abessinica (Friese, 1915)^{i c g}
- Tetraloniella abrochia Eardley, 1989^{i c g}
- Tetraloniella albata (Cresson, 1872)^{i c g b}
- Tetraloniella alboscopacea (Friese, 1909)^{i c g}
- Tetraloniella alticincta (Lepeletier, 1841)^{i c g}
- Tetraloniella apicalis (Friese, 1905)^{i c g}
- Tetraloniella arizonica (Cockerell, 1937)^{i c}
- Tetraloniella ataxia Eardley, 1989^{i c g}
- Tetraloniella aurantiflava Eardley, 1989^{i c g}
- Tetraloniella auricauda (LaBerge, 1970)^{i c g}
- Tetraloniella ayala LaBerge, 2001^{i c g}
- Tetraloniella balluca LaBerge, 2001^{i c g}
- Tetraloniella bottandieri (Alfken, 1914)^{i c g}
- Tetraloniella braunsiana (Friese, 1905)^{i c g}
- Tetraloniella brevifellator (LaBerge, 1957)^{i c g}
- Tetraloniella brevikeraia Eardley, 1989^{i c g}
- Tetraloniella brevipennis (Cameron, 1898)^{i c g}
- Tetraloniella brooksi Eardley, 1989^{i c g}
- Tetraloniella cacuminis LaBerge, 2001^{i c g}
- Tetraloniella capensis (Lepeletier, 1841)^{i c g}
- Tetraloniella cinctella (Saunders, 1908)^{i c g}
- Tetraloniella crenulaticornis (Cockerell, 1898)^{i c g}
- Tetraloniella cressoniana (Cockerell, 1905)^{i c g}
- Tetraloniella davidsoni (Cockerell, 1905)^{i c}
- Tetraloniella dentata (Germar, 1839)^{i c g}
- Tetraloniella distata LaBerge, 2001^{i c g}
- Tetraloniella donata (Cresson, 1878)^{i c g}
- Tetraloniella elsei Eardley, 1989^{i c g}
- Tetraloniella eriocarpi (Cockerell, 1898)^{i c g b}
- Tetraloniella fasciata (LaBerge, 1970)^{i c g}
- Tetraloniella fasciatella (LaBerge, 1970)^{i c}
- Tetraloniella fastigiata LaBerge, 2001^{i c g}
- Tetraloniella flagellicornis (Smith, 1879)^{i c g}
- Tetraloniella flavifasciata (Cockerell, 1949)^{i c g}
- Tetraloniella flaviscopa (Hedicke, 1933)^{i c g}
- Tetraloniella friesei (Meade-Waldo, 1914)^{i c g}
- Tetraloniella fulvescens (Giraud, 1863)^{i c g}
- Tetraloniella fulvicornis Morawitz^{g}
- Tetraloniella fulvotecta (Cockerell, 1949)^{i c g}
- Tetraloniella glabricornis (Cameron, 1908)^{i c g}
- Tetraloniella graja (Eversmann, 1852)^{i c g}
- Tetraloniella helianthorum (Cockerell, 1914)^{i c g}
- Tetraloniella hohmanni (Tkalcu, 1993)^{i c g}
- Tetraloniella holli (Alfken, 1914)^{i c g}
- Tetraloniella iberica Dusmet y Alonso, 1926^{g}
- Tetraloniella imitatrix (Cockerell & Porter, 1899)^{i c g}
- Tetraloniella incana LaBerge, 2001^{i c g}
- Tetraloniella inermis (Friese, 1911)^{i c g}
- Tetraloniella inulae (Tkalcu, 1979)^{i c g}
- Tetraloniella jaliscoensis LaBerge, 2001^{i c g}
- Tetraloniella julliani (Pérez, 1879)^{i c g}
- Tetraloniella junodi (Friese, 1909)^{i c g}
- Tetraloniella karooensis (Brauns, 1926)^{i c g}
- Tetraloniella katangensis (Cockerell, 1930)^{i c g}
- Tetraloniella keiseri (Benoist, 1962)^{i c g}
- Tetraloniella lanzarotensis (Tkalcu, 1993)^{i c g}
- Tetraloniella lippiae (Cockerell, 1904)^{i c b}
- Tetraloniella longifellator (LaBerge, 1957)^{i c g}
- Tetraloniella lyncea (Mocsáry, 1879)^{i c g}
- Tetraloniella madecassa (Benoist, 1962)^{i c g}
- Tetraloniella michaelseni (Friese, 1916)^{i c g}
- Tetraloniella michoacanensis LaBerge, 2001^{i c g}
- Tetraloniella minuta (Friese, 1905)^{i c g}
- Tetraloniella minuticornis (Friese, 1905)^{i c g}
- Tetraloniella minutilla LaBerge, 2001^{i c g}
- Tetraloniella nana (Morawitz, 1874)^{i c g}
- Tetraloniella nanula (Cockerell, 1932)^{i c g}
- Tetraloniella nigricans (Cockerell, 1932)^{i c g}
- Tetraloniella nigriceps (Morawitz, 1895)^{i c}
- Tetraloniella noguera LaBerge, 2001^{i c g}
- Tetraloniella nostra (Cockerell, 1933)^{i c g}
- Tetraloniella nursei Cockerell, 1922^{i c g}
- Tetraloniella nyassana (Strand, 1911)^{i c g}
- Tetraloniella ochraea LaBerge, 2001^{i c g}
- Tetraloniella ogilviae (Cockerell, 1935)^{i c g}
- Tetraloniella ottiliensis (Friese, 1905)^{i c g}
- Tetraloniella pachysoma (Cockerell, 1920)^{i c g}
- Tetraloniella paenalbata LaBerge, 2001^{i c g}
- Tetraloniella paulyi Eardley, 2001^{i c g}
- Tetraloniella pennata LaBerge, 2001^{i c g}
- Tetraloniella perconcinna (Cockerell, 1949)^{i c g}
- Tetraloniella pomonae (Cockerell, 1915)^{i c g b}
- Tetraloniella ruficornis (Fabricius, 1804)^{i c g}
- Tetraloniella salicariae (Lepeletier, 1841)^{i c g}
- Tetraloniella salviae (LaBerge, 1989)^{i c g}
- Tetraloniella scabiosae (Mocsáry, 1881)^{i c g}
- Tetraloniella sierranila Eardley, 1989^{i c g}
- Tetraloniella silacea LaBerge, 2001^{i c g}
- Tetraloniella simpsoni (Meade-Waldo, 1914)^{i c g}
- Tetraloniella sjoestedti (Friese, 1909)^{i c g}
- Tetraloniella snizeki (Tkalcu, 2003)^{i c g}
- Tetraloniella sphaeralceae LaBerge, 2001^{i c g}
- Tetraloniella spissa (Cresson, 1872)^{i c g}
- Tetraloniella strigata (Lepeletier, 1841)^{i c g}
- Tetraloniella tenuifasciata (Friese, 1911)^{i c}
- Tetraloniella tethepa Eardley, 2001^{i c g}
- Tetraloniella trabeata LaBerge, 2001^{i c g}
- Tetraloniella trimera (Risch, 2001)^{i c g}
- Tetraloniella vandykei LaBerge, 2001^{i c g}
- Tetraloniella vansoni (Cockerell, 1935)^{i c g}
- Tetraloniella viator (Cockerell, 1911)^{i c g}
- Tetraloniella watmoughi Eardley, 1989^{i c g}
- Tetraloniella whiteheadi Eardley, 1989^{i c g}
- Tetraloniella wilmattae (Cockerell, 1917)^{i c g}
- Tetraloniella yanega LaBerge, 2001^{i c g}

Data sources: i = ITIS, c = Catalogue of Life, g = GBIF, b = Bugguide.net
