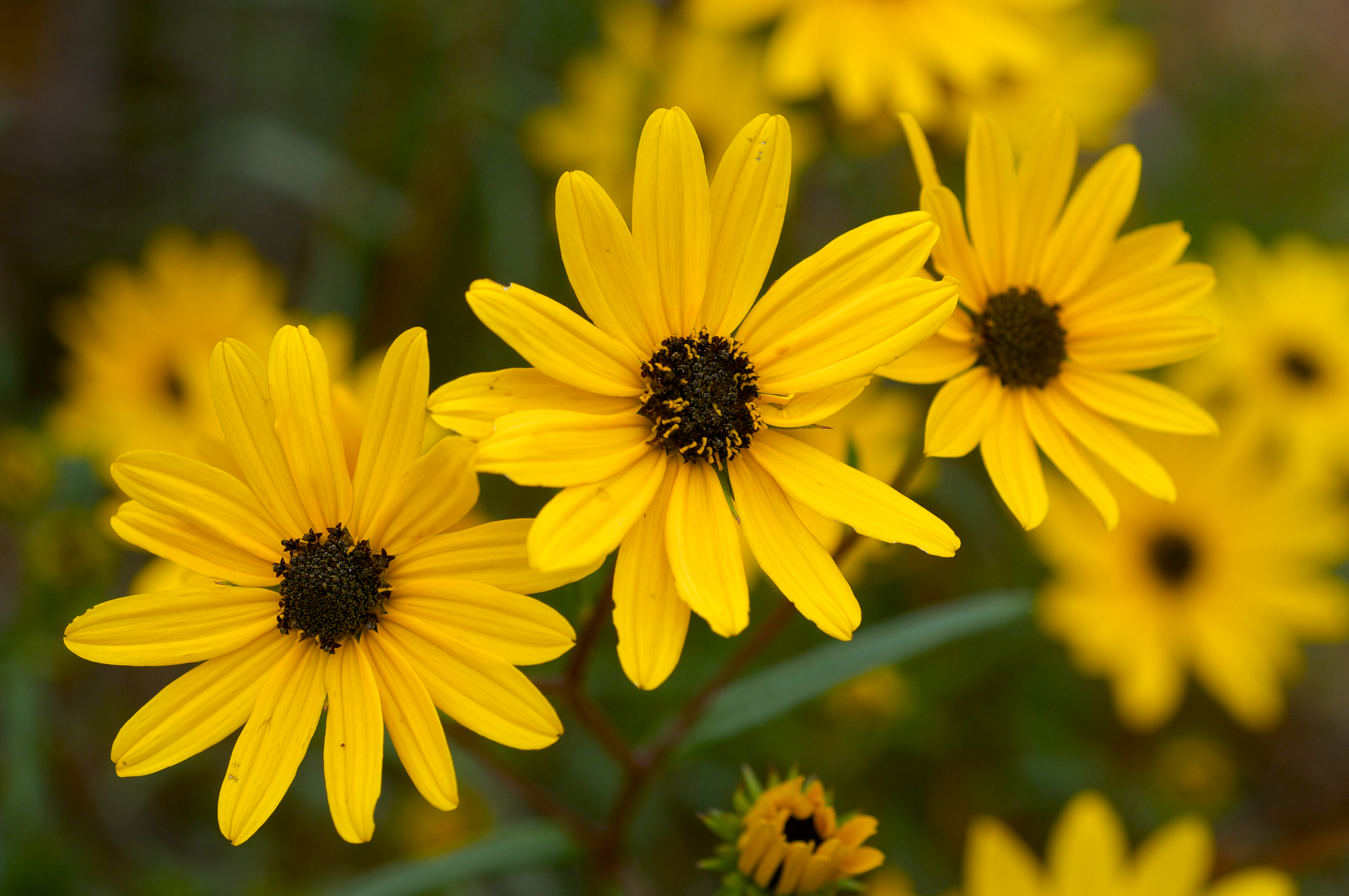

Conservation status
- Secure (NatureServe)

Scientific classification
- Kingdom: Plantae
- Clade: Tracheophytes
- Clade: Angiosperms
- Clade: Eudicots
- Clade: Asterids
- Order: Asterales
- Family: Asteraceae
- Tribe: Heliantheae
- Genus: Helianthus
- Species: H. angustifolius

Binomial name
- Helianthus angustifolius L.

Synonyms
- Coreopsis angustifolia L. 1753 not Ait. 1789; Discomela angustifolius Raf.

= Helianthus angustifolius =

Species of sunflower

Helianthus angustifolius is a species of sunflower known by the common name narrowleaf sunflower or swamp sunflower. It is native to the south-central and eastern United States, found in all the coastal states from Texas to Long Island, and inland as far as Missouri. It is typically found in the coastal plain habitat (both the Atlantic and Gulf), particularly in wet areas. Although, in general, this species prefers low, moist ground, it is tolerant of conditions varying from bogs and swamps near sea level to relatively dry, well drained, gravelly clay. It is not particularly drought resistant.

Helianthus angustifolius is often cultivated for its bright, showy yellow flowers. Leaves are long and narrow, up to 15 centimetres (5.9 in) long. It is a perennial herb sometimes as much as 150 centimetres (59 in) tall. One plant can produce 3-16 flower heads, each with 10-20 ray florets surrounding at least 75 disc florets.

== Ecology ==
Helianthus angustifolius is insect pollinated and is recorded to have been visited in northern Florida by Agapostemon splendens, Andrena accepta, Augochloropsis metallica, Augochloropsis sumptuosa, Bombus bimaculatus, Bombus impatiens, Dieunomia heteropoda, Epeolus lectoides, Halictus poeyi/ligatus, Lasioglossum pectorale, Megachile mendica, Megachile pseudobrevis, Melissodes boltoniae, Melissodes dentiventris, Melissodes druriellus, Melissodes trinodis, Paranthidium jugatorium, Perdita bequaerti, Pseudopanurgus rugosus, Pseudopanurgus solidaginus, and Svastra aegis.
