= Danúncia Urban =

Brazilian entomologist

- Born: May 13, 1933 (age 93); Curitiba, Brazil
- Scientific career
- Fields: Entomology
- Workplaces: Universidade Federal do Paraná

Danúncia Urban (born 13 May 1933) is a Brazilian entomologist who has specialized in the study of neotropical bees particularly those in the tribes Eucerini and Anthidiini. She has described nearly 330 new taxa. She is an emeritus professor at the Universidade Federal do Paraná, where she taught for decades.

Urban was born in Curitiba in a family of Polish origin, her father Felix Urban (1910–1989) had come from Tarnopol to Brazil in the 1920s. Her mother Maria Victoria Dolinski (1909–1974) was from Krakow. At school she initially studied in Polish and then in Portuguese. Thanks to her mother's suggestion, fearing that her daughter would face competition from men, she took natural history majors rather than her own choice of medicine at the Faculdade de Filosofia, Ciências e Letras do Paraná which was part of the Universidade do Paraná. She took a special interest in zoology and was encouraged by Father Jesus Santiago Moure. He invited her to study the birds of the families Falconidae and Columbidae from 1953 to 1959 at the Museu Paranaense. She worked on morphometrics to develop taxonomic keys. She also assisted Father Moure in coursework and laboratory teaching. In her spare time she began to examine bees and her first published work was on the genus Thygater. In 1965 she applied for a position and became a lecturer on the chordates and later on the invertebrates. She started a course in insect morphology in 1968 and soon the first graduate program in entomology in Brazil was established in 1969. Alongside coursework and teaching, she also conducted taxonomic studies on the entomological collections, largely put together by Father Moure, for which she was curator from 1982 to 1984. She retired in 1991 but continues to work. She never received a formal doctorate but in 1995 she received an honorary doctorate from the Universidade Federal do Paraná.

Urban described 15 new genera and 128 species in the Anthidiini. She also studied the cephalic muscles of bees in the subfamilies Andreninae, Apinae, Colletinae, Halictinae and Megachilinae. She also worked on a parasitic hymenoptera in collaboration with Luis DeSantis and Vinalto Graf. With Bernadete Lucas de Oliveira she worked on the lepidoptera.
