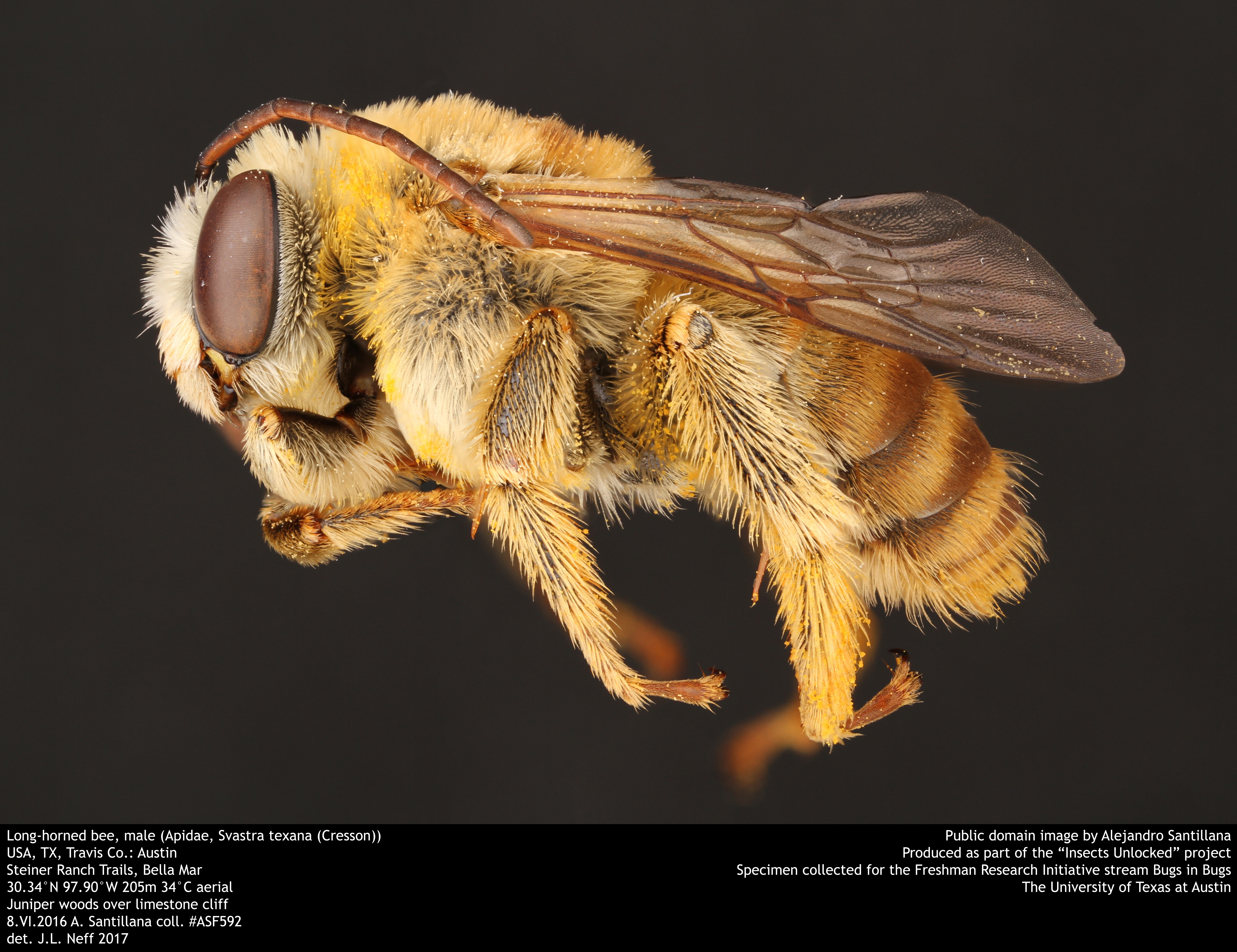

Scientific classification
- Domain: Eukaryota
- Kingdom: Animalia
- Phylum: Arthropoda
- Class: Insecta
- Order: Hymenoptera
- Family: Apidae
- Genus: Svastra
- Species: S. texana

Binomial name
- Svastra texana (Cresson, 1872)

= Svastra texana =

Species of bee

Svastra texana is a species of long-horned bee in the family Apidae. It is found in Central America and North America.

== Subspecies ==
These two subspecies belong to the species Svastra texana:

- Svastra texana eluta (LaBerge, 1956)
- Svastra texana texana (Cresson, 1872)
