= Svastra sabinensis =

Scientific classification
- Kingdom: Animalia
- Phylum: Arthropoda
- Class: Insecta
- Order: Hymenoptera
- Family: Apidae
- Genus: Svastra
- Species: S. sabinensis

Binomial name
- Svastra sabinensis (Cockerell, 1924)

Species of bee

Svastra sabinensis is a species of long-horned bee in the family Apidae. It is found in Central America and North America.

== Subspecies ==
These three subspecies belong to the species Svastra sabinensis:

- Svastra sabinensis laterufa Cockerell, 1934
- Svastra sabinensis nubila (LaBerge, 1956)
- Svastra sabinensis sabinensis (Cockerell, 1924)
