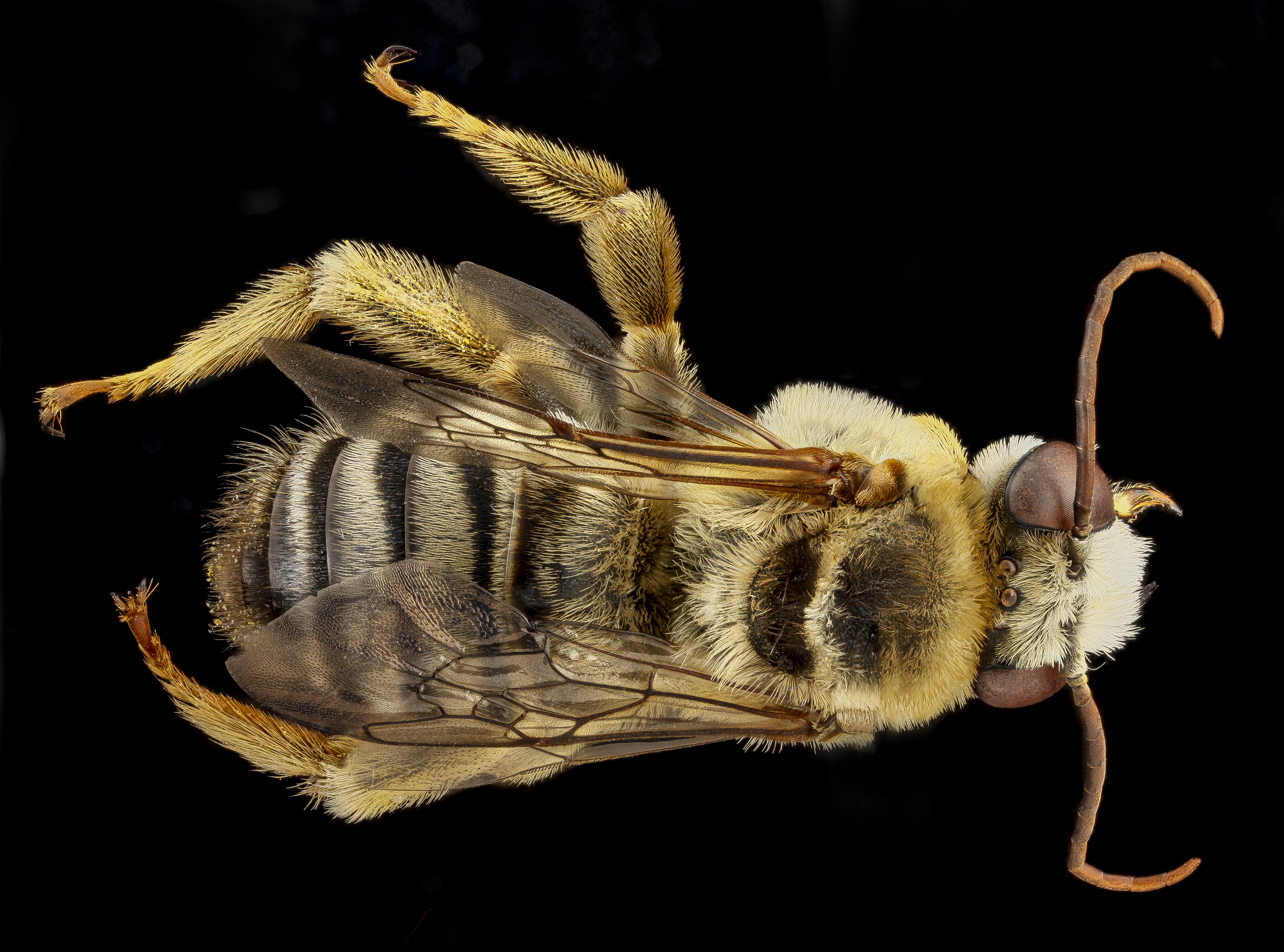

Scientific classification
- Domain: Eukaryota
- Kingdom: Animalia
- Phylum: Arthropoda
- Class: Insecta
- Order: Hymenoptera
- Family: Apidae
- Genus: Svastra
- Species: S. petulca

Binomial name
- Svastra petulca (Cresson, 1878)

= Svastra petulca =

Species of bee

Svastra petulca is a species of long-horned bee in the family Apidae. It is found in Central America and North America.

== Subspecies ==
These two subspecies belong to the species Svastra petulca:

- Svastra petulca petulca (Cresson, 1878)
- Svastra petulca suffusa (Cresson, 1878)
