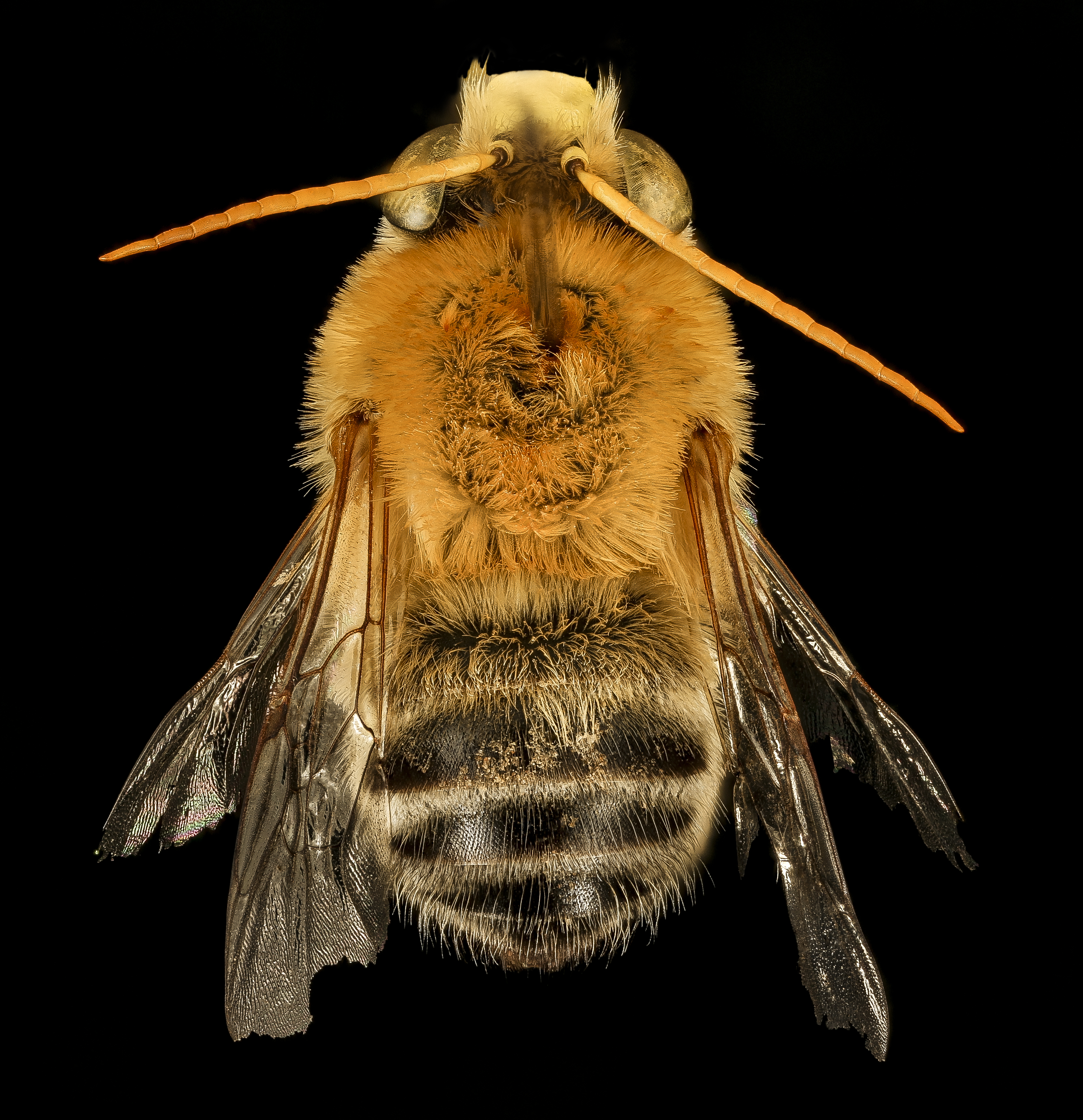

Scientific classification
- Kingdom: Animalia
- Phylum: Arthropoda
- Class: Insecta
- Order: Hymenoptera
- Family: Apidae
- Tribe: Eucerini
- Genus: Martinapis
- Species: M. luteicornis

Binomial name
- Martinapis luteicornis (Cockerell, 1896)

= Martinapis luteicornis =

Species of bee

Martinapis luteicornis, the yellow-horned morning long-horned bee, is a species of long-horned bee in the family Apidae. It is found in Central America and North America.

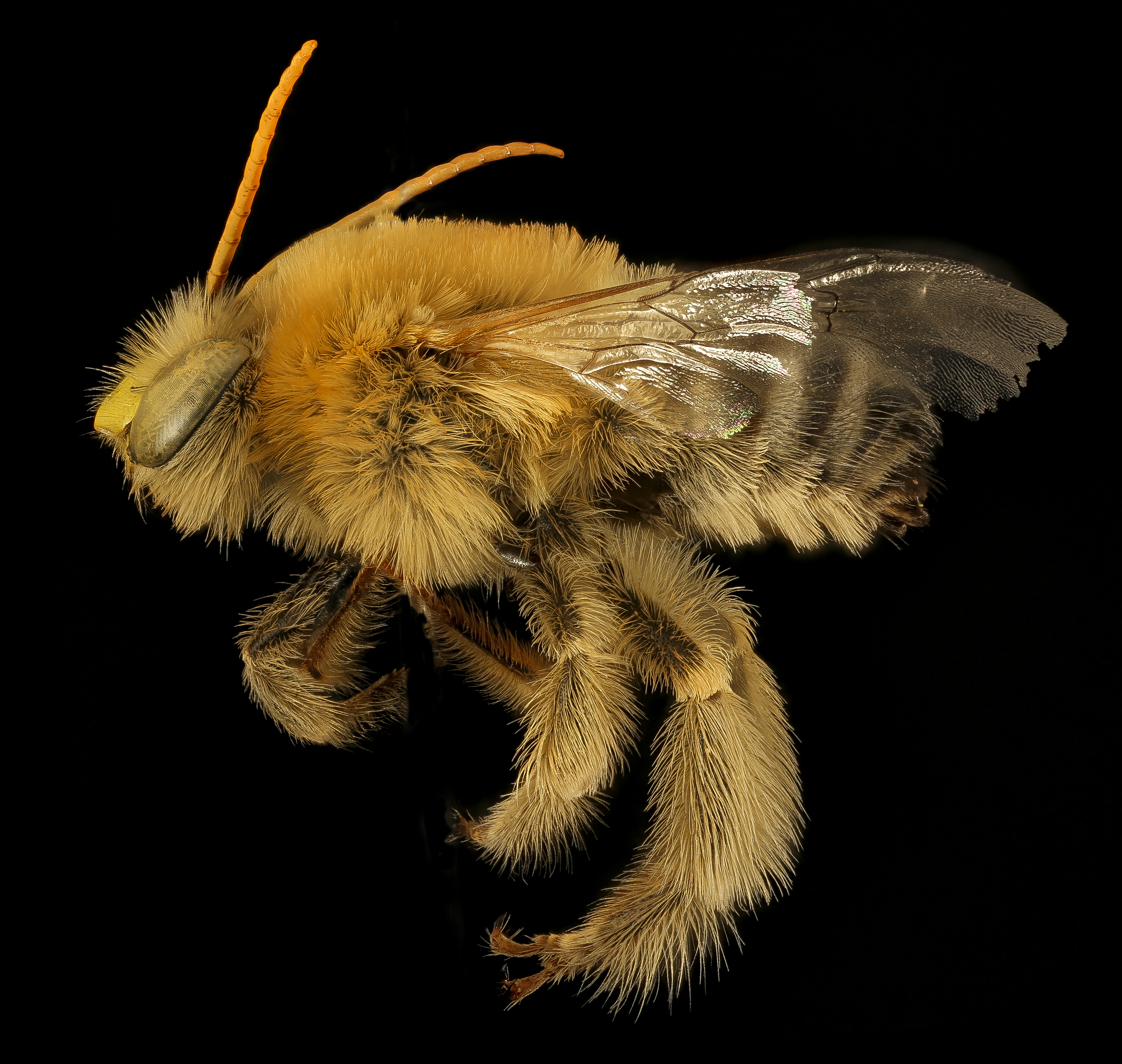
Yellow-horned morning long-horned bee, Martinapis luteicornis
