= Tetraloniella albata =

Scientific classification
- Domain: Eukaryota
- Kingdom: Animalia
- Phylum: Arthropoda
- Class: Insecta
- Order: Hymenoptera
- Family: Apidae
- Genus: Tetraloniella
- Species: T. albata

Binomial name
- Tetraloniella albata (Cresson, 1872)

Species of bee

Tetraloniella albata is a species of long-horned bee in the family Apidae. It is found in North America.
