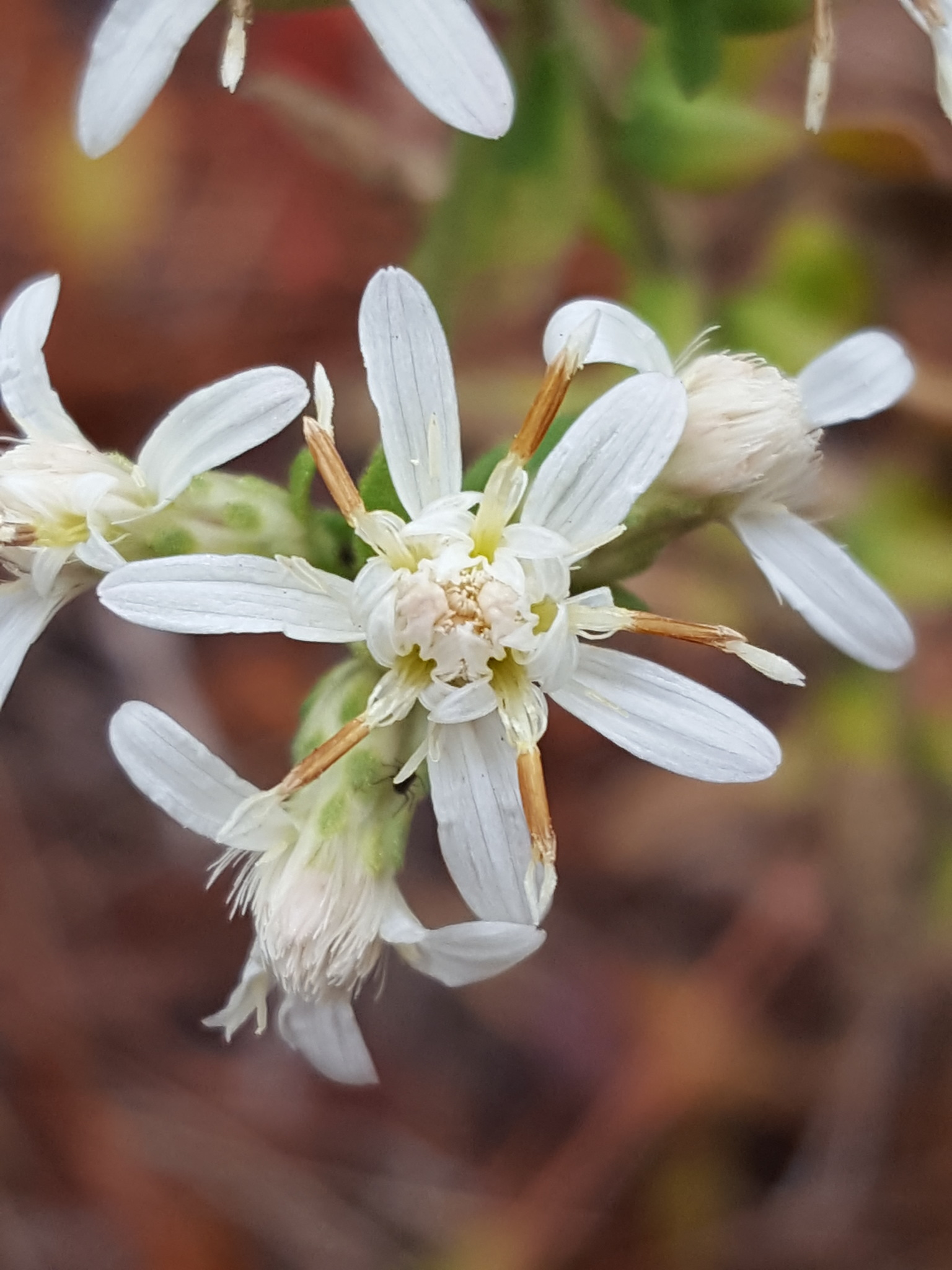

Scientific classification
- Kingdom: Plantae
- Clade: Embryophytes
- Clade: Tracheophytes
- Clade: Spermatophytes
- Clade: Angiosperms
- Clade: Eudicots
- Clade: Asterids
- Order: Asterales
- Family: Asteraceae
- Genus: Sericocarpus
- Species: S. tortifolius

Binomial name
- Sericocarpus tortifolius (Michx.) Nees

= Sericocarpus tortifolius =

Species of plant

Sericocarpus tortifolius, commonly known as the Dixie whitetop aster or the twisted-leaf white-topped aster, is a perennial forb in the family Asteraceae that is endemic to the southeastern United States.

== Description ==
Sericocarpus tortifolius grows 33–117 cm tall, with erect, hairy stems. The lower and basal leaves typically wither by the time of flowering, while the upper (cauline) leaves are sessile. Leaf blades are obovate, 10–40 mm long and 3–10 mm wide, with entire margins and pointed to slightly tipped ends. Both leaf surfaces are hairy and resinous. Flower heads occur in clusters of 2–4 per branch, arranged in flat-topped (corymbiform) arrays. Bracts on the flower stalks are broad and hairy, ranging from lance-shaped to ovate. The involucre is 5–8 mm long, with phyllaries in 4–5 overlapping rows, increasing in size inward (outer 2–3 mm, inner up to 6 mm), and lightly hairy. Each head contains 2–5 ray florets with corolla tubes 3–4 mm long and rays 3–6 mm, along with 6–11 disc florets with 4–6 mm tubes and 1–2 mm lobes. The ovaries are spindle-shaped to obconic (1–3 mm), densely covered in stiff hairs, and topped with a pappus of fine bristles 6–8 mm long.

== Distribution and habitat ==
Sericocarpus tortifolius is distributed from eastern North Carolina south to South Florida and west to eastern Louisiana. It is mostly restricted to the Coastal Plain, but is found inland on hard-rock provinces in north-central Georgia and north-central Alabama. It grows in dry to mesic longleaf pine sandhills, mesic to scrubby flatwoods, and other dry woodlands.

== Ecology ==
Sericocarpus tortifolius is insect pollinated and is recorded to have been visited in northern Florida by Augochloropsis metallica, Augochloropsis sumptuosa, Bombus bimaculatus, Bombus griseocollis, Bombus impatiens, Coelioxys sayi, Lasioglossum apopkense, Lasioglossum reticulatum, Megachile albitarsis, Melissodes bimaculatus, Melissodes dentiventris, Nomia nortoni, and Perdita bishoppi. .
