= Syntrichalonia exquisita =

Scientific classification
- Domain: Eukaryota
- Kingdom: Animalia
- Phylum: Arthropoda
- Class: Insecta
- Order: Hymenoptera
- Family: Apidae
- Genus: Syntrichalonia
- Species: S. exquisita

Binomial name
- Syntrichalonia exquisita (Cresson, 1878)

Species of bee

Syntrichalonia exquisita is a species of long-horned bee in the family Apidae. It is found in Central America and North America.
