= Tetraloniella lippiae =

Scientific classification
- Kingdom: Animalia
- Phylum: Arthropoda
- Class: Insecta
- Order: Hymenoptera
- Family: Apidae
- Tribe: Eucerini
- Genus: Tetraloniella
- Species: T. lippiae

Binomial name
- Tetraloniella lippiae (Cockerell, 1904)

Species of bee

Tetraloniella lippiae is a species of long-horned bee in the family Apidae.
