= Martinapis occidentalis =

Scientific classification
- Domain: Eukaryota
- Kingdom: Animalia
- Phylum: Arthropoda
- Class: Insecta
- Order: Hymenoptera
- Family: Apidae
- Tribe: Eucerini
- Genus: Martinapis
- Species: M. occidentalis

Binomial name
- Martinapis occidentalis Zavortink & LaBerge, 1976

Species of bee

Martinapis occidentalis, the western morning long-horned bee, is a species of long-horned bee in the family Apidae. It is found in Central America and North America.
