= Tetraloniella pomonae =

Scientific classification
- Kingdom: Animalia
- Phylum: Arthropoda
- Class: Insecta
- Order: Hymenoptera
- Family: Apidae
- Tribe: Eucerini
- Genus: Tetraloniella
- Species: T. pomonae

Binomial name
- Tetraloniella pomonae (Cockerell, 1915)

Species of bee

Tetraloniella pomonae is a species of long-horned bee in the family Apidae. It is found in Central America and North America.
