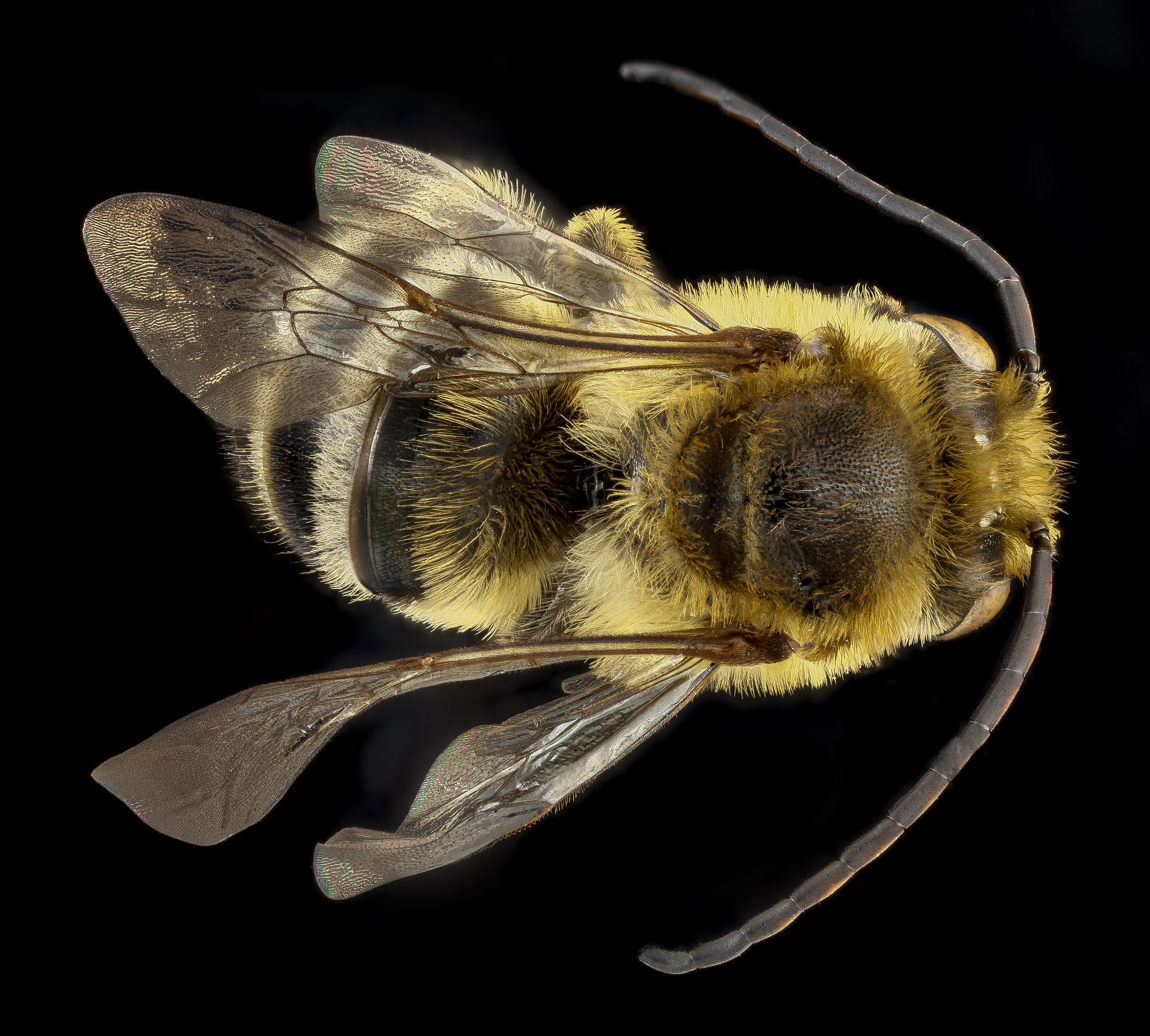

Scientific classification
- Domain: Eukaryota
- Kingdom: Animalia
- Phylum: Arthropoda
- Class: Insecta
- Order: Hymenoptera
- Family: Apidae
- Genus: Florilegus
- Species: F. condignus

Binomial name
- Florilegus condignus (Cresson, 1878)

= Florilegus condignus =

Species of bee

Florilegus condignus is a species of long-horned bee in the family Apidae. It is found in the Caribbean Sea, Central America, and North America. It is an uncommon species in general but may be locally common near wetlands containing pickerelweed. It is often mistaken for species of the genus Melissodes.
