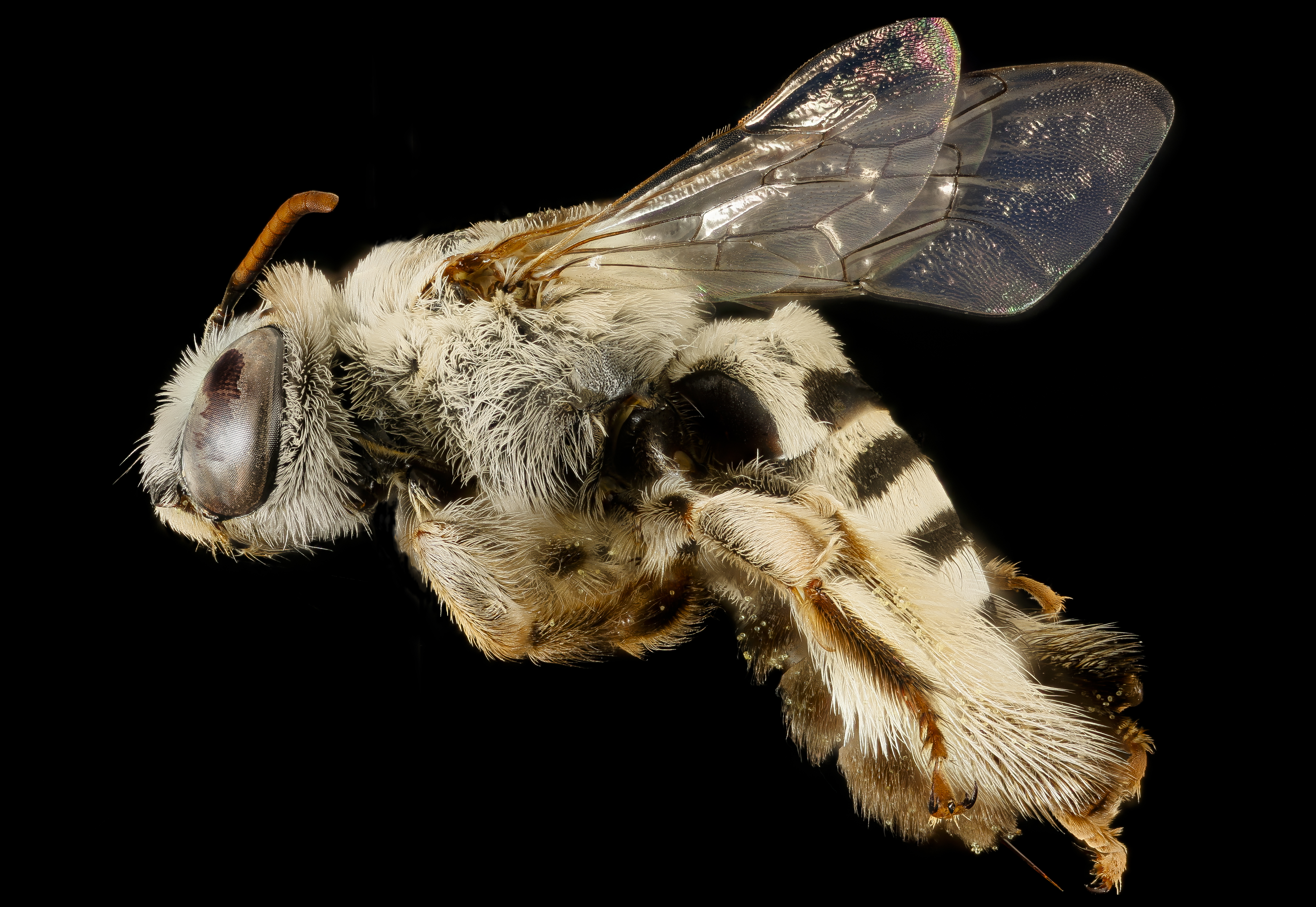

Scientific classification
- Kingdom: Animalia
- Phylum: Arthropoda
- Class: Insecta
- Order: Hymenoptera
- Family: Apidae
- Tribe: Eucerini
- Genus: Svastra
- Species: S. duplocincta

Binomial name
- Svastra duplocincta (Cockerell, 1905)

= Svastra duplocincta =

Species of bee

Svastra duplocincta is a species of long-horned bee in the family Apidae. It is found in Central America and North America.
