= Tetraloniella eriocarpi =

Scientific classification
- Kingdom: Animalia
- Phylum: Arthropoda
- Class: Insecta
- Order: Hymenoptera
- Family: Apidae
- Genus: Tetraloniella
- Species: T. eriocarpi

Binomial name
- Tetraloniella eriocarpi (Cockerell, 1898)

Species of bee

Tetraloniella eriocarpi is a species of long-horned bee in the family Apidae. It is found in Central America and North America.
