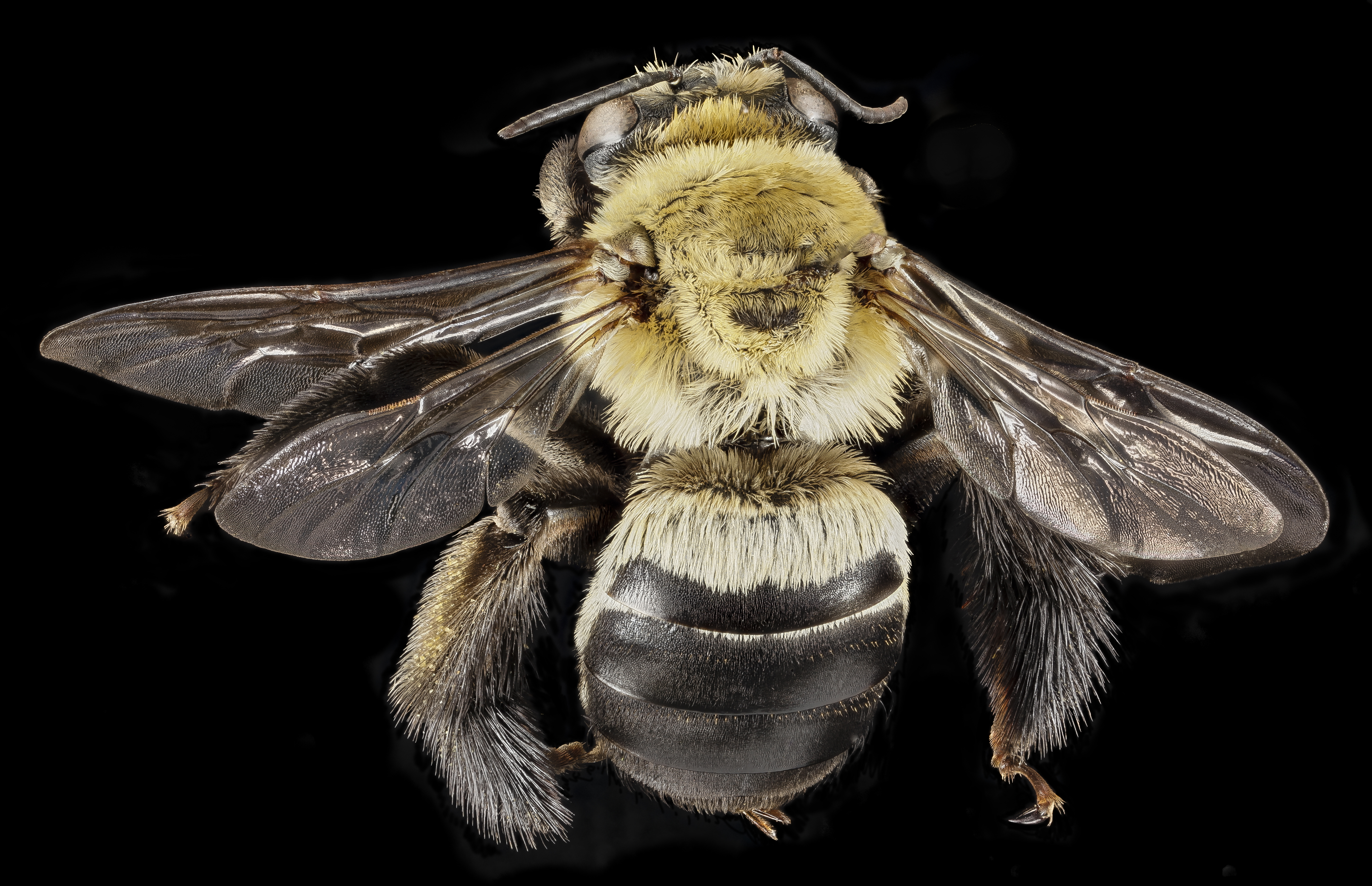

Scientific classification
- Domain: Eukaryota
- Kingdom: Animalia
- Phylum: Arthropoda
- Class: Insecta
- Order: Hymenoptera
- Family: Apidae
- Genus: Svastra
- Species: S. atripes

Binomial name
- Svastra atripes (Cresson, 1872)

= Svastra atripes =

Species of bee

Svastra atripes is a species of long-horned bee in the family Apidae. It is found in North America.

== Subspecies ==
These three subspecies belong to the species Svastra atripes:

- Svastra atripes atrimitra (LaBerge, 1956)
- Svastra atripes atripes (Cresson, 1872)
- Svastra atripes georgica (Cresson, 1878)
