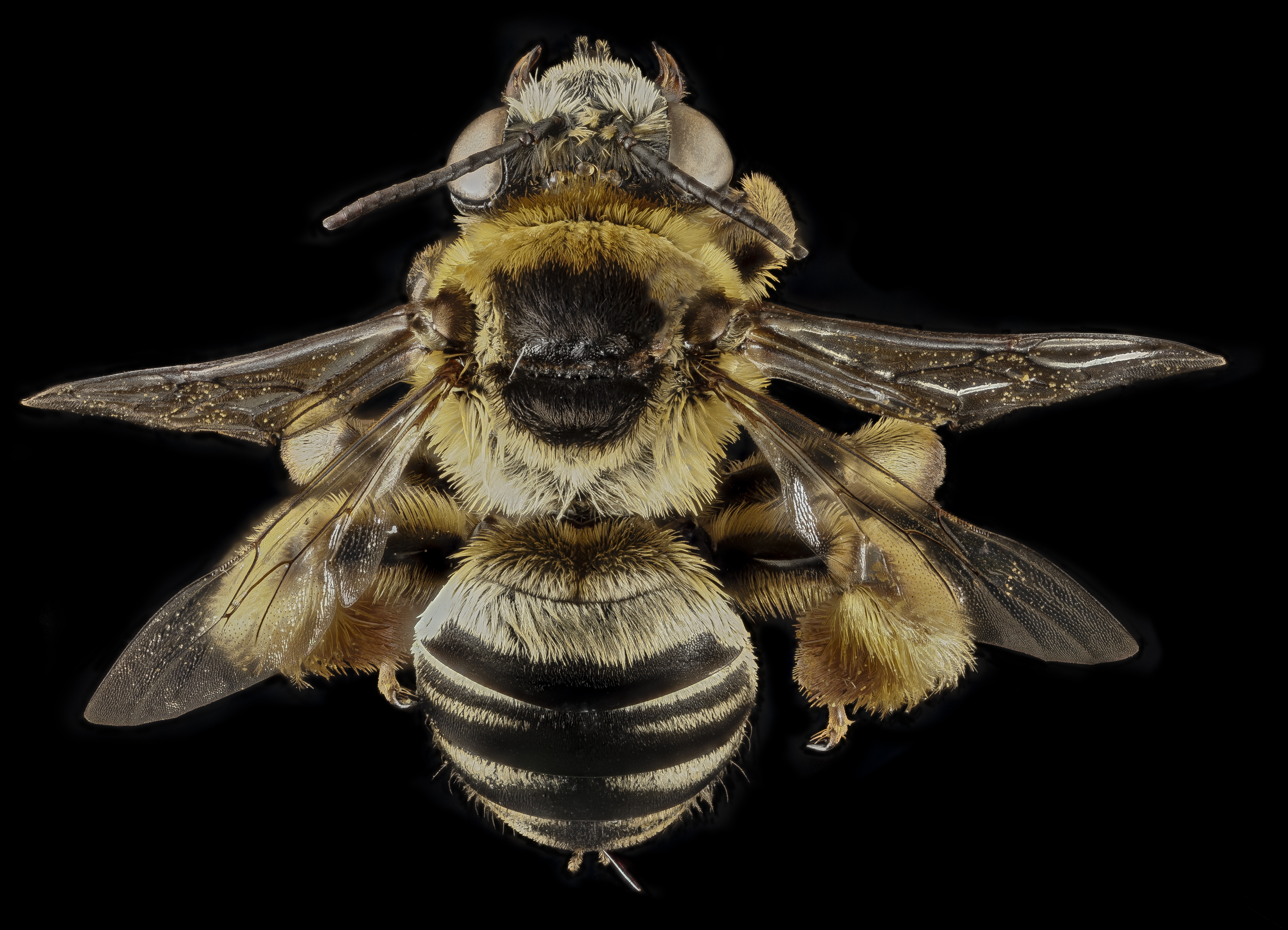
- Svastra aegis

Scientific classification
- Domain: Eukaryota
- Kingdom: Animalia
- Phylum: Arthropoda
- Class: Insecta
- Order: Hymenoptera
- Family: Apidae
- Tribe: Eucerini
- Genus: Svastra; Holmberg, 1884

= Svastra =

Genus of bees

Svastra is a genus of long-horned bees in the family Apidae. There are at least 20 described species in Svastra.

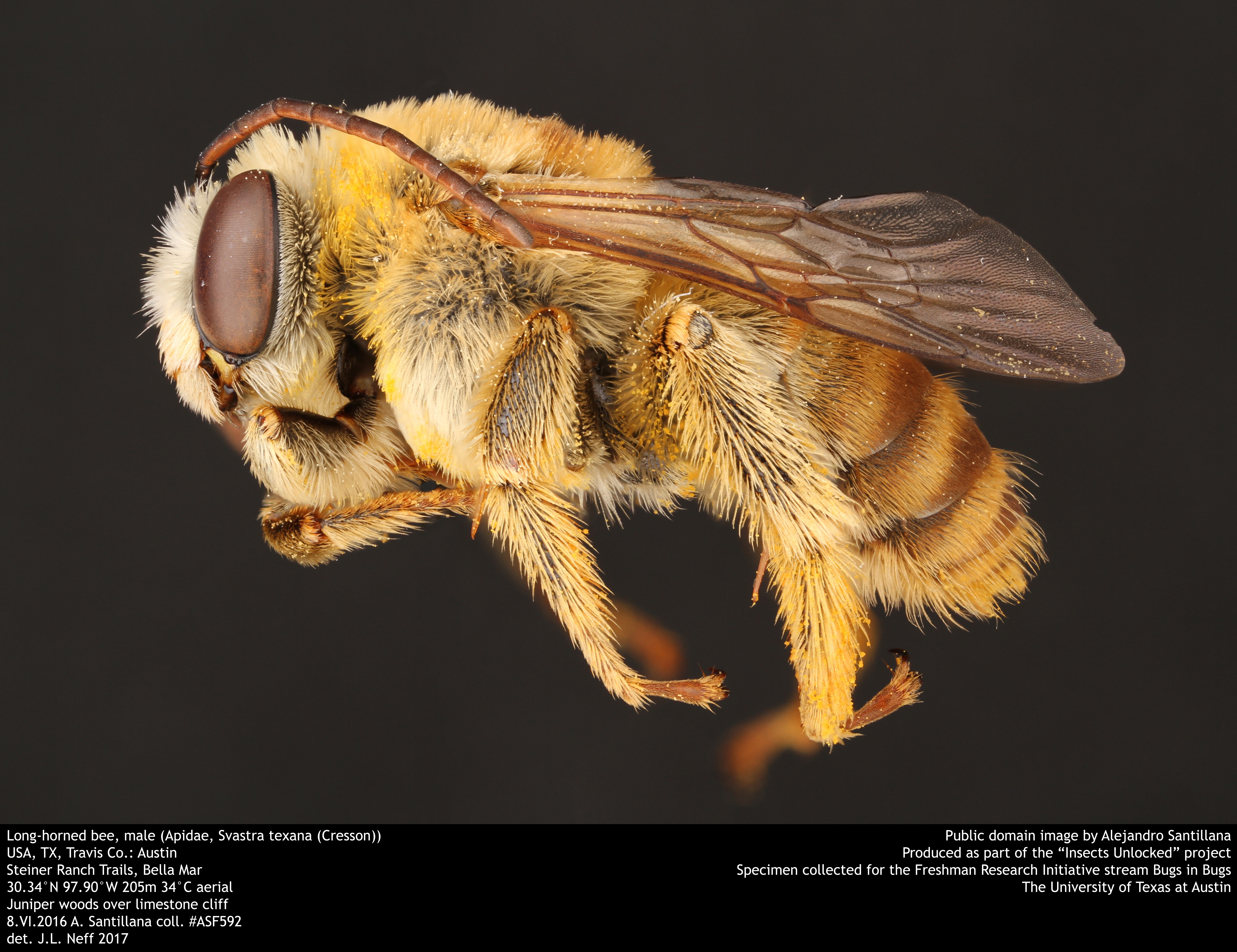
Svastra texana

== Species ==
These 23 species belong to the genus Svastra:

- Svastra aegis (LaBerge, 1956)
- Svastra albocollaris (Cockerell, 1918)
- Svastra atripes (Cresson, 1872)
- Svastra comanche (Cresson, 1872)
- Svastra compta (Cresson, 1878)
- Svastra cressonii (Dalla Torre, 1896)
- Svastra detecta Holmberg, 1884
- Svastra duplocincta (Cockerell, 1905)
- Svastra flavitarsis (Spinola, 1851)
- Svastra friesei LaBerge, 1958
- Svastra grandissima (Cockerell, 1905)
- Svastra helianthelli (Cockerell, 1905)
- Svastra machaerantherae (Cockerell, 1904)
- Svastra maculata Urban, 1998
- Svastra minima (LaBerge, 1956)
- Svastra nevadensis (Cresson, 1874)
- Svastra nitida (LaBerge, 1956)
- Svastra obliqua (Say, 1837) (sunflower bee)
- Svastra pallidior LaBerge, 1963
- Svastra petulca (Cresson, 1878)
- Svastra sabinensis (Cockerell, 1924)
- Svastra sila (LaBerge, 1956)
- Svastra texana (Cresson, 1872)
