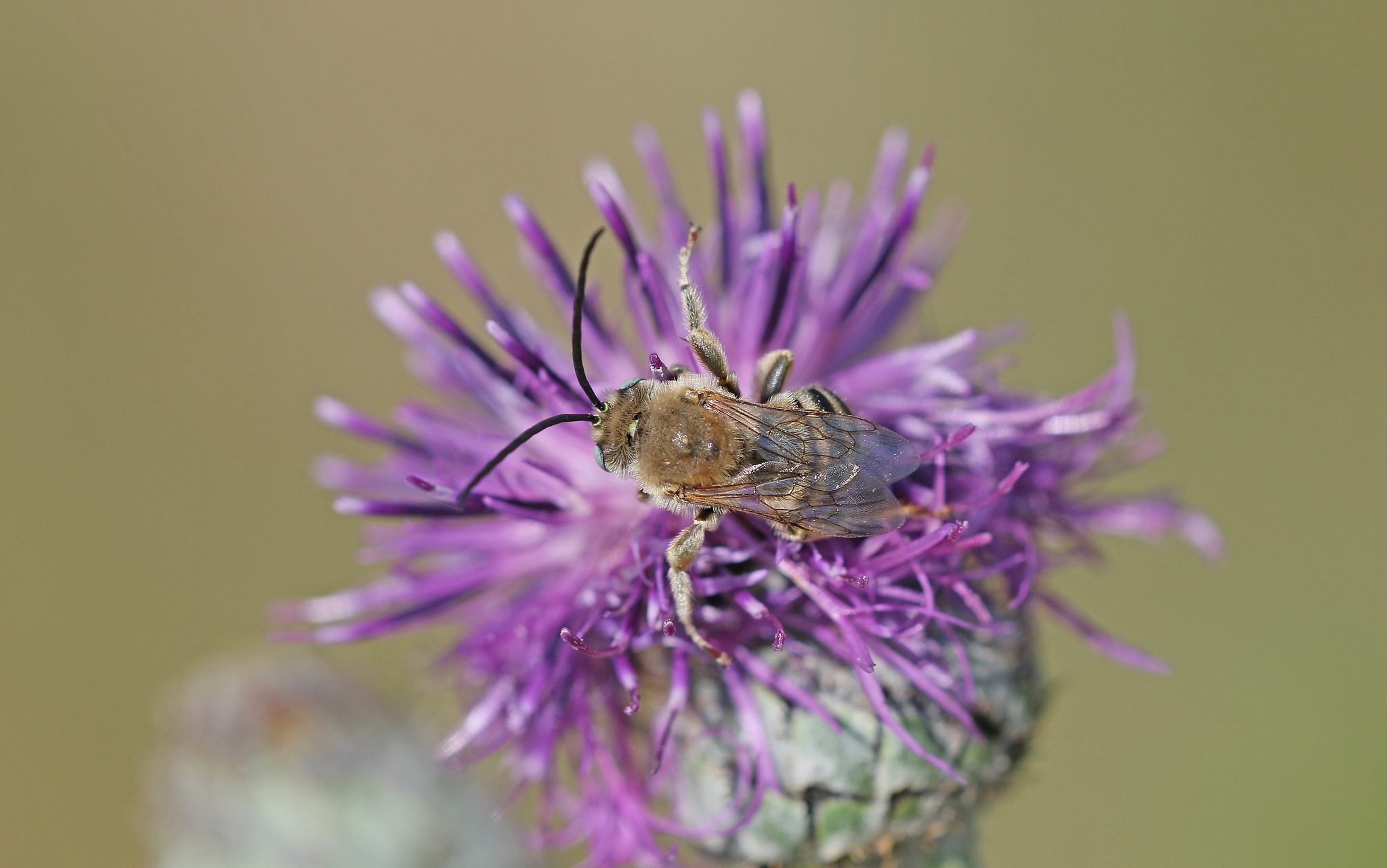
- Tetraloniella dentata, Neusiedl am See, Burgenland, Austria, June 2021

Scientific classification
- Domain: Eukaryota
- Kingdom: Animalia
- Phylum: Arthropoda
- Class: Insecta
- Order: Hymenoptera
- Family: Apidae
- Genus: Tetraloniella
- Species: T. dentata

Binomial name
- Tetraloniella dentata (Germar, 1839)

= Tetraloniella dentata =

Species of bee

Tetraloniella dentata (also called dentate longhorn) is a species of bees within the genus Tetraloniella.

== Description ==
This species measures from 12 to 14 mm. The males are similar to the females, but have significantly longer antennae. The clypeus is yellow. Females have rust-red hair on the mesonotum. The edge of the tergite is wide, smooth and shiny.

== Range ==
Tetraloniella dentata occurs in North Africa from Morocco to Tunisia. In Eurasia it occurs from Portugal via southern and central Europe, Asia Minor, Levant and Caucasus to Central Asia; north to the Baltic States, in Russia to Kirov and Perm; south to Sicily, Greece, Israel and Northern Iran. In North Africa in the ssp. atlantis (TKALCU, 1998) occurs and in Sardinia in the ssp. amseli (ALFKEN, 1938). Pakistan hosts the ssp. macrozona COCKERELL, described in 1922, from Mongolia the ssp. extrema (TKALCU, 1998) has been described. In Germany this species is currently only recorded from Brandenburg, historically from Mecklenburg-Western Pomerania, Saxony-Anhalt, Hesse and Thuringia. In Germany the species used to be distributed further south, but there it has disappeared and can only be found in the northeast German lowlands. It is very rare here. It is also reported from Austria from Burgenland and Lower Austria. Currently it is found in Switzerland from Valais and historical it was reported from Ticino and Misox.

== Habitat ==
The species is found in dry and warm locations, vineyards, fallow and ruderal areas, sand and clay pits, steep banks. From the lowlands to the montane elevation. In Germany this species can be found in the large sandy areas north of the low mountain range, e.g. in the Döberitzer Heide. There it uses sandy, dry and warm ruderal spots, where it creates nests on, among other things, south-facing embankments with a sandy subsoil.

== Ecology ==
Tetraloniella dentata is an univoltine species. It flies from July to September. It is an oligolectic species specializing in Asteraceae, especially Cardueae. Pollen sources are mainly Centaurea stoebe, but also Centaurea scabiosa, Carduus acanthoides and Onopordum acanthium.

Tetraloniella dentata nests in self-dug cavities in the earth. Nests are in bare or sparsely overgrown soil, flat to sloping surfaces in self-dug corridors. The nest structure is similar to that of Eucera macroglossa. The brood cells are at a depth of 12 cm and more. The nest entrance is surrounded by a tumulus. The nest consists of a usually branched main passage. The preferred substrate is sand, loess or loess clay, which can also be compacted.

Ammobates vinctus and Triepeolus tristis are given as cuckoo bees.

== Etymology ==
From Latin "dentata" = "toothed, with teeth"; the tergites 5 and 6 of the males each have a tooth-like extension on the side.

== Taxonomy ==
Subgenus Tetraloniella ASHMEAD, 1899.

Synonyms: Tetralonia dentata (GERMAR, 1839); Eucera dentata GERMAR, 1839.
