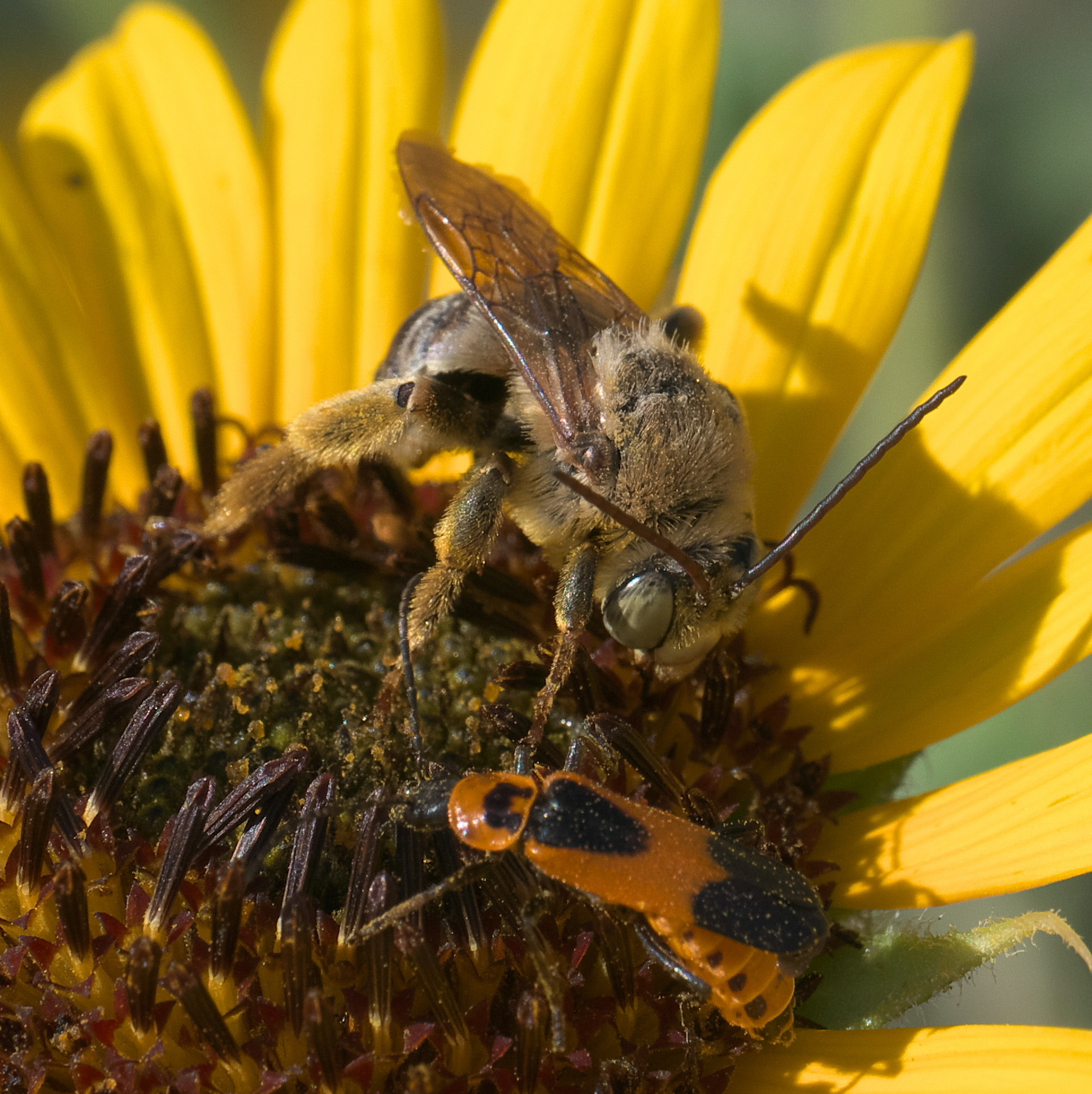
- Epimelissodes obliquus, Nebraska

Scientific classification
- Kingdom: Animalia
- Phylum: Arthropoda
- Class: Insecta
- Order: Hymenoptera
- Family: Apidae
- Tribe: Eucerini
- Genus: Epimelissodes; Ashmead, 1899

= Epimelissodes =

Genus of bees

Epimelissodes is a genus of long-horned bees in the family Apidae found in North America.

== Taxonomy and phylogeny ==
These species were previously classified within the genus Svastra Holmberg, 1884; however, recent genomic focused studies, such as Freitas et al., 2023, have increasingly demonstrated their distinction as separate genera.

== Species ==
There are 20 species of Epimelissodes:

=== Subgenus Anthedonia Michener, 1942 ===
- Epimelissodes comptus (Cresson, 1878)
- Epimelissodes nevadensis (Cresson, 1874)

=== Subgenus Brachymelissodes LaBerge, 1956 ===
- Epimelissodes cressonii (Dalla Torre, 1896)
- Epimelissodes minima (LaBerge, 1956)

=== Subgenus Epimelissodes Ashmead, 1899 ===
- Epimelissodes aegis (LaBerge, 1956)
- Epimelissodes albocollaris (Cockerell, 1918)
- Epimelissodes atripes (Cresson, 1872)
- Epimelissodes comanche (Cresson, 1872)
- Epimelissodes friesei LaBerge, 1958
- Epimelissodes grandissimus (Cockerell, 1905)
- Epimelissodes helianthelli (Cockerell, 1905)
- Epimelissodes machaerantherae (Cockerell, 1904)
- Epimelissodes nitidus (LaBerge, 1956)
- Epimelissodes obliquus (Say, 1837)
- Epimelissodes pallidior LaBerge, 1963
- Epimelissodes petulcus (Cresson, 1879)
- Epimelissodes sabinensis (Cockerell, 1924
- Epimelissodes sila (LaBerge, 1956)
- Epimelissodes texanus (Cresson, 1872)

=== Subgenus Idiomelissodes LaBerge, 1956 ===
- Epimelissodes duplocinctus (Cockerell, 1905)
