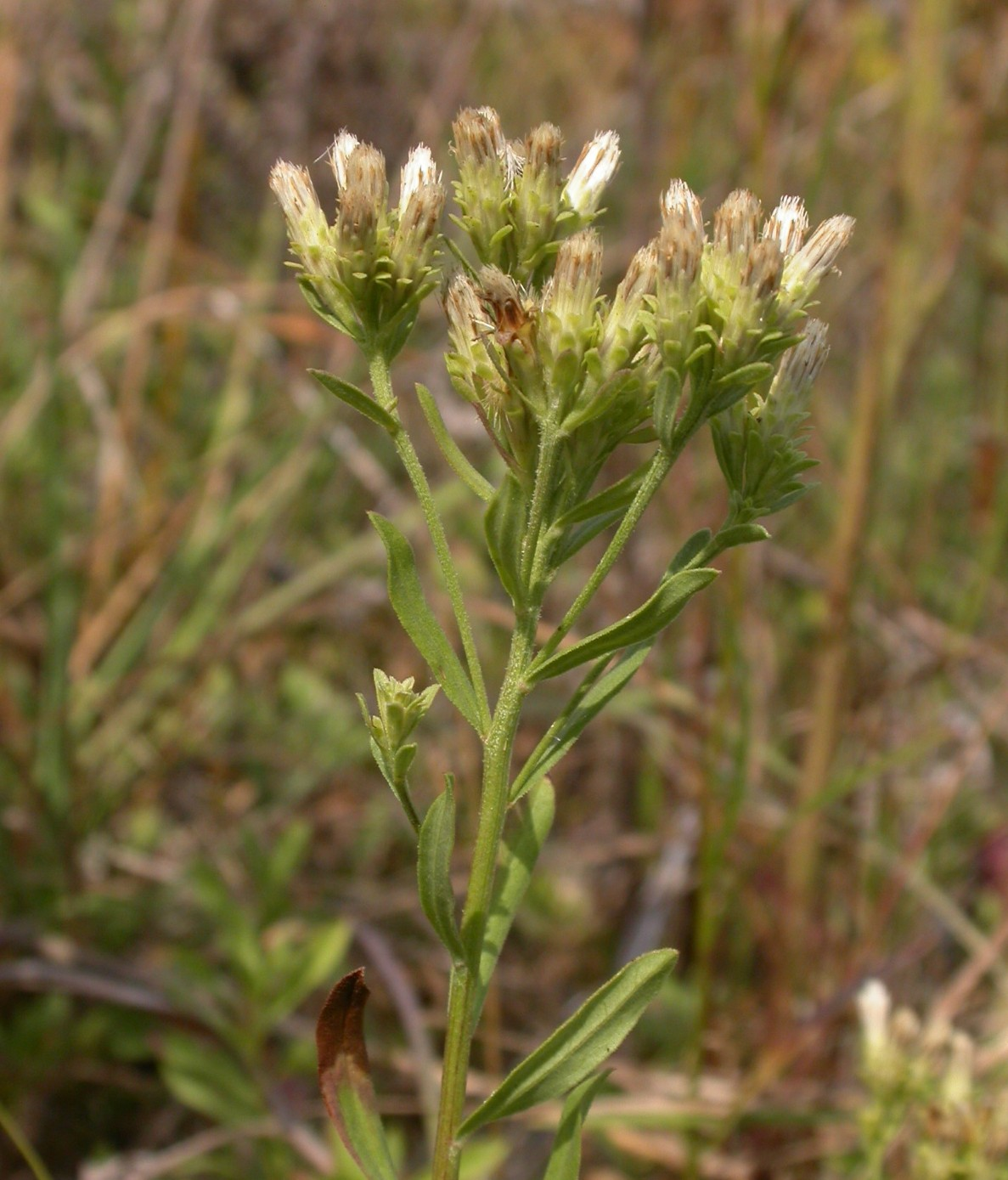
- Sericocarpus rigidus

Scientific classification
- Kingdom: Plantae
- Clade: Embryophytes
- Clade: Tracheophytes
- Clade: Angiosperms
- Clade: Eudicots
- Clade: Asterids
- Order: Asterales
- Family: Asteraceae
- Subfamily: Asteroideae
- Tribe: Astereae
- Subtribe: Solidagininae
- Genus: Sericocarpus; Nees 1832 not Greene

Synonyms
- Aster sect. Sericocarpus (Nees) Semple; Aster subgen. Sericocarpus (Nees) A.G. Jones; Aster sect. Serratifolii Loudon; Oligactis Raf.

= Sericocarpus =

Genus of flowering plants

Sericocarpus is a genus of North American plants in the tribe Astereae within the family Asteraceae. Whitetop aster is a common name for the genus.

Species

- Sericocarpus asteroides – United States (MS AL GA FL SC NC TN KY WV VA MD DE NJ PA OH MI NY CT MA RI VT NH ME)
- Sericocarpus linifolius – United States (LA MS AL GA SC NC TN KY WV VA MD DE NJ PA OH IN MI NY CT MA RI NH)
- Sericocarpus oregonensis United States (CA OR WA)
- Sericocarpus rigidus – Canada (BC), United States (WA OR)
- Sericocarpus tortifolius – United States (LA MS AL GA FL SC NC)

formerly included

see Eucephalus

- Sericocarpus tomentellus – Eucephalus tomentellus
