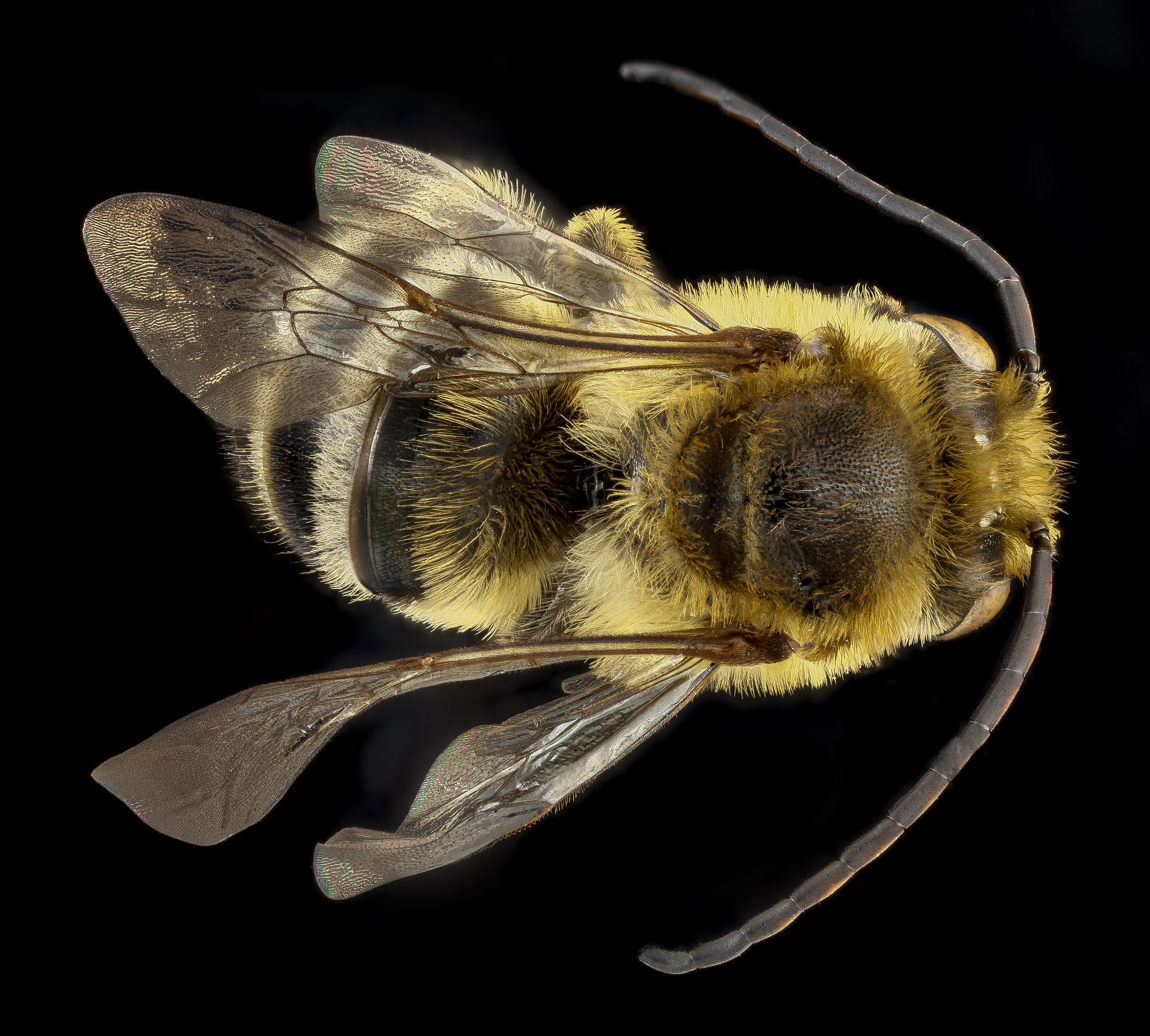
- Florilegus condignus

Scientific classification
- Domain: Eukaryota
- Kingdom: Animalia
- Phylum: Arthropoda
- Class: Insecta
- Order: Hymenoptera
- Family: Apidae
- Subfamily: Apinae
- Tribe: Eucerini
- Genus: Florilegus; Robertson, 1900

= Florilegus =

Genus of bees

Florilegus is a genus of long-horned bees in the family Apidae. There are about 14 described species in Florilegus.

== Species ==
These 14 species belong to the genus Florilegus:

- Florilegus affinis Urban, 1970
- Florilegus barbiellinii
- Florilegus condignus (Cresson, 1878)
- Florilegus festivus (Smith, 1854)
- Florilegus flavohirtus Urban, 1970
- Florilegus fulvipes (Smith, 1854)
- Florilegus isthmicus
- Florilegus lanierii (Guérin-Méneville, 1845)
- Florilegus melectoides (Smith, 1879)
- Florilegus pavoninus Cockerell
- Florilegus purpurascens Cockerell, 1914
- Florilegus riparius Ogloblin, 1955
- Florilegus similis Urban, 1970
- Florilegus tucumanus (Brèthes, 1910)
