= Syntrichalonia =

Scientific classification
- Domain: Eukaryota
- Kingdom: Animalia
- Phylum: Arthropoda
- Class: Insecta
- Order: Hymenoptera
- Family: Apidae
- Subfamily: Apinae
- Tribe: Eucerini
- Genus: Syntrichalonia; LaBerge, 1957

Genus of bees

Syntrichalonia is a genus of exquisite long-horned bees in the family Apidae. There are at least two described species in Syntrichalonia.

== Species ==
These two species belong to the genus Syntrichalonia:

- Syntrichalonia exquisita (Cresson, 1878) (exquisite long-horned bee)
- Syntrichalonia fuliginea LaBerge, 1994
