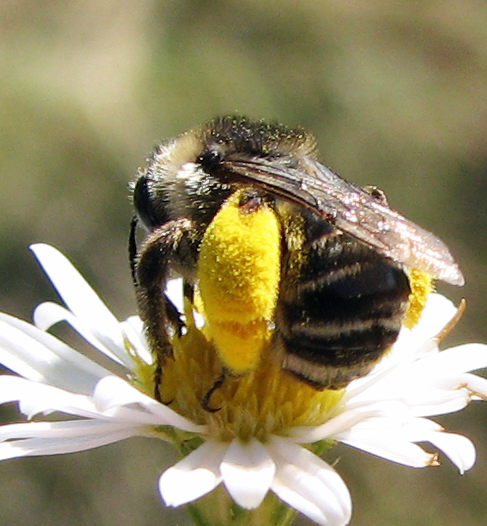

Scientific classification
- Domain: Eukaryota
- Kingdom: Animalia
- Phylum: Arthropoda
- Class: Insecta
- Order: Hymenoptera
- Family: Apidae
- Genus: Melissodes
- Species: M. druriellus

Binomial name
- Melissodes druriellus Kirby, 1802

= Melissodes druriellus =

Species of bee

Melissodes druriellus, the Drury's long-horned bee or rustic longhorn bee, is a species of long-horned bee in the family Apidae. It is found in North America.
