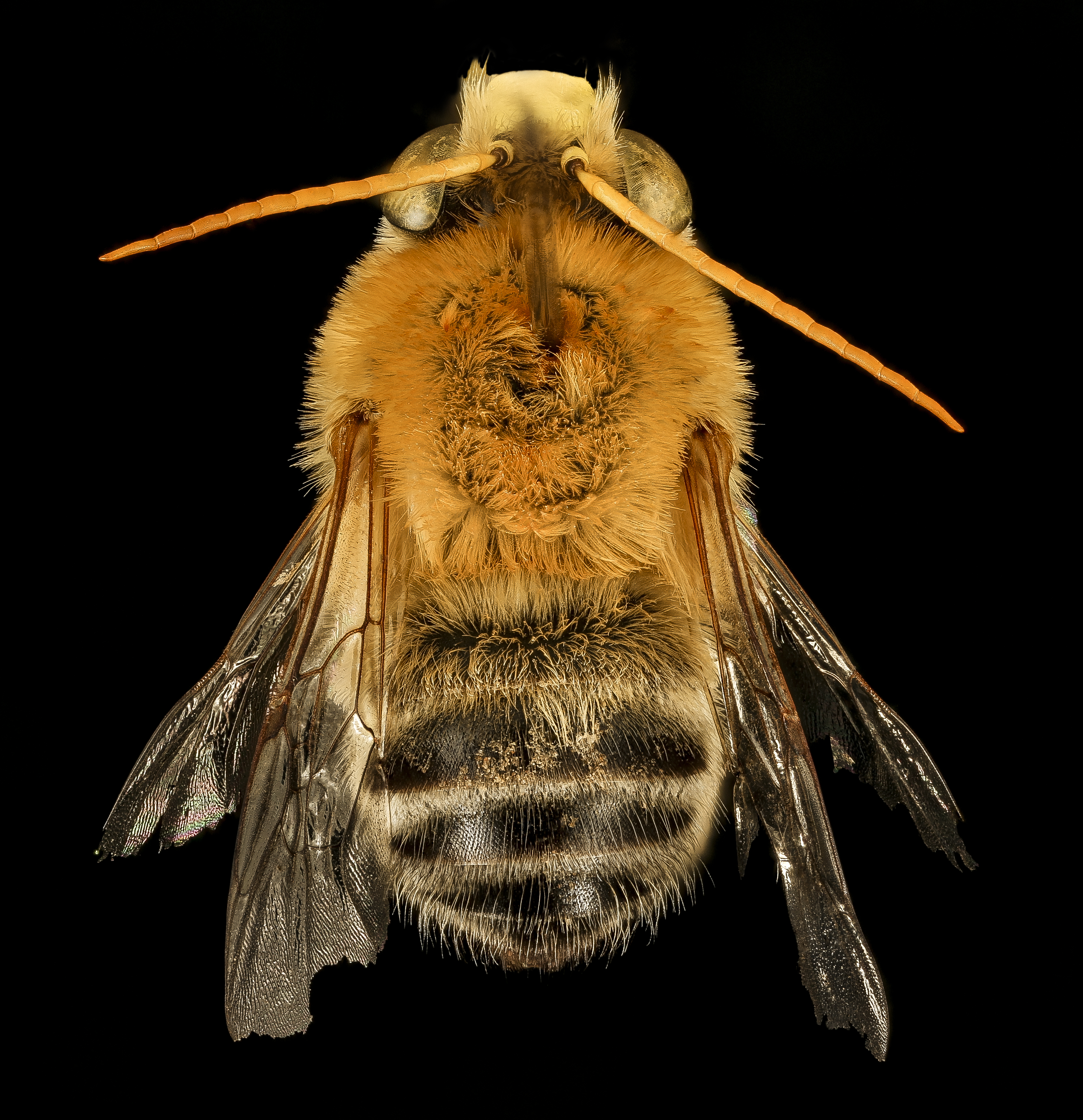
- Martinapis luteicornis

Scientific classification
- Kingdom: Animalia
- Phylum: Arthropoda
- Class: Insecta
- Order: Hymenoptera
- Family: Apidae
- Subfamily: Apinae
- Tribe: Eucerini
- Genus: Martinapis; Cockerell, 1929

= Martinapis =

Genus of bees

Martinapis is a genus of long-horned bees in the family Apidae. There are at least three described species in Martinapis.

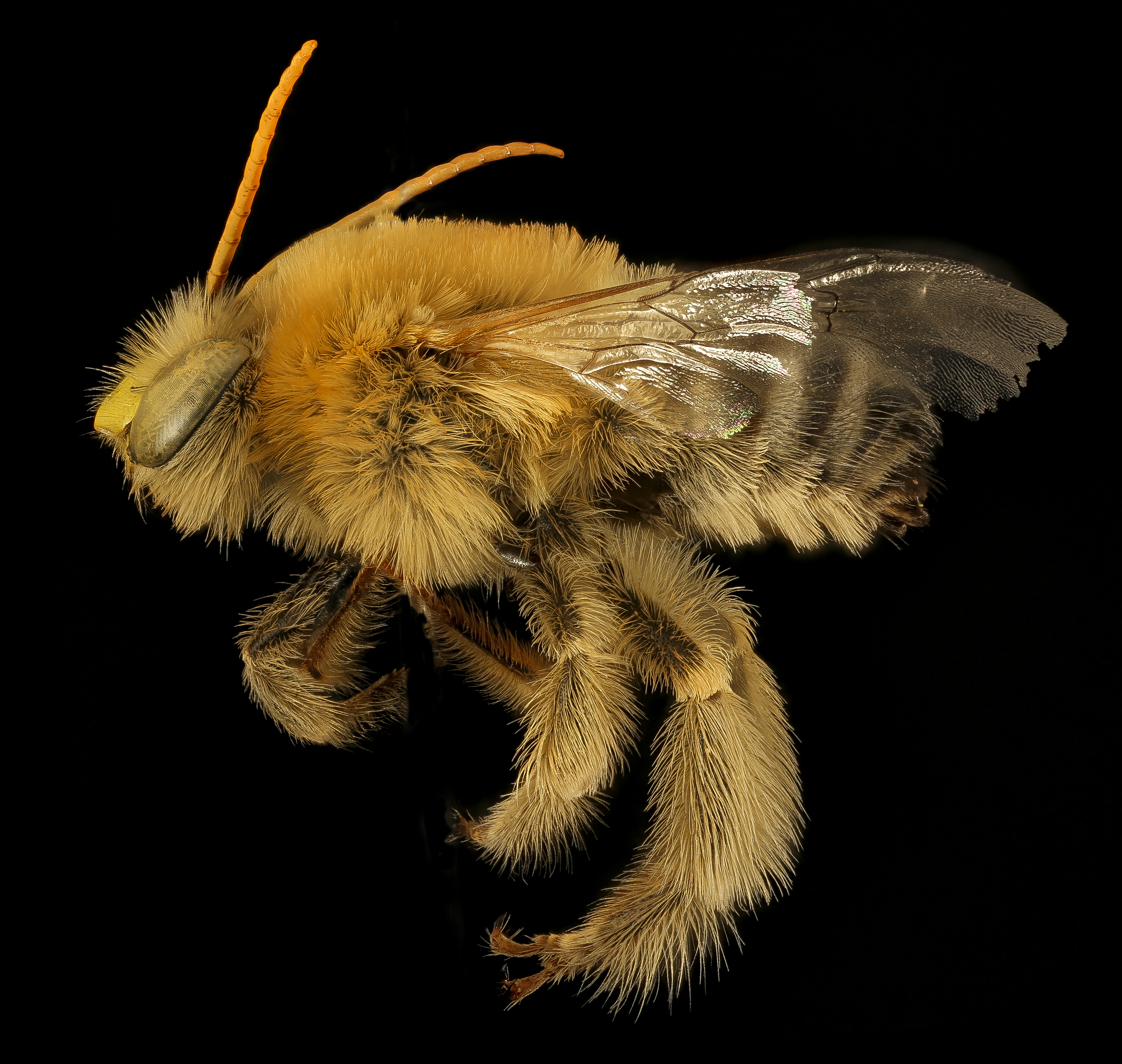
Martinapis luteicornis

== Species ==
These three species belong to the genus Martinapis:

- Martinapis bipunctata (Friese, 1908)
- Martinapis luteicornis (Cockerell, 1896) (yellow-horned morning long-horned bee)
- Martinapis occidentalis Zavortink & LaBerge, 1976 (western morning long-horned bee)
