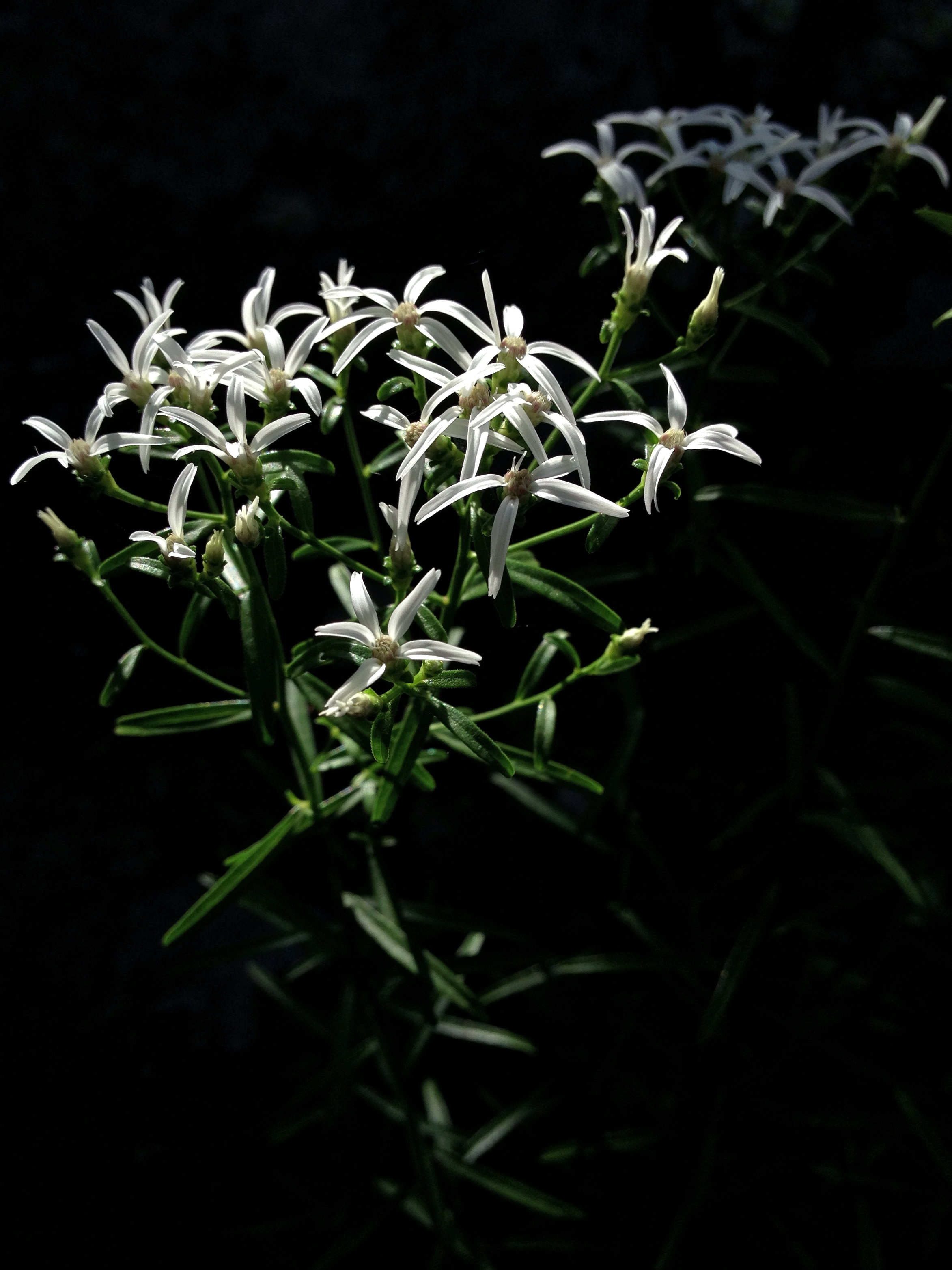

Scientific classification
- Kingdom: Plantae
- Clade: Tracheophytes
- Clade: Angiosperms
- Clade: Eudicots
- Clade: Asterids
- Order: Asterales
- Family: Asteraceae
- Genus: Sericocarpus
- Species: S. linifolius

Binomial name
- Sericocarpus linifolius (L.) Britton, Sterns & Poggenb.

Synonyms
- Aster solidagineus Michx. ex Willd. Aster solidaginoides Pers. Conyza linifolia L. Galatella obtusifolia Lehm. Sericocarpus solidagineus (Michx.) Nees

= Sericocarpus linifolius =

Species of plant

Sericocarpus linifolius, the narrowleaf whitetop aster or flax leaf whitetop, is a perennial forb native to the eastern United States, that produces white composite flowers in summer.

== Description ==
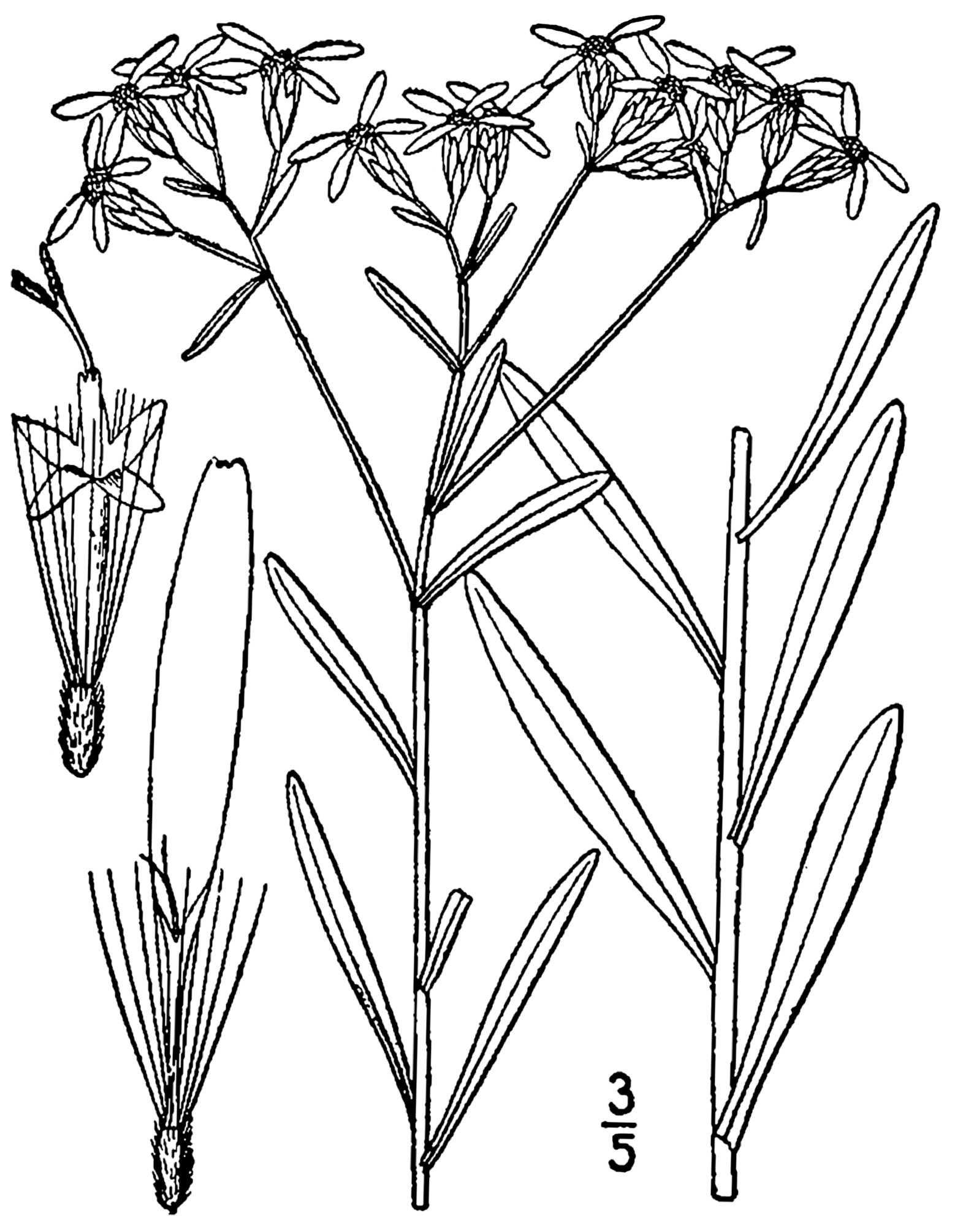
Botanical illustration of Sericocarpus linifolius (1913)

Sericocarpus linifolius has a smooth slender 30 to 75 centimeter tall stem. Its leaves are sessile, they are 2.5 to 5 centimeters long, and only 3 to 6 millimeters wide. They are thick and rough around the edges. The flower heads are borne on branches forming a flat topped cluster. Each flower head consists of 5 to 15 disk flowers and 2 to 6 ray flowers, which are about a centimeter long. The fruit are cypselae with a pappus of white bristles.

== Distribution and habitat ==
Sericocarpus linifolius is widely distributed in the eastern United States, although local distribution may be spotty. It has been recorded in Alabama, Connecticut, Washington, D.C., Delaware, Georgia, Indiana, Kentucky, Louisiana, Massachusetts, Maryland, Mississippi, North Carolina, New Hampshire, New Jersey, New York, Ohio, Pennsylvania, Rhode Island, South Carolina, Tennessee, Virginia, and West Virginia. Sericocarpus linifolius is listed as an endangered species by the state of Pennsylvania, and threatened in Ohio, New Hampshire, and New York. In Virginia it grows in habitats such as dry woodlands, barrens, riverside prairies, clearings, and meadows. The presence of this species is dependent on appropriate habitat, and it may be eliminated from an area by development, changes in land use, or competition with invasive species.
