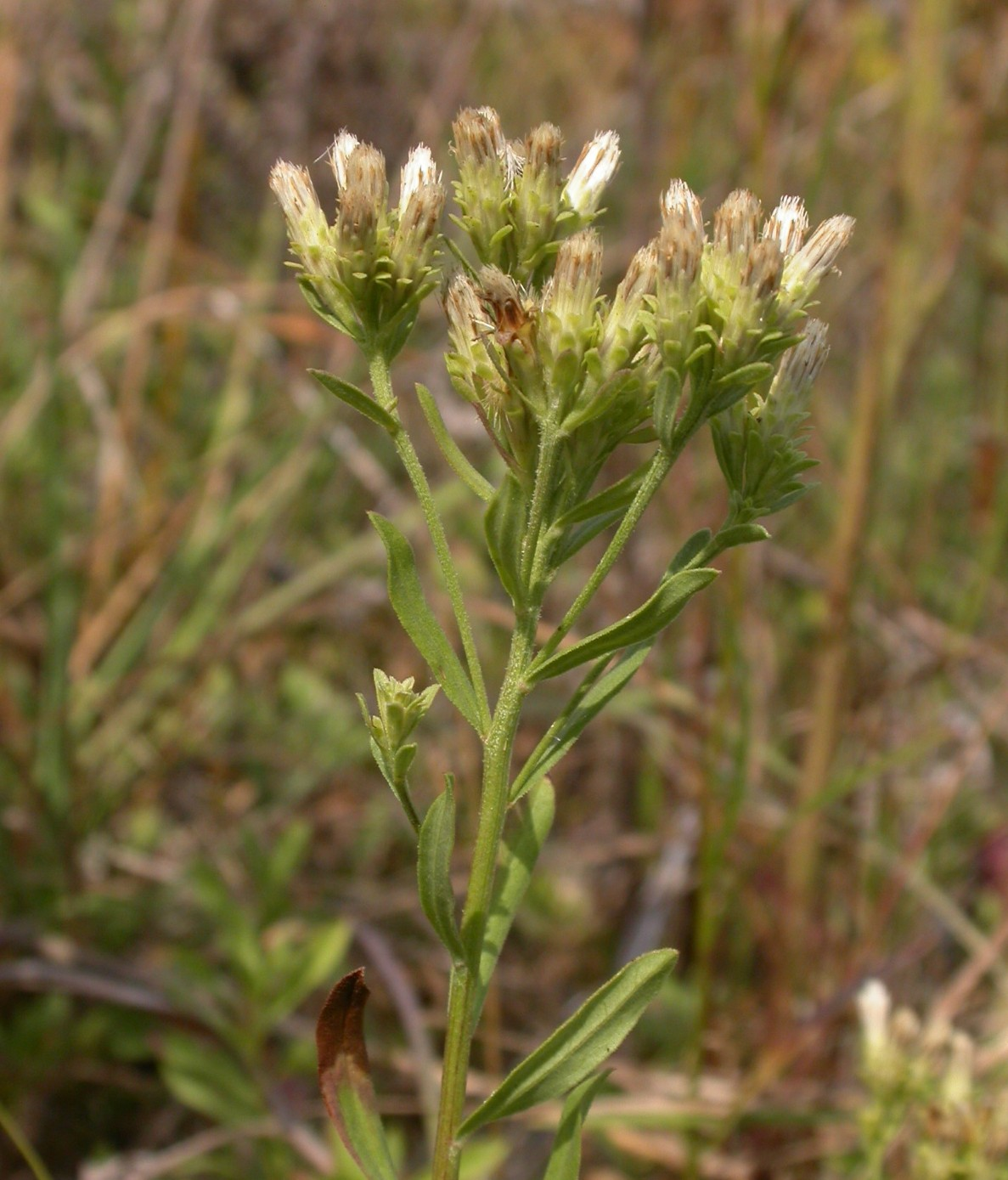

Conservation status
- Vulnerable (NatureServe)

Scientific classification
- Kingdom: Plantae
- Clade: Tracheophytes
- Clade: Angiosperms
- Clade: Eudicots
- Clade: Asterids
- Order: Asterales
- Family: Asteraceae
- Genus: Sericocarpus
- Species: S. rigidus

Binomial name
- Sericocarpus rigidus Lindl.

Synonyms
- Aster curtus

= Sericocarpus rigidus =

Species of plant

Sericocarpus rigidus is a species of flowering plant in the family Asteraceae known by the common name Columbian whitetop aster. It is native to the Pacific Northwest of North America, where it is known from southern Vancouver Island in British Columbia south along the coast to Washington and Oregon.

This rhizomatous perennial herb grows up to about 37 centimeters tall. Leaves along the stem are somewhat oval in shape and up to 6 centimeters long. The inflorescence has clusters of flower heads each up to about a centimeter long. Each contains white or off-white disc florets and usually a few white ray florets.

This species grows in grassland habitat which is generally dominated by Idaho fescue (Festuca idahoensis). It grows in gravelly soils originating from glacier activity in the northern part of its range, and clay soils farther south. The soils are moist most of the year but dry in the summer. Associated species include snowberry (Symphoricarpos albus), serviceberry (Amelanchier alnifolia), Oregon sunshine (Eriophyllum lanatum) and early blue violet (Viola adunca). Much of the habitat is also covered with introduced species such as Scot's broom (Cytisus scoparius) and yellow hairgrass (Aira praecox).

The invasion of the habitat by introduced species is a threat to this plant. Other threats include loss of habitat to development, off-road vehicles, military activity, and fire suppression.
