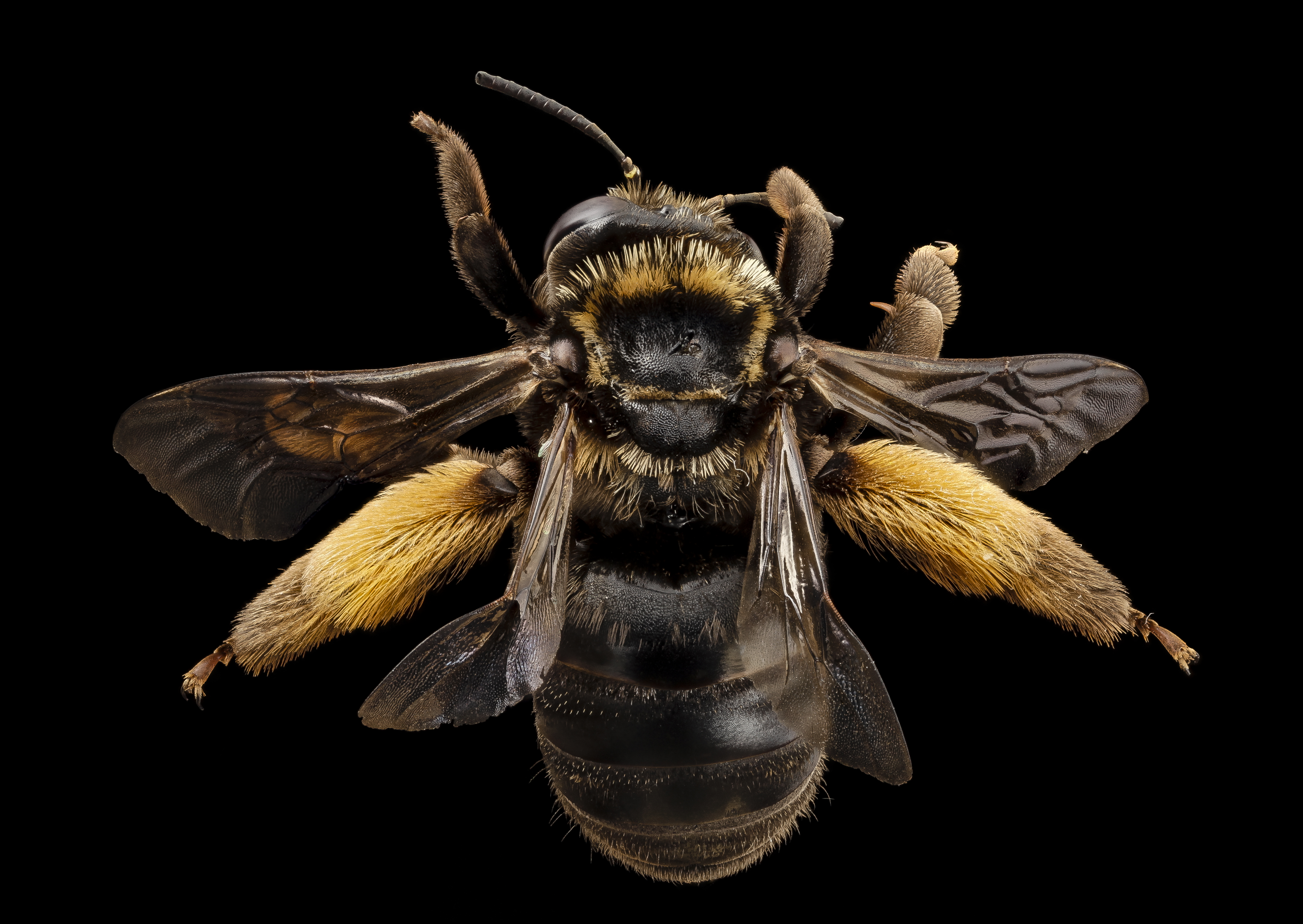

Scientific classification
- Domain: Eukaryota
- Kingdom: Animalia
- Phylum: Arthropoda
- Class: Insecta
- Order: Hymenoptera
- Family: Apidae
- Genus: Svastra
- Species: S. obliqua

Binomial name
- Svastra obliqua (Say, 1837)

= Svastra obliqua =

Species of bee

Svastra obliqua, the sunflower bee, is a species of long-horned bee in the family Apidae. It is found in Central America and North America.

== Subspecies ==
These three subspecies belong to the species Svastra obliqua:

- Svastra obliqua caliginosa (Cresson, 1878)
- Svastra obliqua expurgata (Cockerell, 1925)
- Svastra obliqua obliqua (Say, 1837)
