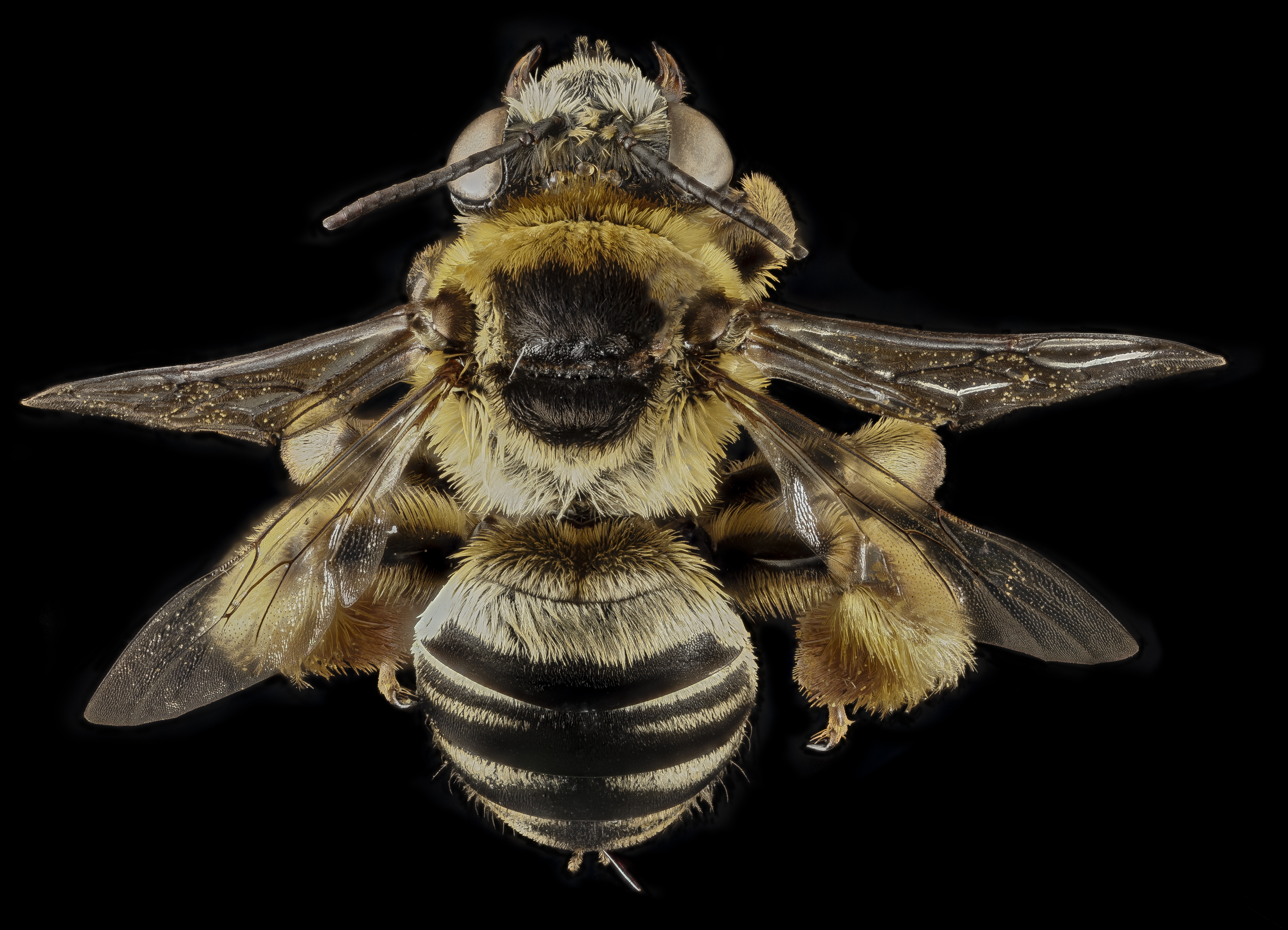

Scientific classification
- Kingdom: Animalia
- Phylum: Arthropoda
- Class: Insecta
- Order: Hymenoptera
- Family: Apidae
- Tribe: Eucerini
- Genus: Svastra
- Species: S. aegis

Binomial name
- Svastra aegis (LaBerge, 1956)

= Svastra aegis =

Species of bee

Svastra aegis is a species of long-horned bee in the family Apidae. It is found in North America.
