= Simanthedon =

Scientific classification
- Domain: Eukaryota
- Kingdom: Animalia
- Phylum: Arthropoda
- Class: Insecta
- Order: Hymenoptera
- Family: Apidae
- Tribe: Eucerini
- Genus: Simanthedon; Zavortink, 1975
- Species: S. linsleyi

Binomial name
- Simanthedon linsleyi Zavortink, 1975

Genus of bees

Simanthedon is a genus of long-horned bees in the family Apidae, containing a single described species, Simanthedon linsleyi.
