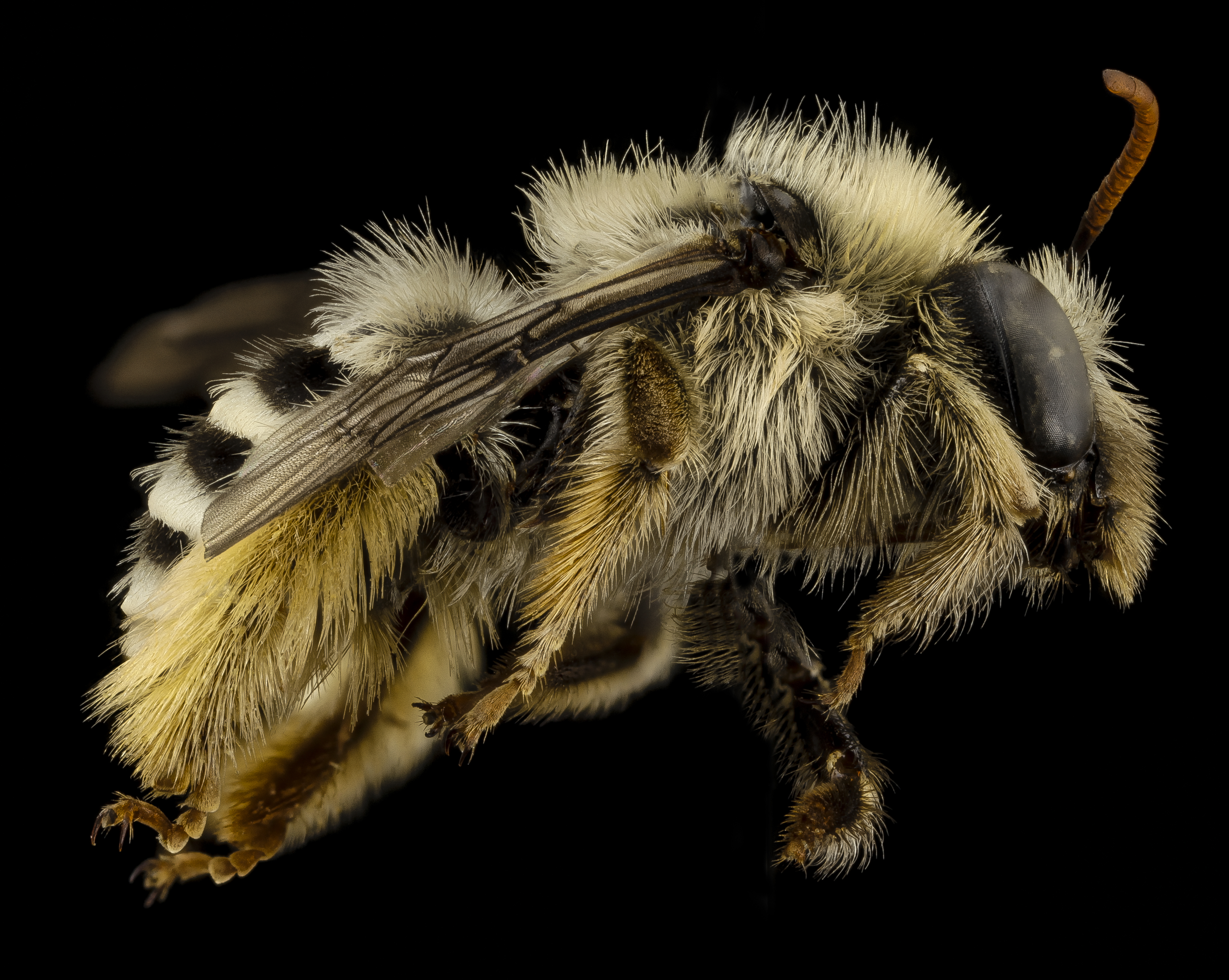
- Eucerinoda gayi, Gay’s eucerine

Scientific classification
- Kingdom: Animalia
- Phylum: Arthropoda
- Class: Insecta
- Order: Hymenoptera
- Family: Apidae
- Genus: Eucerinoda; Michener and Moure 1957
- Species: E. gayi

Binomial name
- Eucerinoda gayi (Spinola, 1851)

= Eucerinoda =

Genus of bees

Eucerinoda is a genus in the bee family Apidae, subfamily Apinae. Only one species is described: Eucerinoda gayi, which is known only from central Chile. Eucerinoda belongs to the long-horned bee tribe Eucerini, but is one of the species in which the males have relatively short antennae. It is the sister taxon to all other species of Eucerini. Eucerinoda seems to restrict its pollen foraging to flowers of the family Asteraceae, although additional sources may be used for nectar.
