= Thygater =

Scientific classification
- Domain: Eukaryota
- Kingdom: Animalia
- Phylum: Arthropoda
- Class: Insecta
- Order: Hymenoptera
- Family: Apidae
- Tribe: Eucerini
- Genus: Thygater; Holmberg, 1884

Genus of bees

Thygater is a genus of bees belonging to the family Apidae.

The species of this genus are found in Central and South America.

Species:

- Thygater aethiops (Smith, 1854)
- Thygater anae Urban, 1999
- Thygater analis (Lepeletier, 1841)
- Thygater carijo Freitas & Silveira, 2018
- Thygater chaetaspis Moure, 1941
- Thygater cockerelli (Crawford, 1906)
- Thygater colombiana Urban, 1967
- Thygater crawfordi Urban, 1967
- Thygater danunciae Freitas & Silveira, 2017
- Thygater dispar (Smith, 1854)
- Thygater hirtiventris Urban, 1967
- Thygater laevis Urban, 1999
- Thygater latitarsis Urban, 1967
- Thygater luederwaldti (Schrottky, 1910)
- Thygater melanotricha Urban, 1967
- Thygater mexicana Urban, 1967
- Thygater micheneri Urban, 1967
- Thygater minarum Urban, 1999
- Thygater montezuma (Cresson, 1879)
- Thygater mourei Urban, 1961
- Thygater nigropilosa Urban, 1967
- Thygater oliveirae (Holmberg, 1903)
- Thygater palliventris (Friese, 1908)
- Thygater paranaensis Urban, 1967
- Thygater rubricata (Smith, 1879)
- Thygater seabrai Urban, 1967
- Thygater sordidipennis Moure, 1941
- Thygater tuberculata Urban, 1967
- Thygater ubirajarai Urban, 1999
- Thygater xanthopyga Urban, 1967
