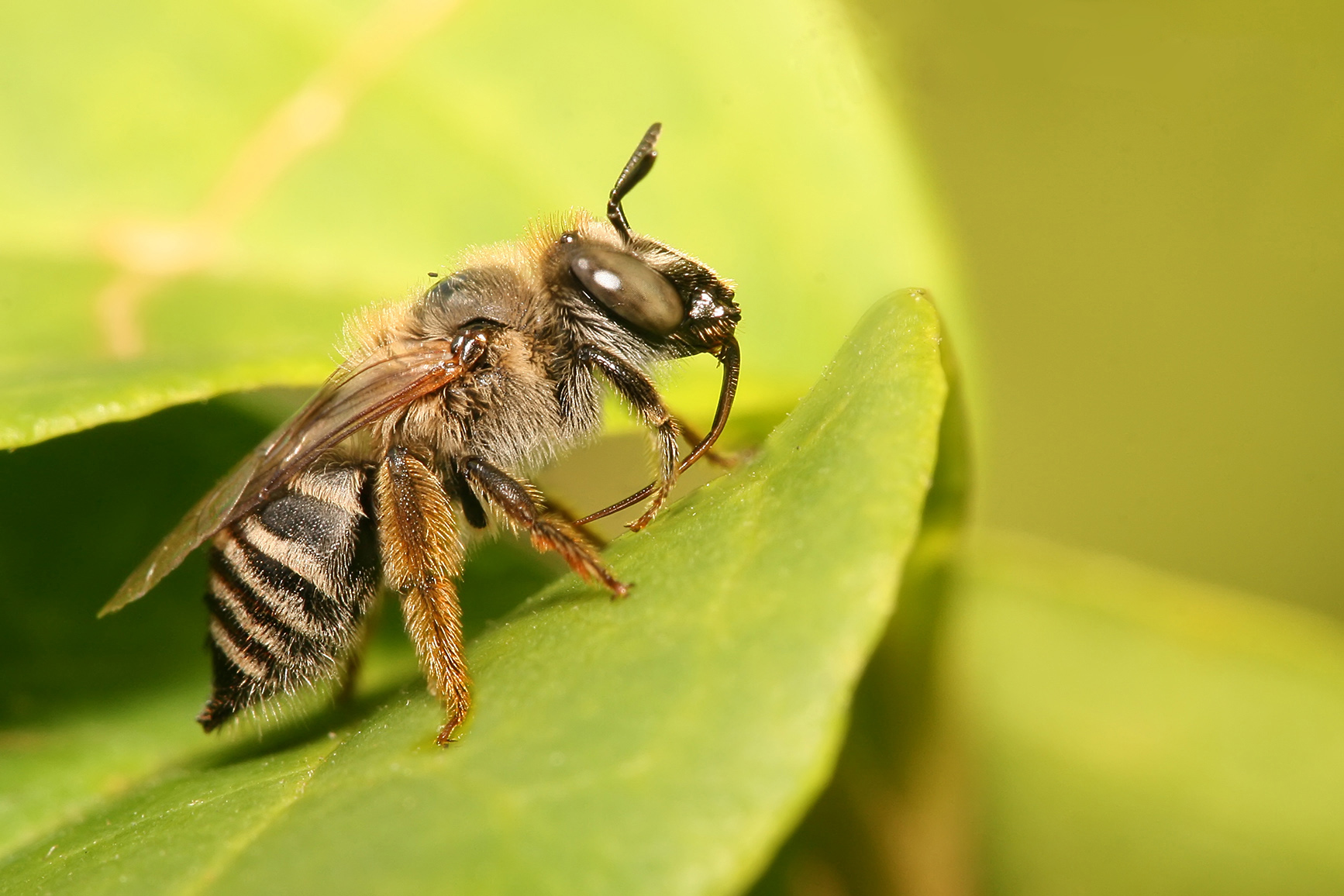
- Tetraloniella sp.

Scientific classification
- Domain: Eukaryota
- Kingdom: Animalia
- Phylum: Arthropoda
- Class: Insecta
- Order: Hymenoptera
- Family: Apidae
- Subfamily: Apinae
- Tribe: Eucerini
- Genus: Tetraloniella; Ashmead, 1899

Diversity
- at least 100 species

= Tetraloniella =

Genus of bees

Tetraloniella is a genus of long-horned bees in the family Apidae. There are more than 100 described species in Tetraloniella with most being from North America

Tetraloniella species are solitary and nest in the ground. There have been records of some species that nest in aggregate, with some nests being used over several generations

The dietary preferences of most Tetraloniella species are not known, however there are generalist and specialist species. The specialist species have been noted to be specialists of Asteraceae

== See also ==
- List of Tetraloniella species
