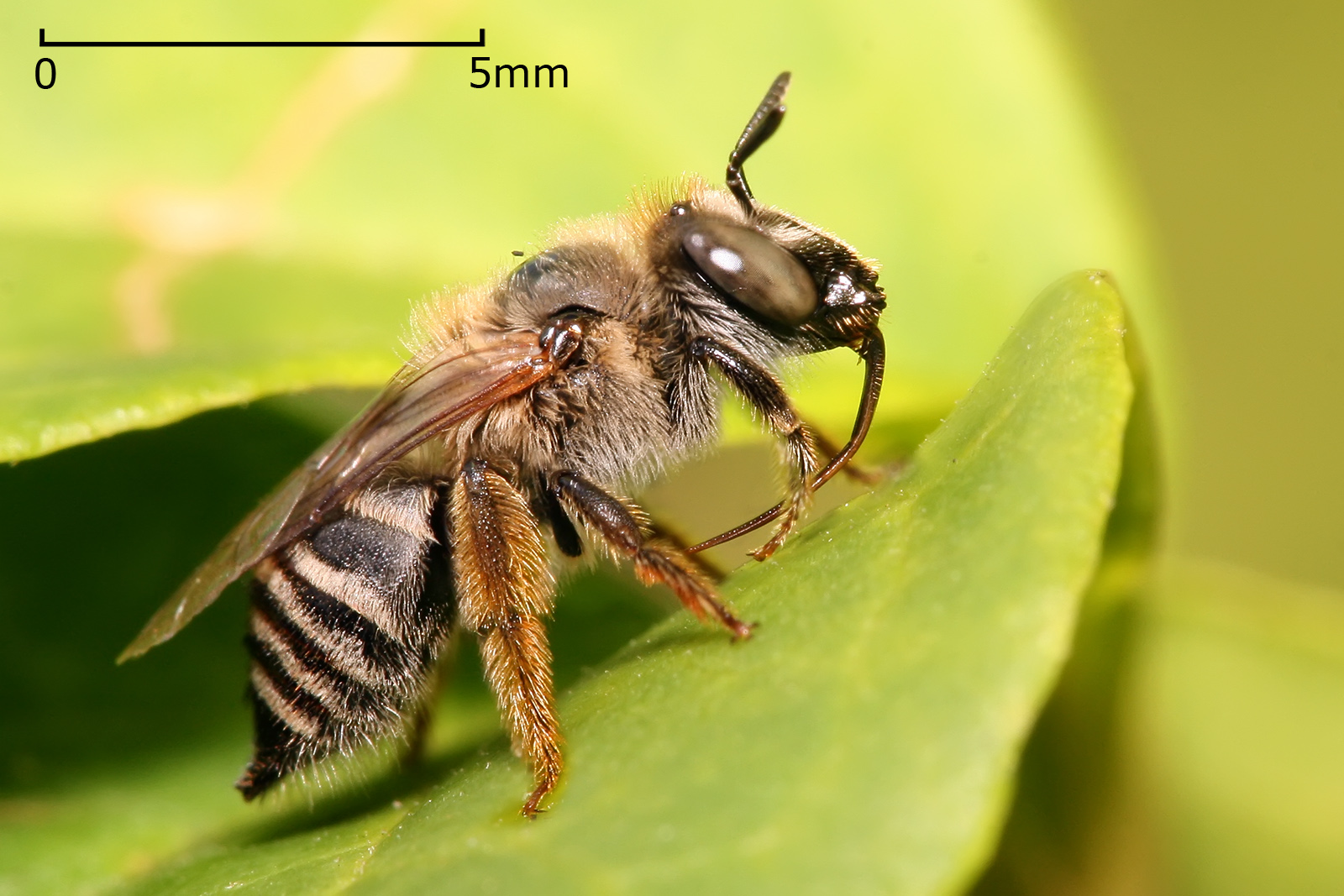
- Female Tetraloniella sp.

Scientific classification
- Kingdom: Animalia
- Phylum: Arthropoda
- Clade: Pancrustacea
- Class: Insecta
- Order: Hymenoptera
- Family: Apidae
- Subfamily: Apinae
- Tribe: Eucerini; Latreille, 1802

Genera
- Over 30, see text

= Eucerini =

Tribe of bees

The Eucerini (often called longhorn bees or long-horned bees) are the most diverse tribe in the family Apidae, with over 32 genera worldwide that were previously classified as members of the family Anthophoridae. All species are solitary, though many nest in large aggregations, and large "sleeping" aggregations of males are found occasionally. Most genera are distinctive in the unusually long male antennae from which the tribe derives its name (eucer- means true horned). They are most diverse in the Western Hemisphere.

== Classification ==
The classification within the tribe is rather chaotic, as many of the genera are small and poorly characterized, with the bulk of species (about 500) in only five genera. This is a group in serious need of a thorough taxonomic overhaul, and the fusion of many genera would likely result (a revision in 2000 eliminated seven genera and another in 2018 eliminated six more).

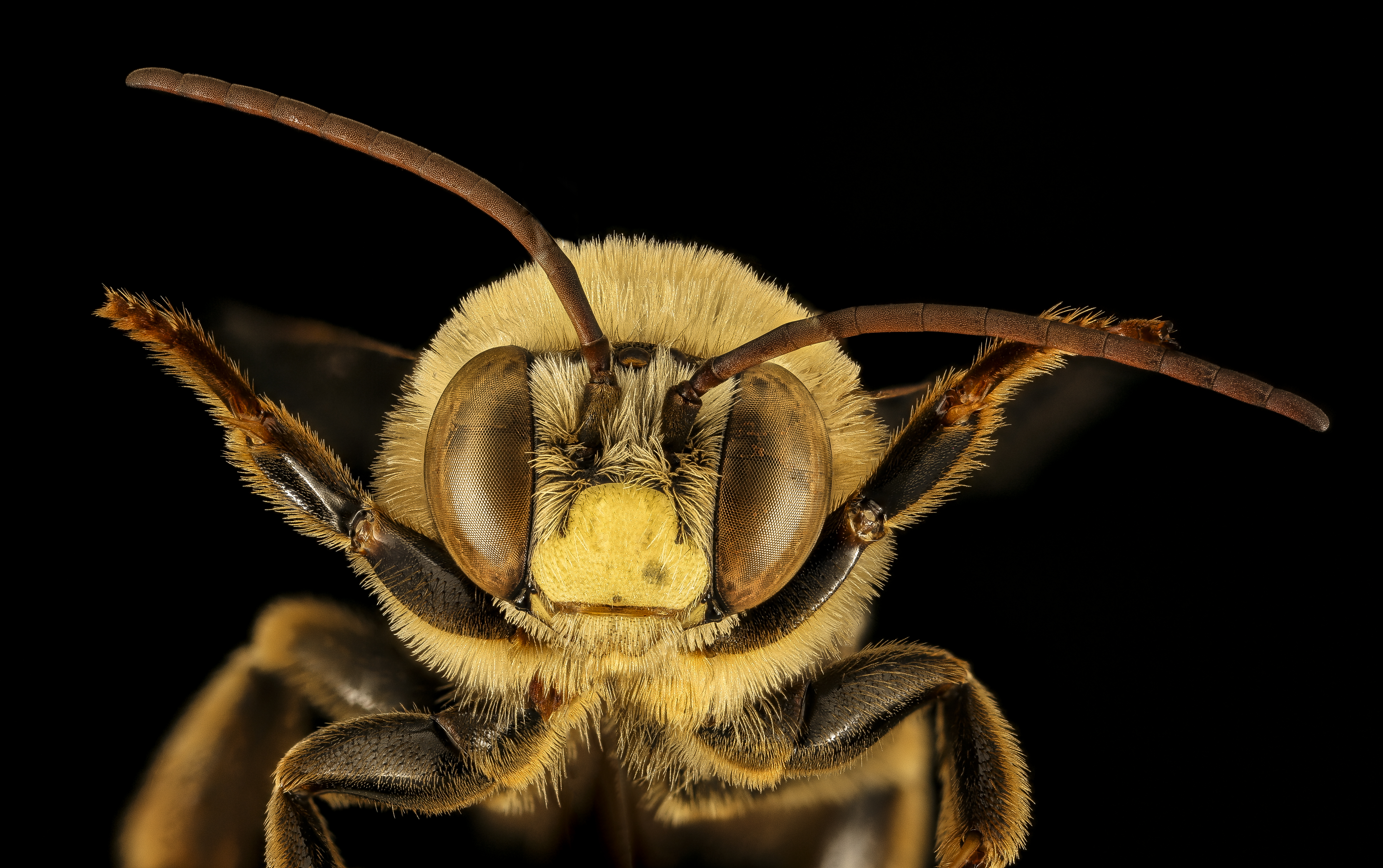
Svastra obliqua

== Genera ==
- Agapanthinus LaBerge, 1957
- Alloscirtetica Holmberg, 1909
- Canephorula Jörgensen, 1909
- Cemolobus Robertson, 1902 (recently moved into Eucera)
- Cubitalia Friese, 1911
- Epimelissodes Ashmead, 1899
- Eucera Scopoli, 1770
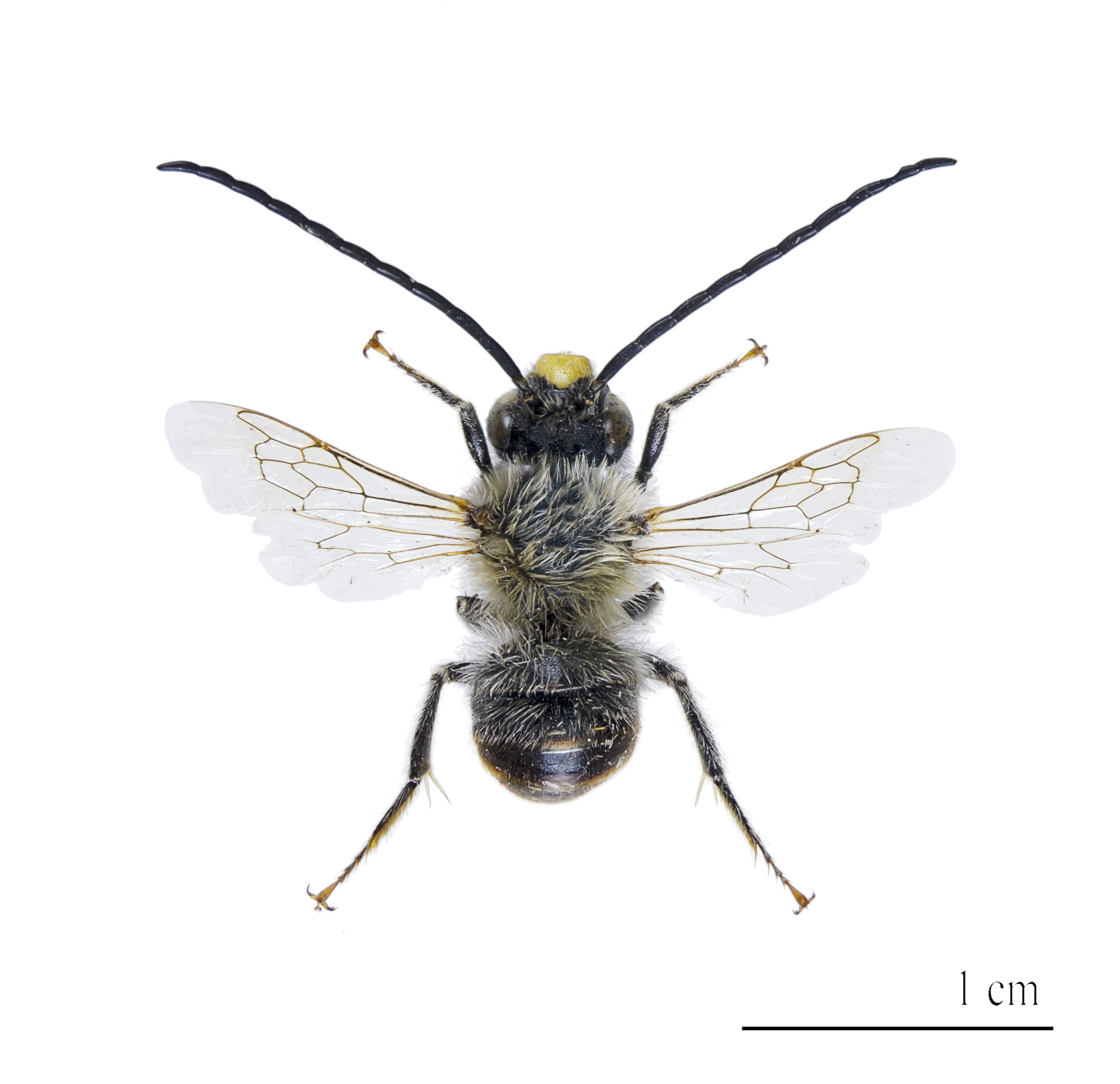
  Eucera nigrescens
- Eucerinoda Michener & Moure, 1957
- Florilegus Robertson, 1900
- Gaesischia Michener, LaBerge & Moure, 1955
- Gaesochira Moure & Michener, 1955
- Hamatothrix Urban, 1989
- Lophothygater Moure & Michener, 1955
- Martinapis Cockerell, 1929
- Melissodes Latreille, 1829
- Melissoptila Holmberg, 1884
- Micronychapis Moure & Michener, 1955
- Mirnapis Urban, 1998
- Notolonia Popov, 1962
- Pachysvastra Moure & Michener, 1955
- Peponapis Robertson, 1902 (recently moved into Eucera)
- Platysvastra Moure, 1967
- Santiago Urban, 1989
- Simanthedon Zavortink, 1975
- Svastra Holmberg, 1884
- Svastrides Michener, LaBerge & Moure, 1955
- Svastrina Moure & Michener, 1955
- Syntrichalonia LaBerge, 1957 (recently moved into Eucera)
- Tetralonia Spinola, 1839 (recently moved into Eucera)
- Tetraloniella Ashmead, 1899
- Thygater Holmberg, 1884
- Trichocerapis Cockerell, 1904
- Ulugombakia Baker, 2003
- Xenoglossa Smith, 1854 (see also Eucera)
