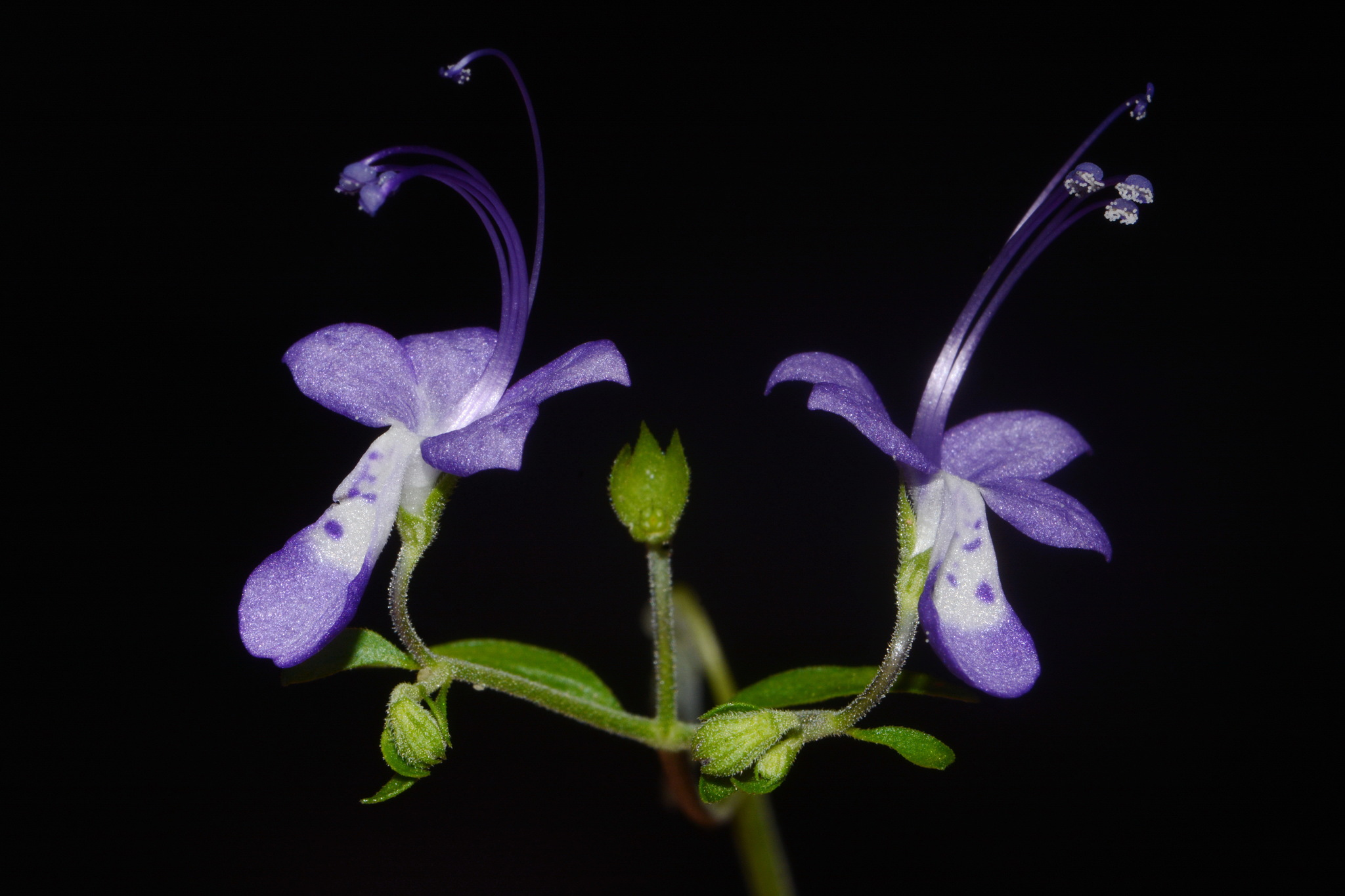

Conservation status
- Unranked (NatureServe)

Scientific classification
- Kingdom: Plantae
- Clade: Tracheophytes
- Clade: Angiosperms
- Clade: Eudicots
- Clade: Asterids
- Order: Lamiales
- Family: Lamiaceae
- Genus: Trichostema
- Species: T. fruticosum

Binomial name
- Trichostema fruticosum K.S.McClelland

= Trichostema fruticosum =

Species of plant

Trichostema fruticosum, commonly known as Bushy Bluecurls, is a species of flowering plant native to the Southeastern United States. This species is relatively recently described, being split out from Trichostema dichotomum in 2023.

== Description ==
Short lived perennial with a bushy to diffuse form reaching about 1.25 m (4 ft) in height. Young stems square, becoming cylindrical with age, and pubescent. Leaves ovate, entire, with obtuse to rarely rounded apex, and cuneate to attenuate base. This species typically flowers and fruits from April to December.

== Range and habitat ==
This species is found in the lower/southern coastal plain of Georgia, coastal plain of Florida, coastal Mississippi, and coastal Alabama. This species is often found in openings of mesic to semi-dry habitats, most commonly near the shore.

== Gallery ==
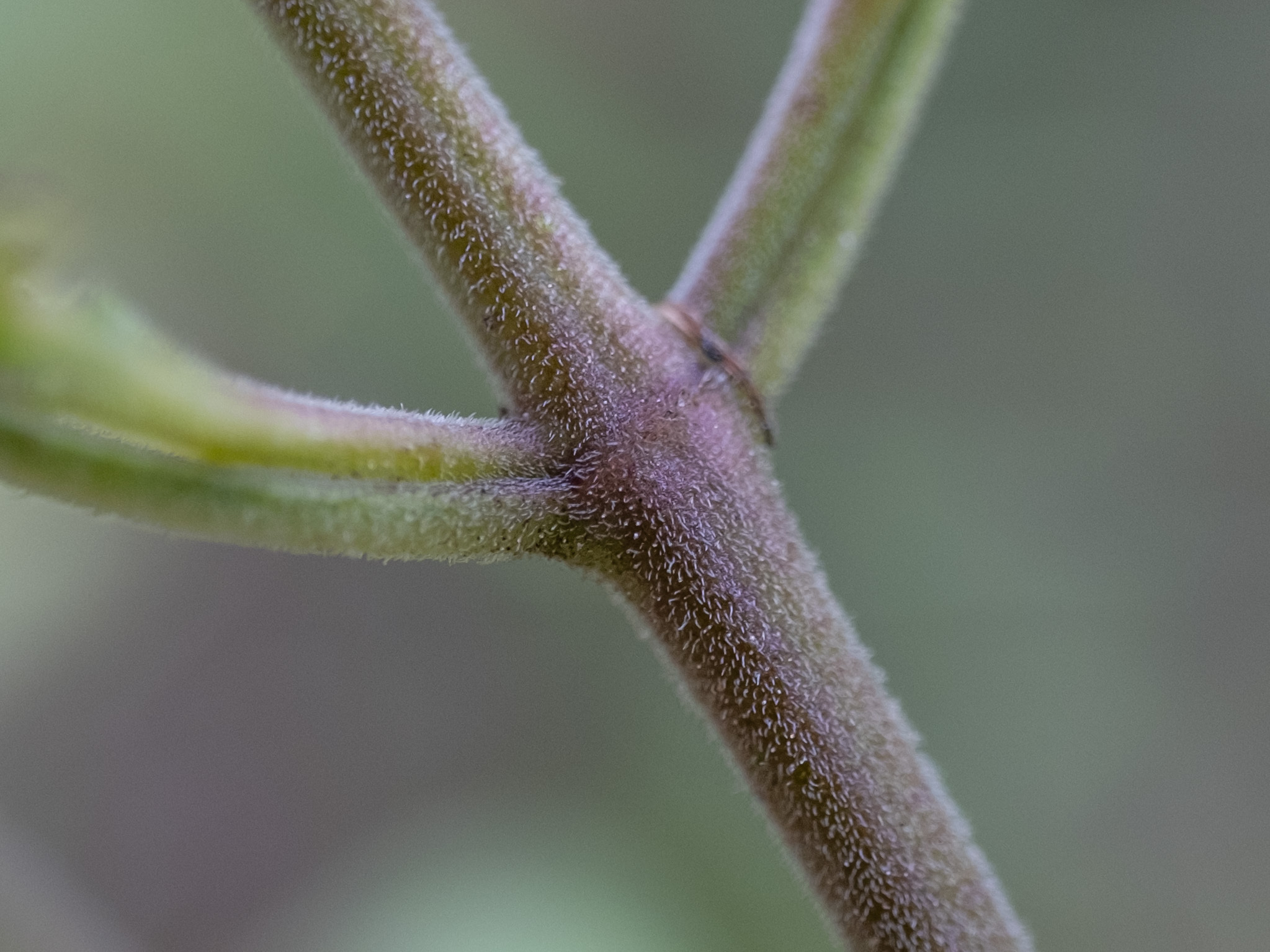
Stem pubescence

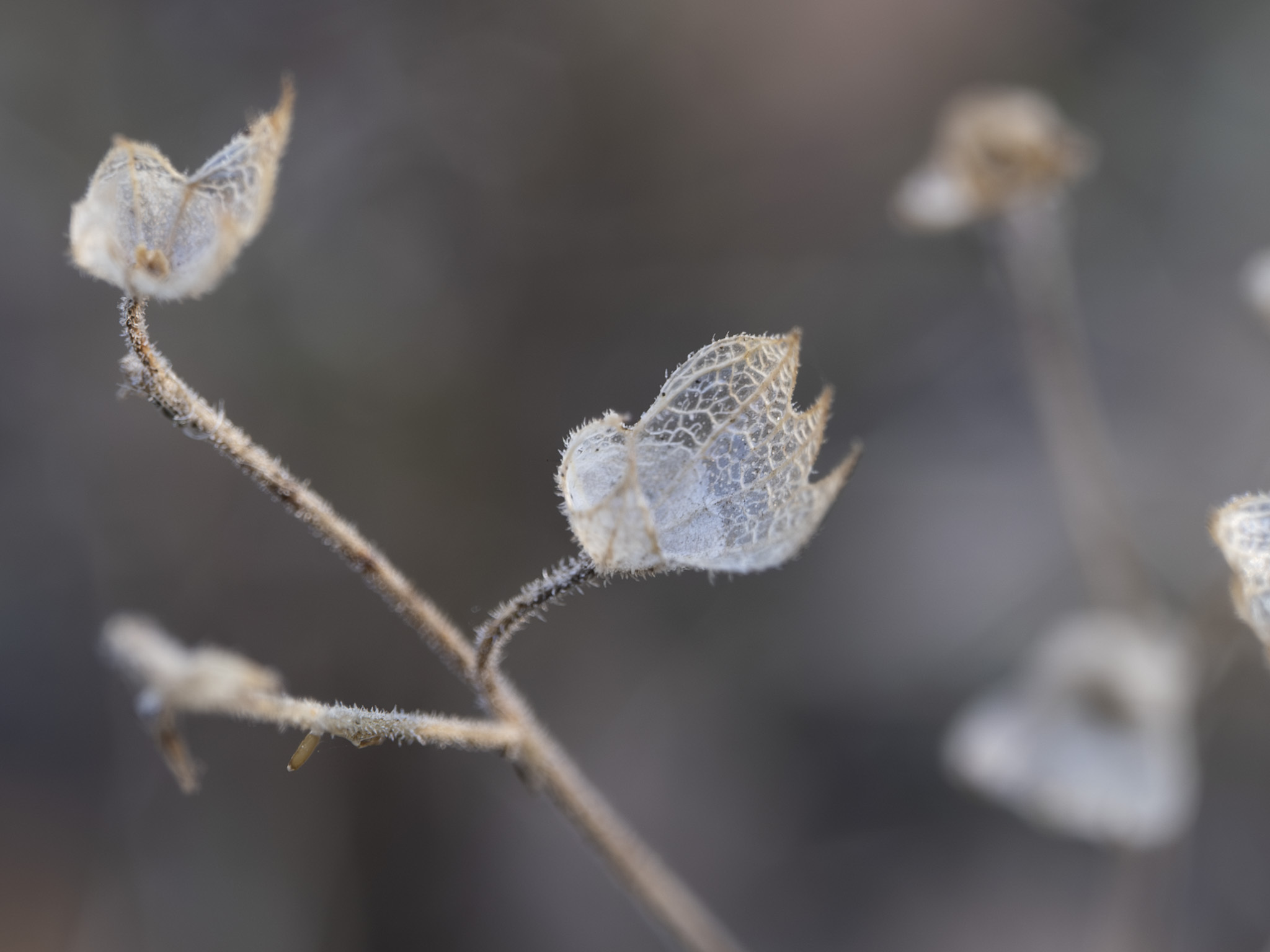
Dried calyx

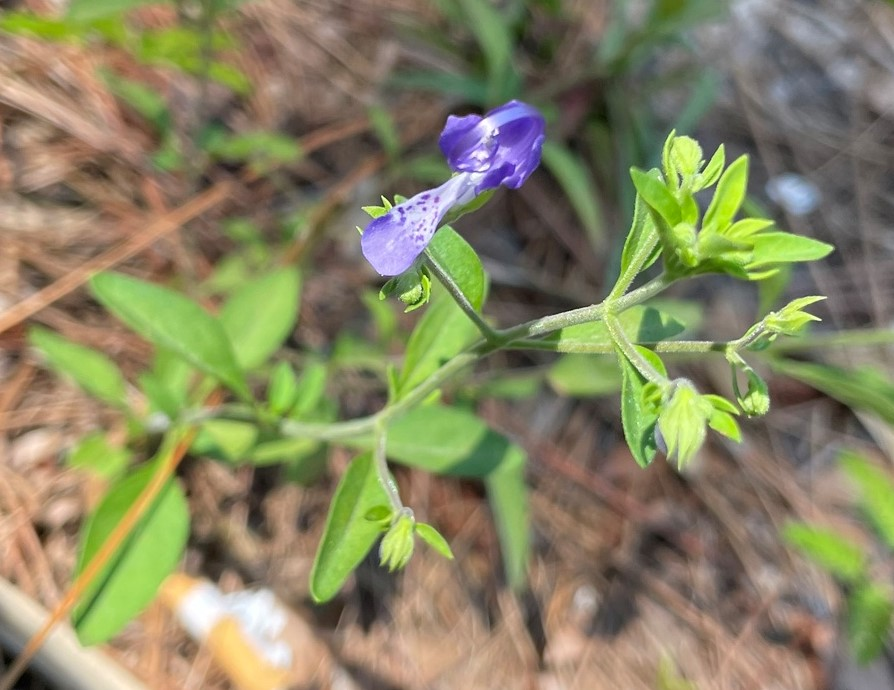
Flower and leaves

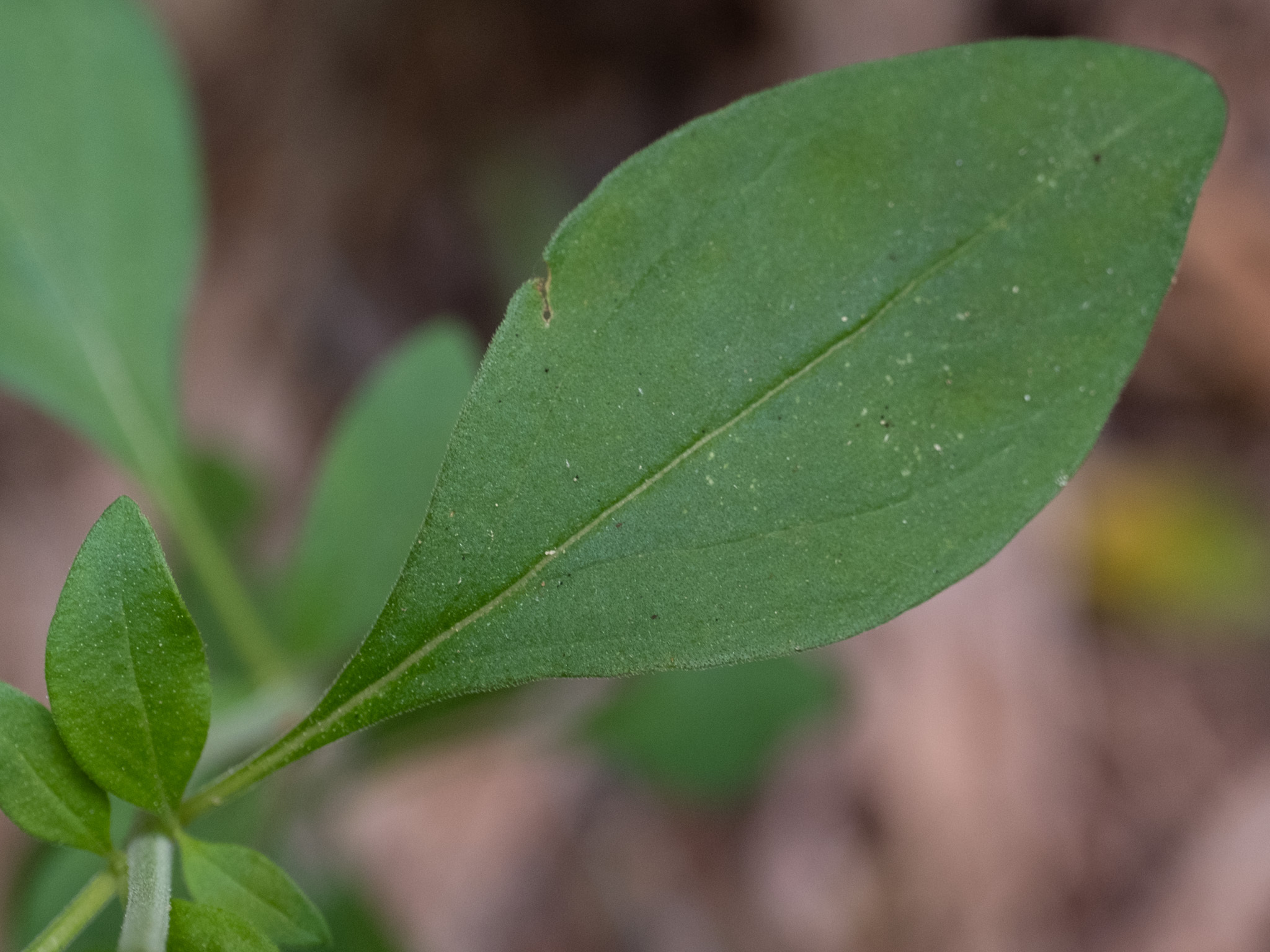
Adaxial leaf surface

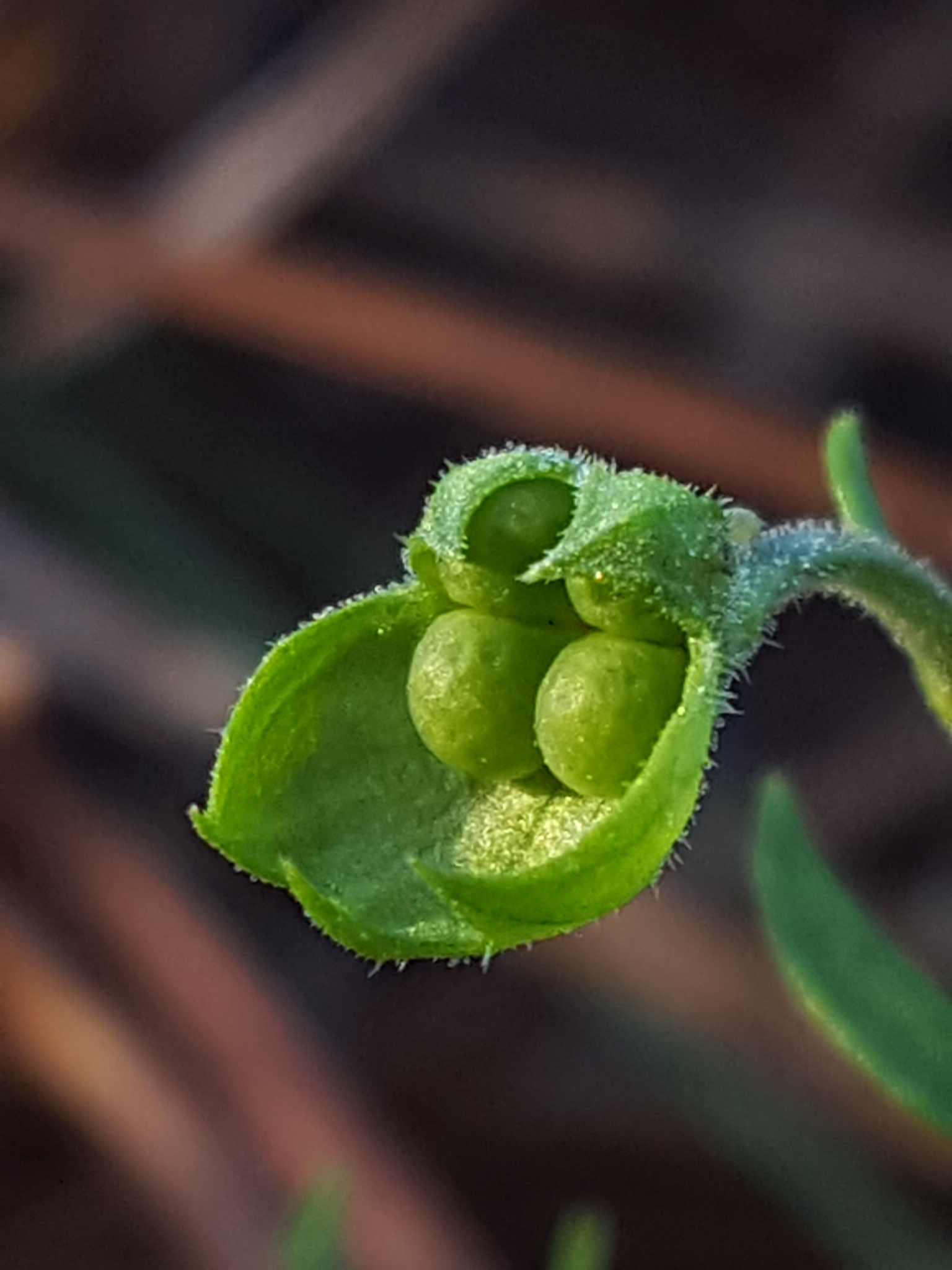
Immature nutlets

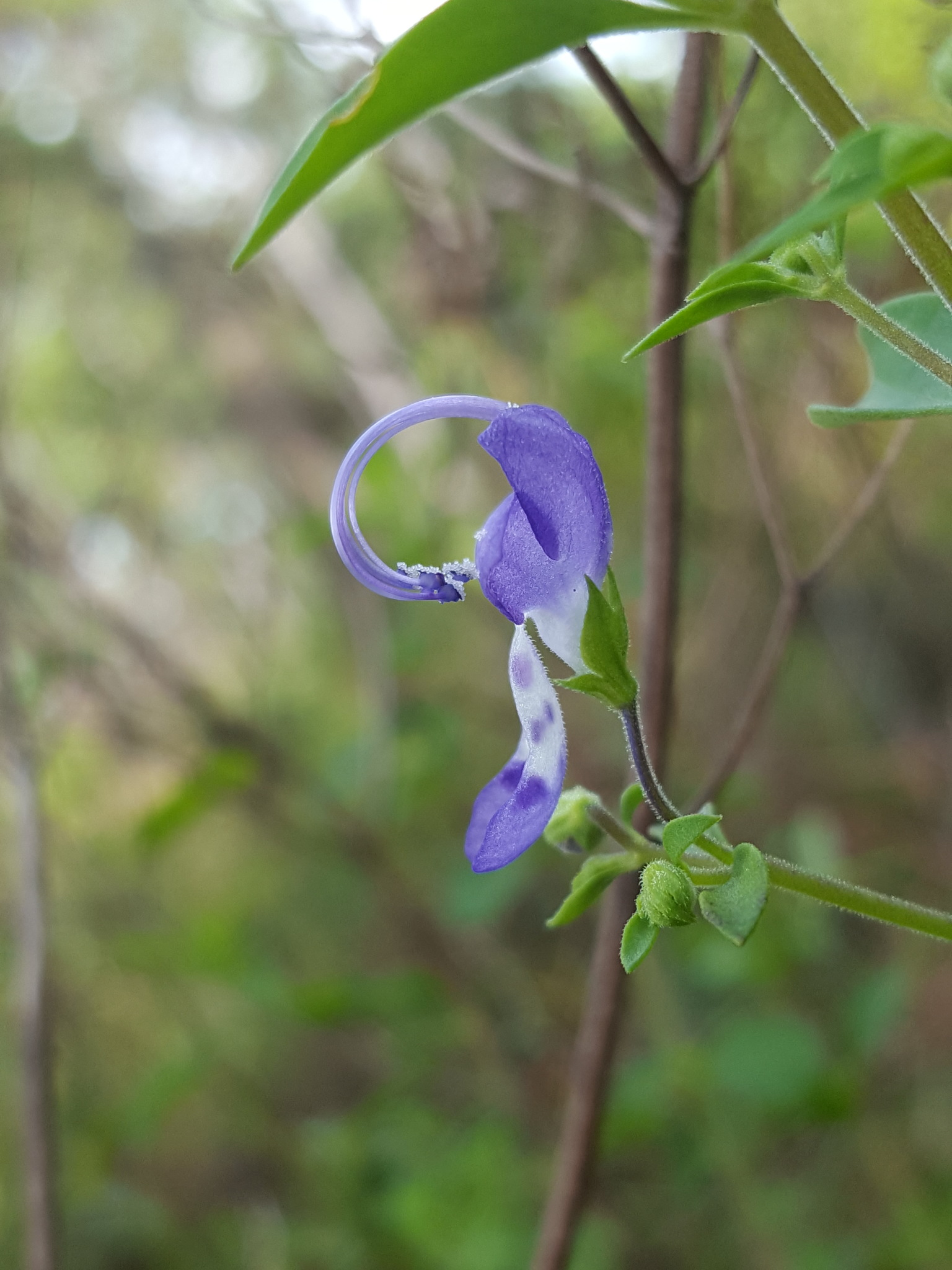
Flower, side profile
