= C. sulcata =

C. sulcata may refer to:

- Coelolepis sulcata, a prehistoric jawless fish species from the Silurian
- Commelina sulcata, a synonym for Commelina erecta, the white mouth dayflower or slender dayflower, a perennial herb native throughout the Americas, Africa and western Asia

== See also ==
- Sulcata
