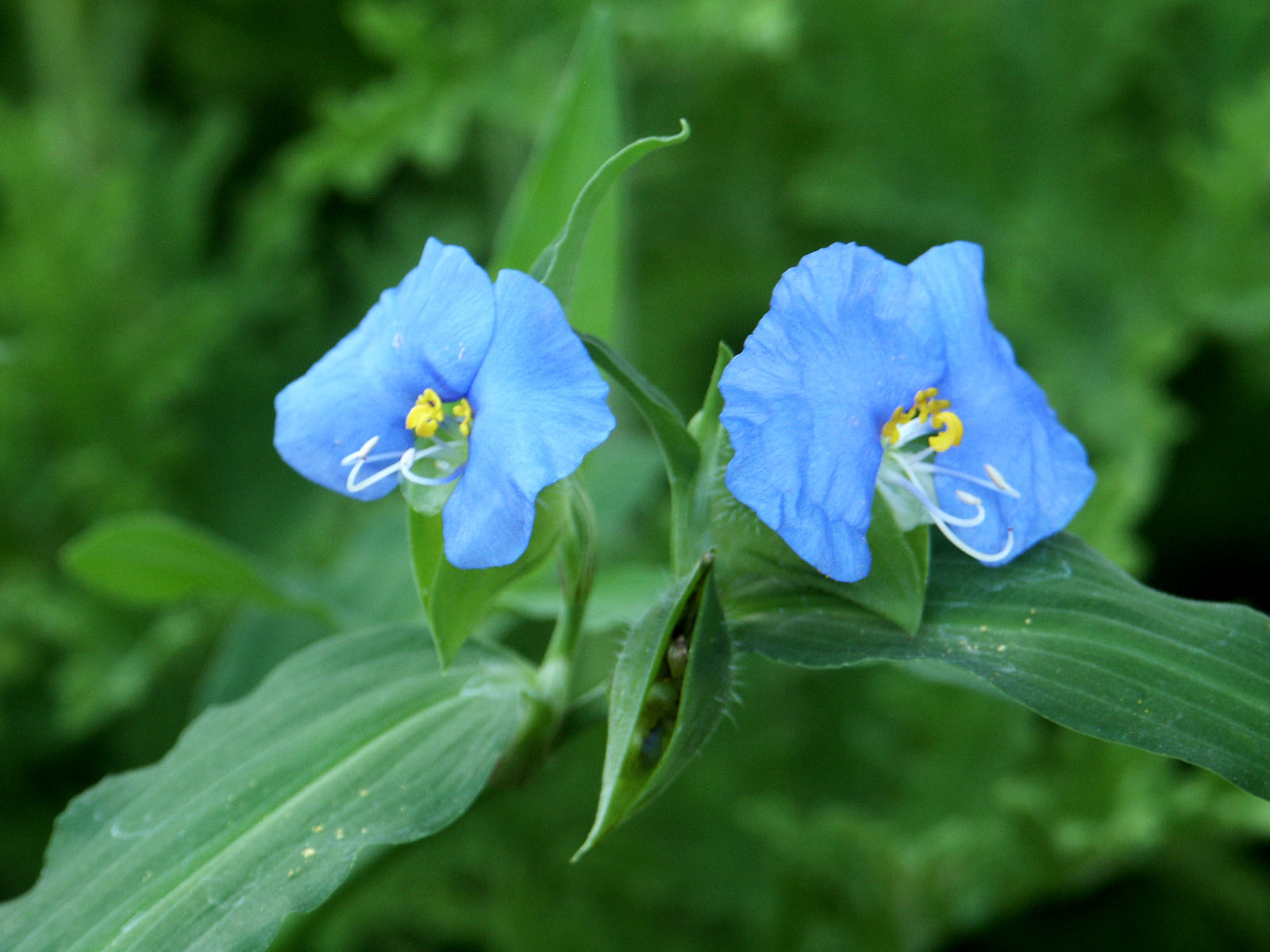
- Commelina erecta in an Israeli garden

Conservation status
- Secure (NatureServe)

Scientific classification
- Kingdom: Plantae
- Clade: Embryophytes
- Clade: Tracheophytes
- Clade: Spermatophytes
- Clade: Angiosperms
- Clade: Monocots
- Clade: Commelinids
- Order: Commelinales
- Family: Commelinaceae
- Genus: Commelina
- Species: C. erecta

Binomial name
- Commelina erecta L., Sp. Pl. 1: 41. 1753.

Synonyms
- Commelina elegans Kunth; Commelina pohliana Seub.; Commelina sulcata Willd.; Commelina virginica auct. non L.; Commelina virginica L. var. australis C.B.Clarke

= Commelina erecta =

Species of flowering plant

Commelina erecta, commonly known as white mouth dayflower, slender dayflower, or widow's tears. C. erecta is a blue flower often recognized by its two large blue petals and smaller white petal. It is a perennial herb common across the world and native throughout the Americas, Africa and western Asia.

== Description ==
=== Flowers ===
C. erecta is a perennial flower recognized by its two large blue petals and smaller third petal. Due to its three petal arrangement it is botanically recognized as a monocot. The two larger blue petals are located at the top of the plant with the third white petal in between and below them. The full flower is three-quarters to one and a quarter inches across. Each flower only lasts for a Day earning it the nickname the Dayflower. However, the buds on the plant may bloom 3–4 days apart increasing the individual's time in blossom.

Between the petals are the staminoide, central stamen, lateral stamen, and style. Commelina e. exhibits enantiostyly meaning the flowers have two morphs that are mirror images of each other where the style points either left or right. However enantiostyly makes up only two of the three polymorphs of this flower. The third polymorph is a male flower that completely lacks the style.

=== Leaves ===
The leaves are lance-linear (long and thin) with a pointed apex and round base. The margins or edges of the leaf may be red. The leaves form sheaths around the stem with small hairs at their bases. All of the leaves have parallel longitudinal venation.

Below the flower are both its sepals and spathe. The spathe structure is made up of a leaf that grows folded in half lengthwise below the site of floral growth. This leaf is sealed from its apex to stem leaving only an opening at the top for the flower to emerge. The bract is covered in small short hairs.

=== Stems ===
C. erecta grows laterally across the ground reaching up to three feet long, yet it may grow vertically if structurally supported by another plant. The stems are generally rough, but can occasionally be smooth and form many branches.

=== Fruit ===
Commelina e. forms a three carpellate fruit; meaning it has three ovules and may form a seed from each ovule. The fruit typically appears green and can have a smooth to slightly granular surface.

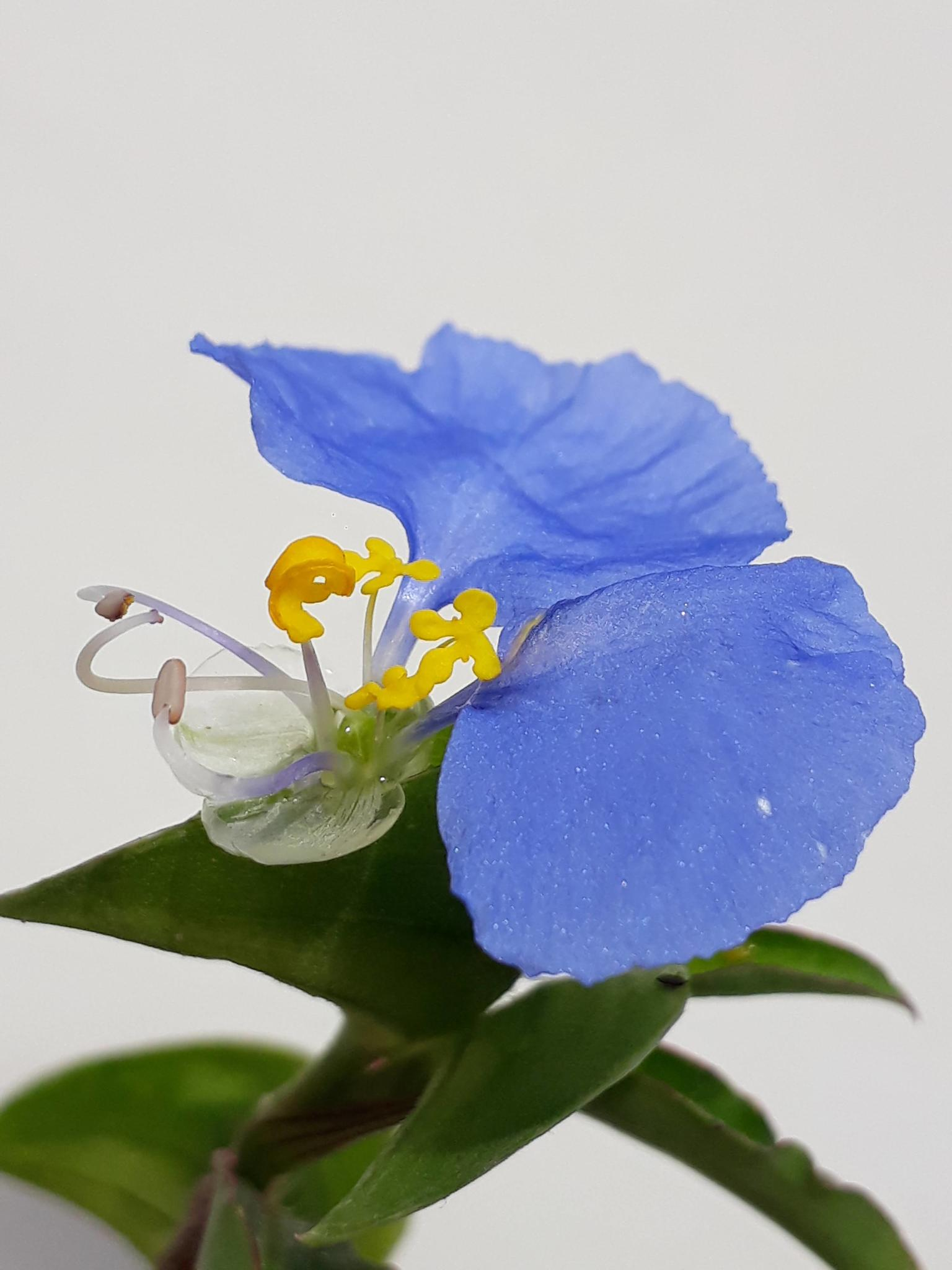
Enantiostyly of C. erecta flower

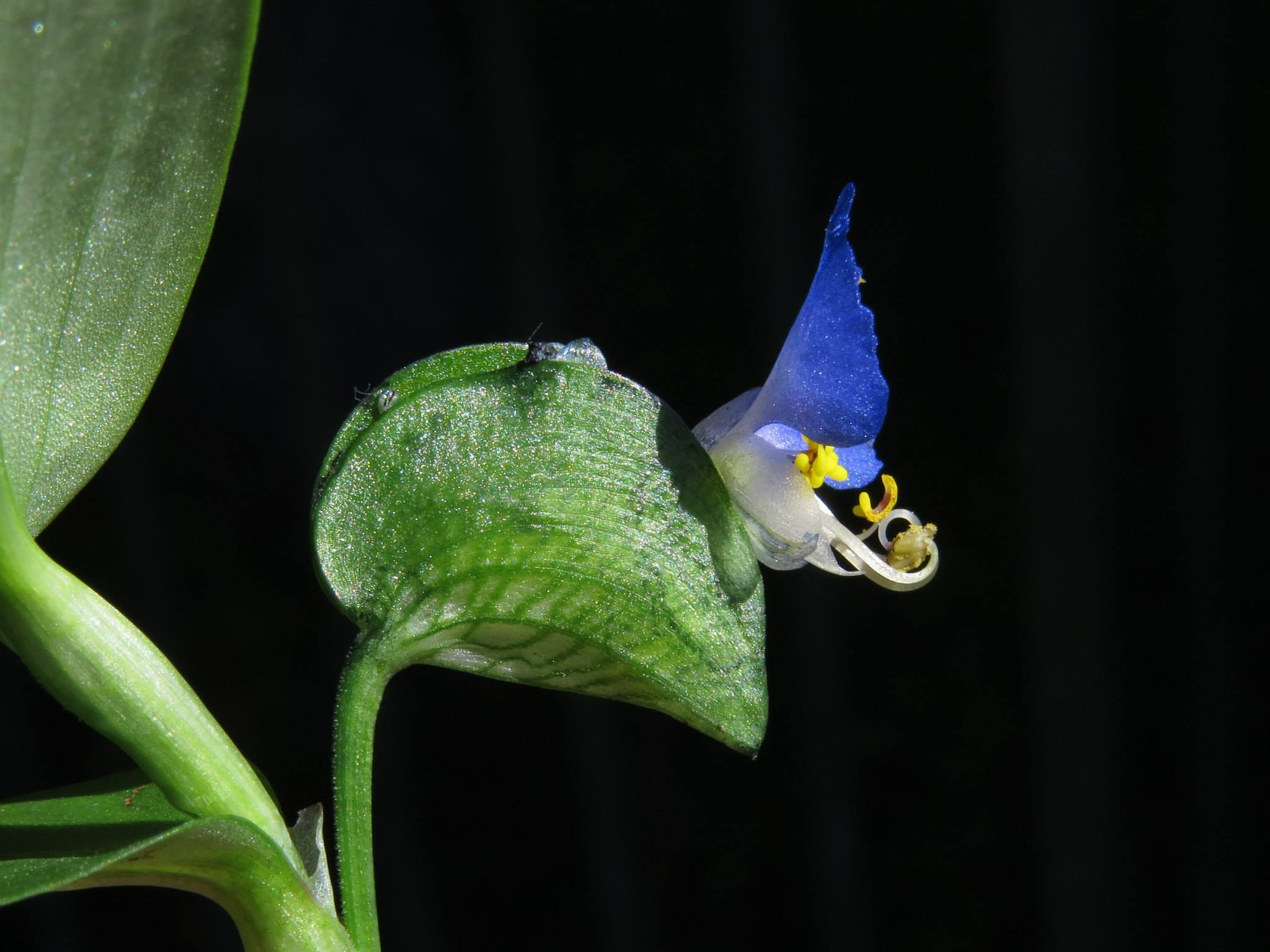
C. erecta Spathe and flower

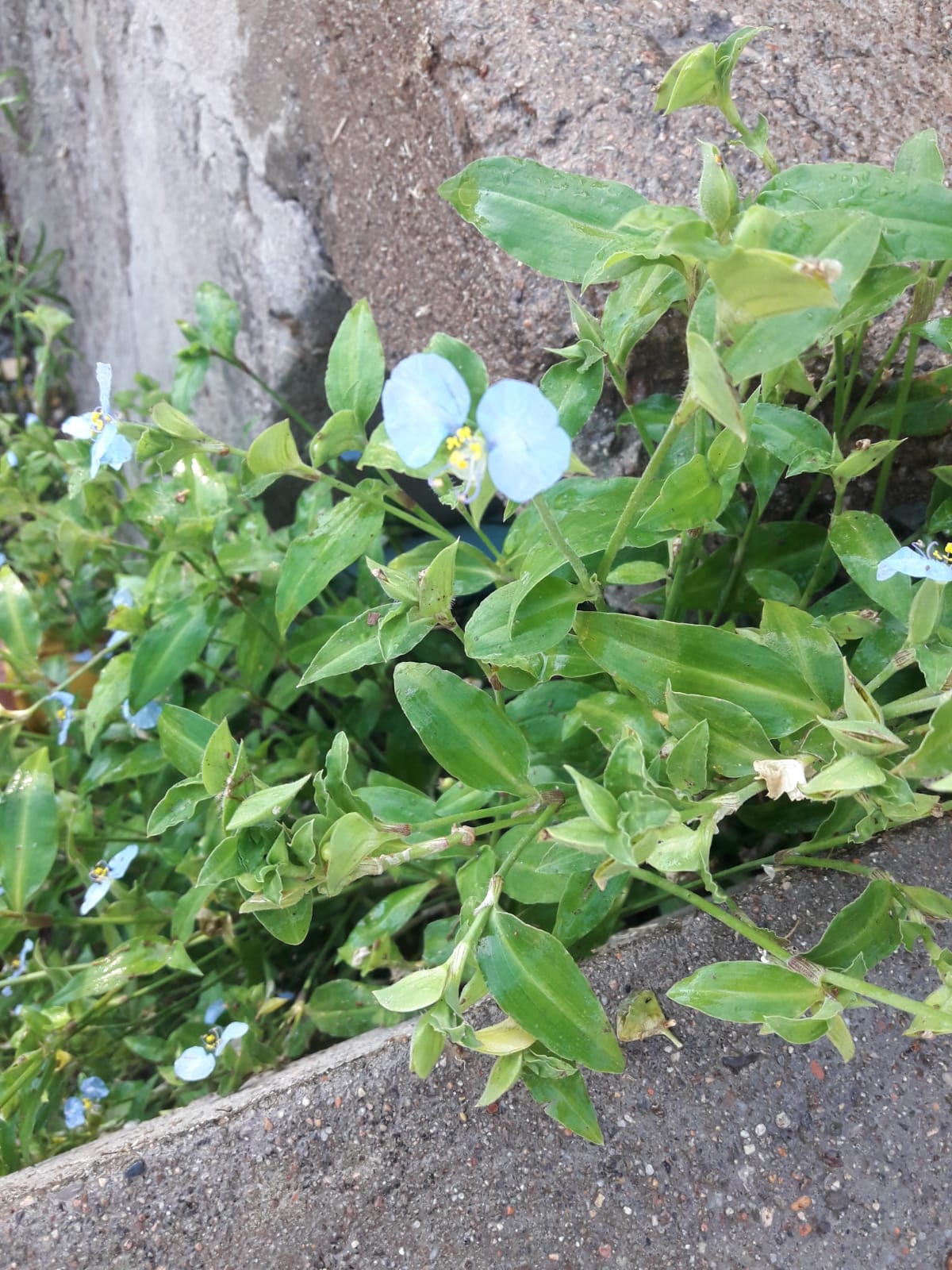
C. erecta growing laterally

== Taxonomy ==
Commelina erecta was named by Charles Plumier to honor the two Botanists of Commelin family Caspar and Jan as well as a third family member who died before accomplishing anything in botany. Plumier intended the two prominent petals of the flower to represent Caspar Commelin and Jan Commelin and for the third diminished petal to represent to unnamed dead Commelin. C. erecta was officially established as a species in 1753 when Linnaeus published it in the Species Planetarium.

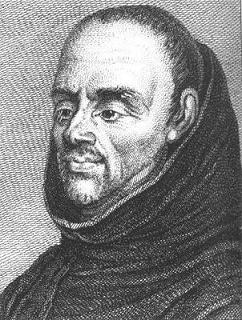
Charles Plumier (1646-1706)

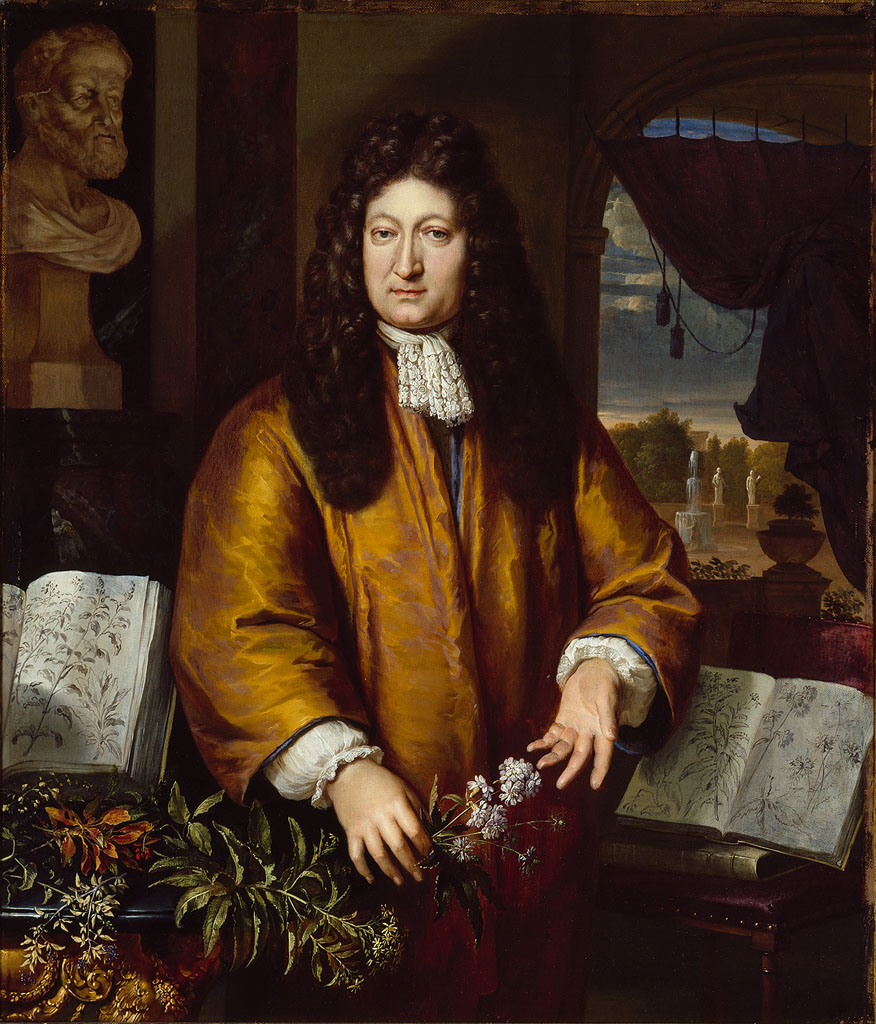
Jan Commelin (1629-1692)

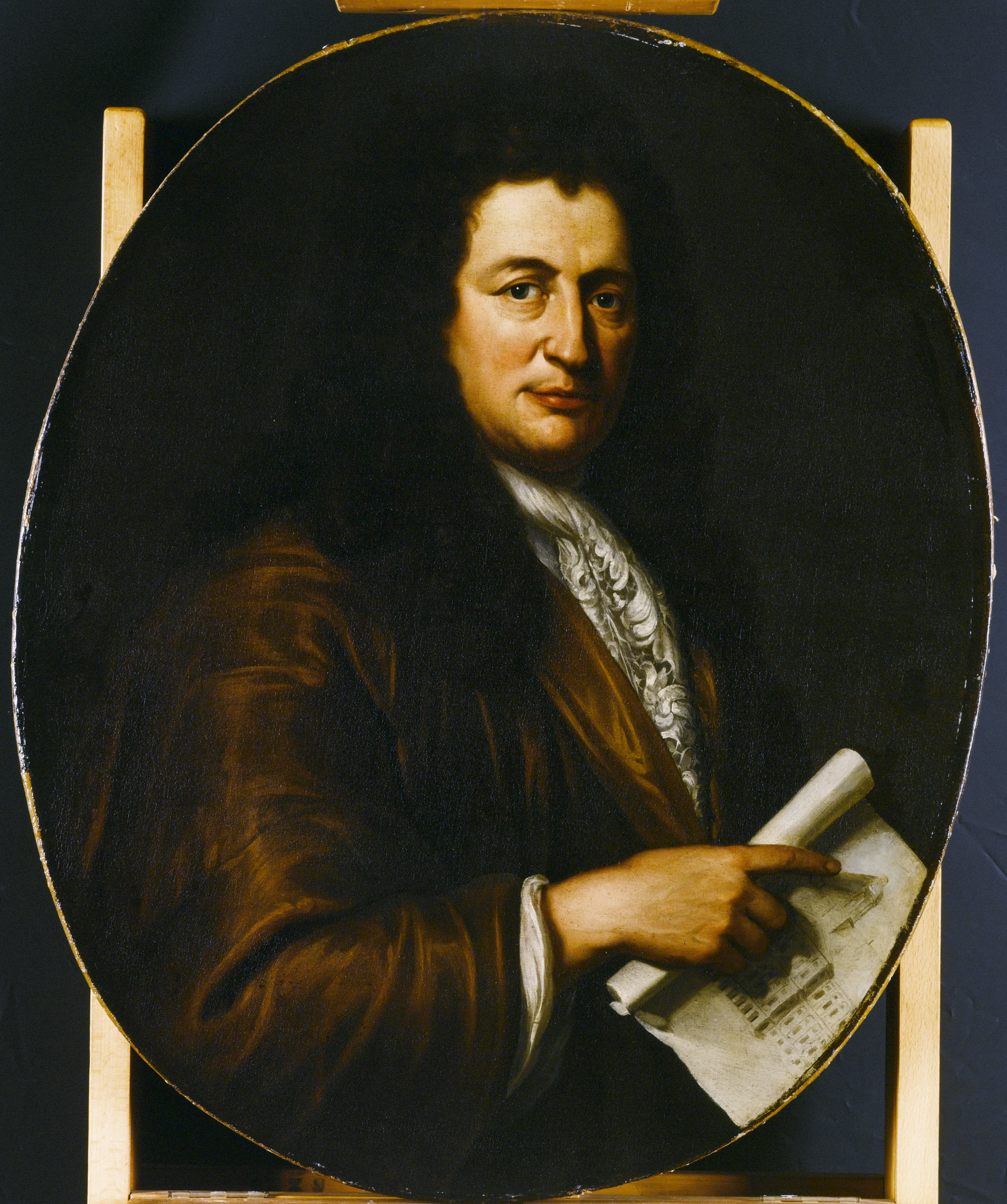
Casper Commelin (1636-1693)

C. erecta has seven 'children' including different varieties, formae, and subspecies. The subspecies are Commelina erecta subsp. erecta, Commelina erecta subsp. livingstonii, and Commelina erecta subsp. maritima. The variants are Commelina erecta var. angustifolia (Michx.) and Commelina erecta var. deamiana. Finally, the forma Commelina erecta f. dielsii (Herter) Bacig and Commelina erecta f. roseopurpurea (Herter) Bacig.

Due to its wide geographical range it has many common names across different languages. In Uruguay it is known as Yerba de Santa Lucı́. In Africaans, C. erecta's preferred name is Blousel Blommetjie.

== Distribution and habitat ==
Commelina erecta is native to much of the world, including the Americas, Africa and western Asia. In the Americas it is present in the United States, the West Indies, every country of Central America and south through the tropics into Argentina. In the United States it can be found from South Dakota and Pennsylvania down to Florida and Texas.

In the West Indies it is present throughout Puerto Rico and on several of the Virgin Islands such as Saint Croix, Saint Thomas, Saint John, George Dog Island, Anegada, Great Camanoe, Guana Island, Tortola and Water Island.

The plant is also widespread though. In west Africa it is present in Senegal, Guinea, Guinea-Bissau, Sierra Leone, Liberia, the Ivory Coast, Ghana, Burkina Faso, Benin, Nigeria, and Bioko.

It can grow in a wide range of habitats, both natural and disturbed, including prairies, streambanks, gardens, and roadsides.

=== Ecology ===
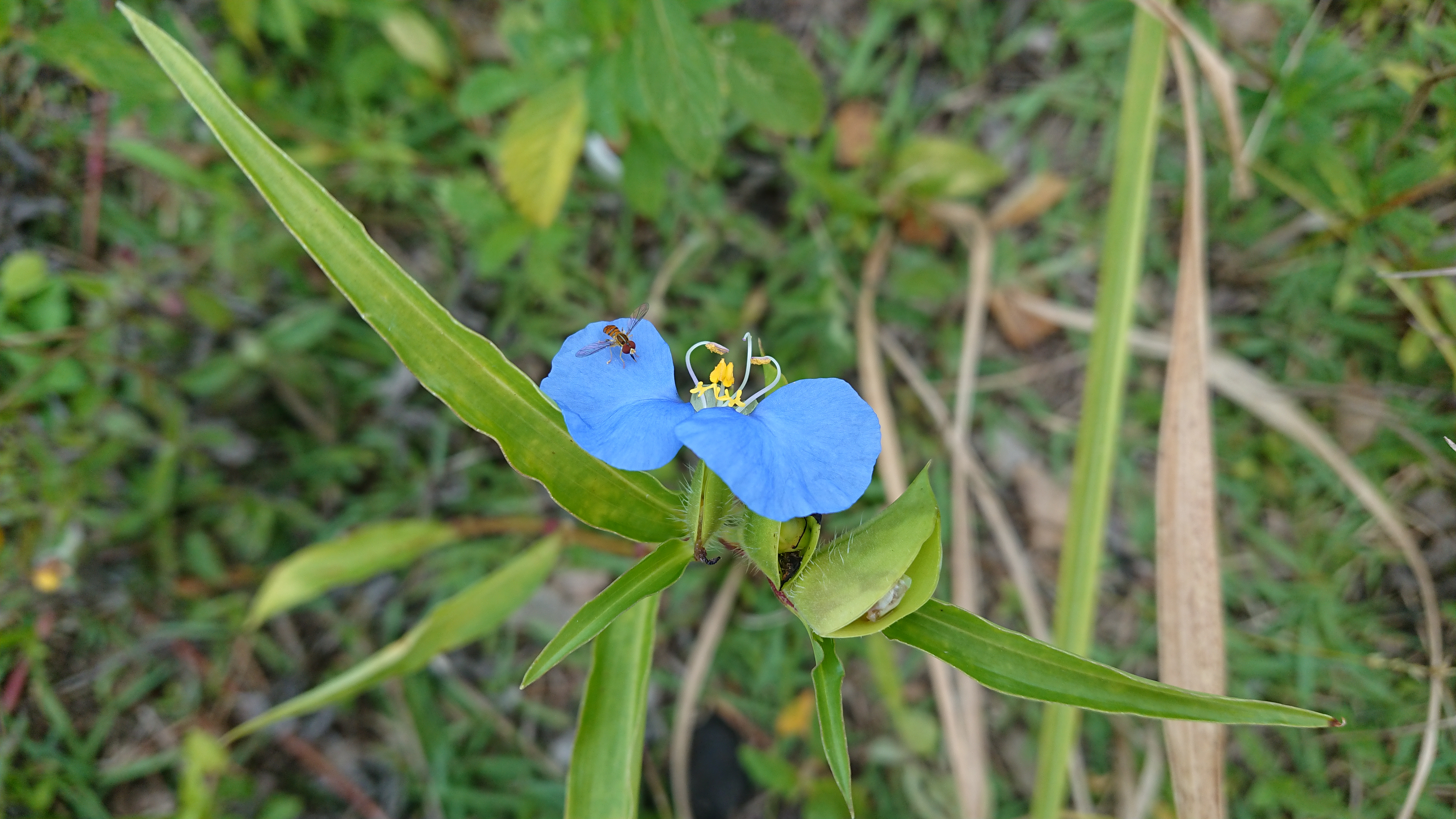
Fly preparing to pollinate C. erecta

In North America, C. erecta is often eaten by the Bobwhite Quail (Northern Bobwhite) the Lesser Prairie-Chicken, white-tailed deer, and cattle. C. erecta is often pollinated and visited by flies and bees including Syrphid flies, Two-spotted Long-horned Bees, Lasioglossum nymphale, Pure Green Augochlora, and Green Metallic Sweat Bees. C. erecta can also be parasitized by Liriomyza commelinae.

== Uses ==
C. erecta is a wild edible plant and is consumed by many groups of people across its distribution. It is also used as a traditional medicine is some groups. C. erecta is commonly consumed and used as a traditional medicine in Brazil, and analysis of its bioactive compounds shows that can act as an antioxidant, antibacterial, antifungal, and anti-inflammatory agent.

In Uruguay, it is commonly made into a juice to treat eye infections. C. erecta is also used by the Seminole to sooth irritation.

=== Cultivation ===
C. erecta typically blooms in North America from May to October. It grows best in partial shade in dry sandy soil. C. erecta can be grown by seed or by transplanting tubers. C. erecta is widely considered a weed across its domain and can be invasive so planting should be done carefully.
