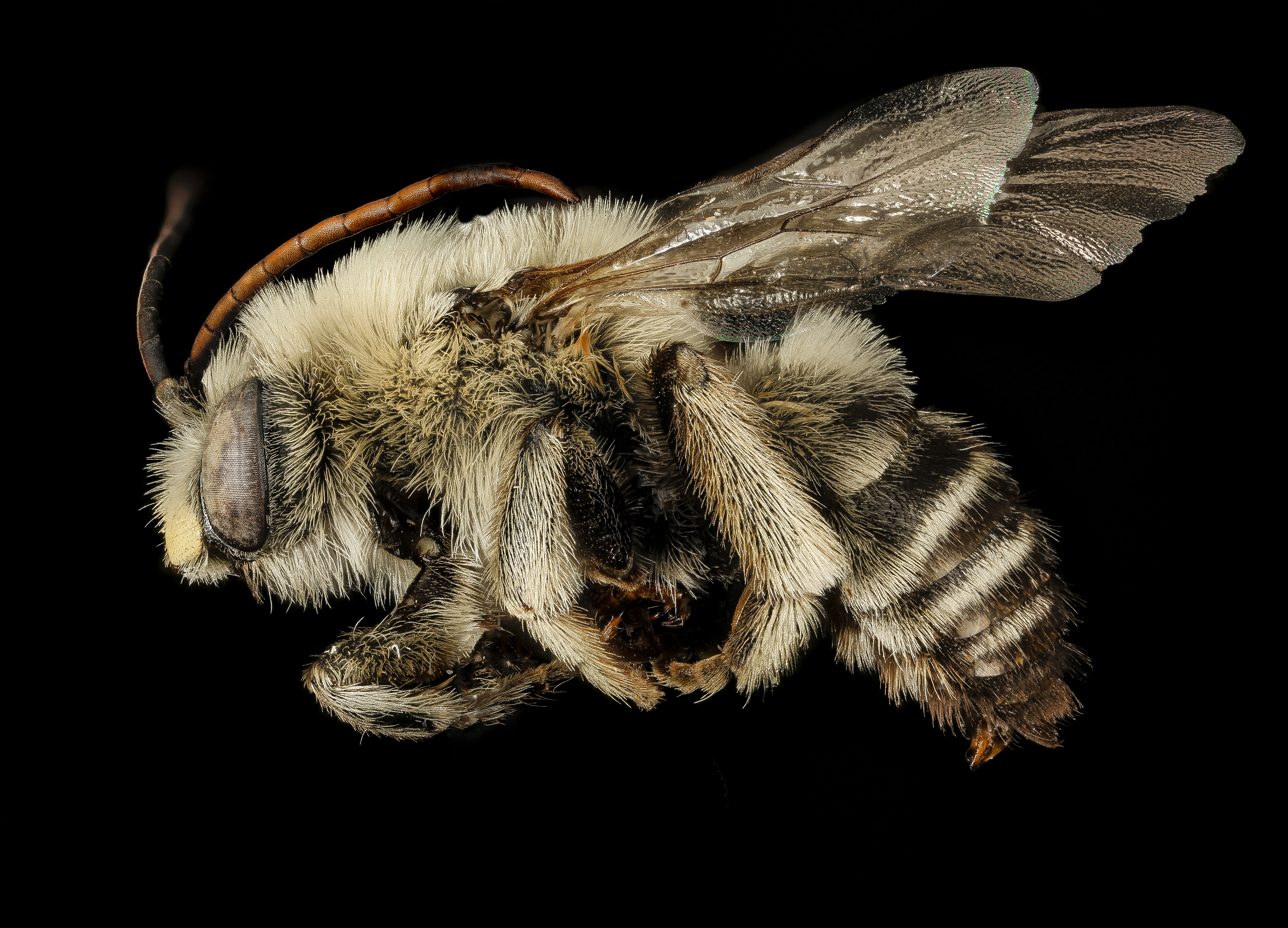

Scientific classification
- Kingdom: Animalia
- Phylum: Arthropoda
- Class: Insecta
- Order: Hymenoptera
- Family: Apidae
- Genus: Melissodes
- Species: M. rivalis

Binomial name
- Melissodes rivalis Cresson, 1872

= Melissodes rivalis =

Species of long-horned bee native to Montana

Melissodes rivalis, the rival long-horned bee, is a species of long-horned bee in the family Apidae. It is most commonly found in northern parts of the United States, as well as Canada. This species is native to Montana, although it has also been spotted in other northern states including Idaho, Wyoming, and Minnesota. As a part of the Eucerini tribe, this species' male has unusually long antennae, as well as being a solitary bee, therefore, it does not create colonies or store honey, though some may form large aggregations. Unlike colonial bees, the female Melissodes rivalis constructs and provisions her own fossorial nest without outside help, while males tend to sleep in flower heads.

== Taxonomy and phylogeny ==
Melissodes rivalis is a member of the Eucerini tribe which includes more than 780 different bee species split up into 32 different genera making this tribe the most diverse in the family Apidea, though the distinguishing line between each genera remains ambiguous with many small and still unclear having the bulk of the species belong to the same five genera including Melissodes having over 140 different species.

== Description and identification ==
Melissodes rivalis is a long-horned bee placed in the tribe Eucerini, the "true horned bees"; they are 11–14 millimetres (0.45–0.55 in) from abdomen to thorax, with the male's antennae occasionally being longer than their bodies. Like other true horned bees, its body and legs are covered in a layer of setae made for collecting pollen. Melissodes rivalis have an elongated body slightly resembling a common honey bee, be it smaller, with a dark gray abdomen stripped with white or cream colored hairs. These bees have hyaline wings with their apical margins being a faintly cloudier beige.

== Location and Habitat ==
Melissodes rivalis is Native to Montana, but can also currently be found in other northern states such as Idaho, Wyoming, and Minnesota. This bee has also bee recognized in southern provinces of Canada including British Columbia, Alberta, Saskatchewan, and Manitoba. M.rivalis has been seen natively pollinating Cirsium sp.

=== Nesting ===
Females of M.rivalis construct fossorial nests, which is typical of bees within the Melissodes genus. As a solitary bee, the females will solely create and protect their nests without help from a hive. To make these nests, the female will find a suitable hiding place, most likely under a bush or other brush plant and carve a hole in the ground. She will then line this hole with a waxlike material creating a single brood celled nest. These nest typically hold one egg and a pollen ball; usually the nests are isolated, but can be seen in groups. Though not explicitly stated why males sleep in large aggregations atop flower heads, we can look at other very similar Melissodes species within the same geographic location that have near identical mannerisms to M.rivalis such as Melissodes agilis, and infer that males most likely do this for warmth and protection. These aggregations typically have no relation to the location of female nests and have more to do with resource and perch availability, though this is just speculation.
