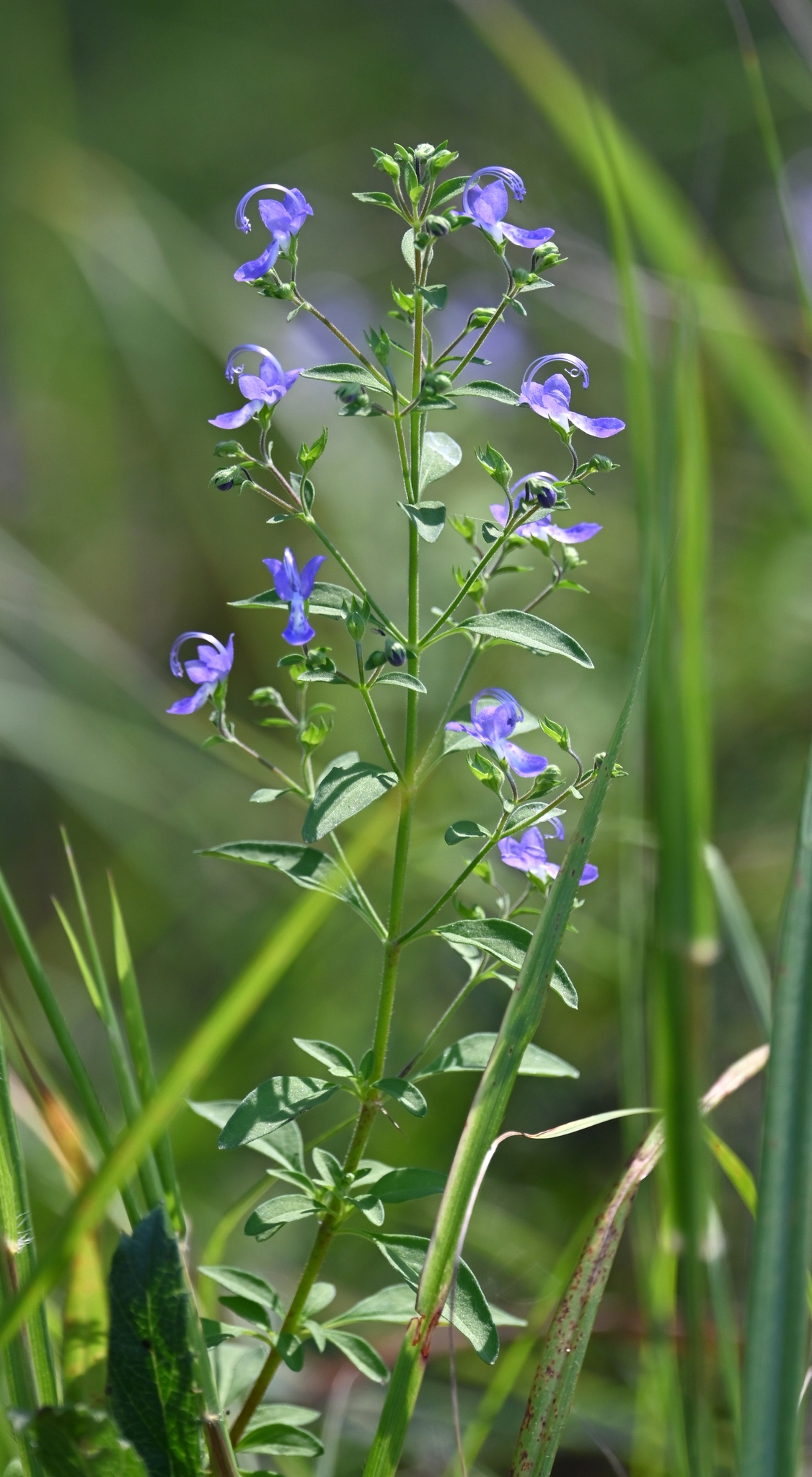
- Trichostema dichotomum inflorescence

Conservation status
- Secure (NatureServe)

Scientific classification
- Kingdom: Plantae
- Clade: Embryophytes
- Clade: Tracheophytes
- Clade: Spermatophytes
- Clade: Angiosperms
- Clade: Eudicots
- Clade: Asterids
- Order: Lamiales
- Family: Lamiaceae
- Genus: Trichostema
- Species: T. dichotomum

Binomial name
- Trichostema dichotomum L.

= Trichostema dichotomum =

Forked bluecurls

Species of flowering plant

Trichostema dichotomum, commonly known as forked bluecurls, is a flowering plant in the mint family (Lamiaceae). The plant is found in the Midwestern and Eastern United States, and Eastern Canada.

== Description ==
Trichostema dichotomum is an annual herbaceous forb with opposite, simple leaves, and square, erect, hairy stems. The leaves are covered in small hairs.

The flowers are blue, borne in late summer through mid autumn, and the stems bear glandular hairs that are fragrant when disturbed. Each flower blooms only for half a day, opening in the morning and dropping its petals and stamens by the afternoon.

== Ecology ==
This plant germinates early in the summer and grows in sunny, moderately dry, sandy areas, including sandhills, open woodlands, glades, and disturbed areas. It is an important nectar producer for bees, including Caupolicana electa and Dialictus placidensis.

Trichostema dichotomum is insect pollinated and is recorded to have been visited in northern Florida by Augochloropsis metallica, Bombus impatiens, Lasioglossum apopkense, Lasioglossum reticulatum, and Melissodes bimaculatus.
