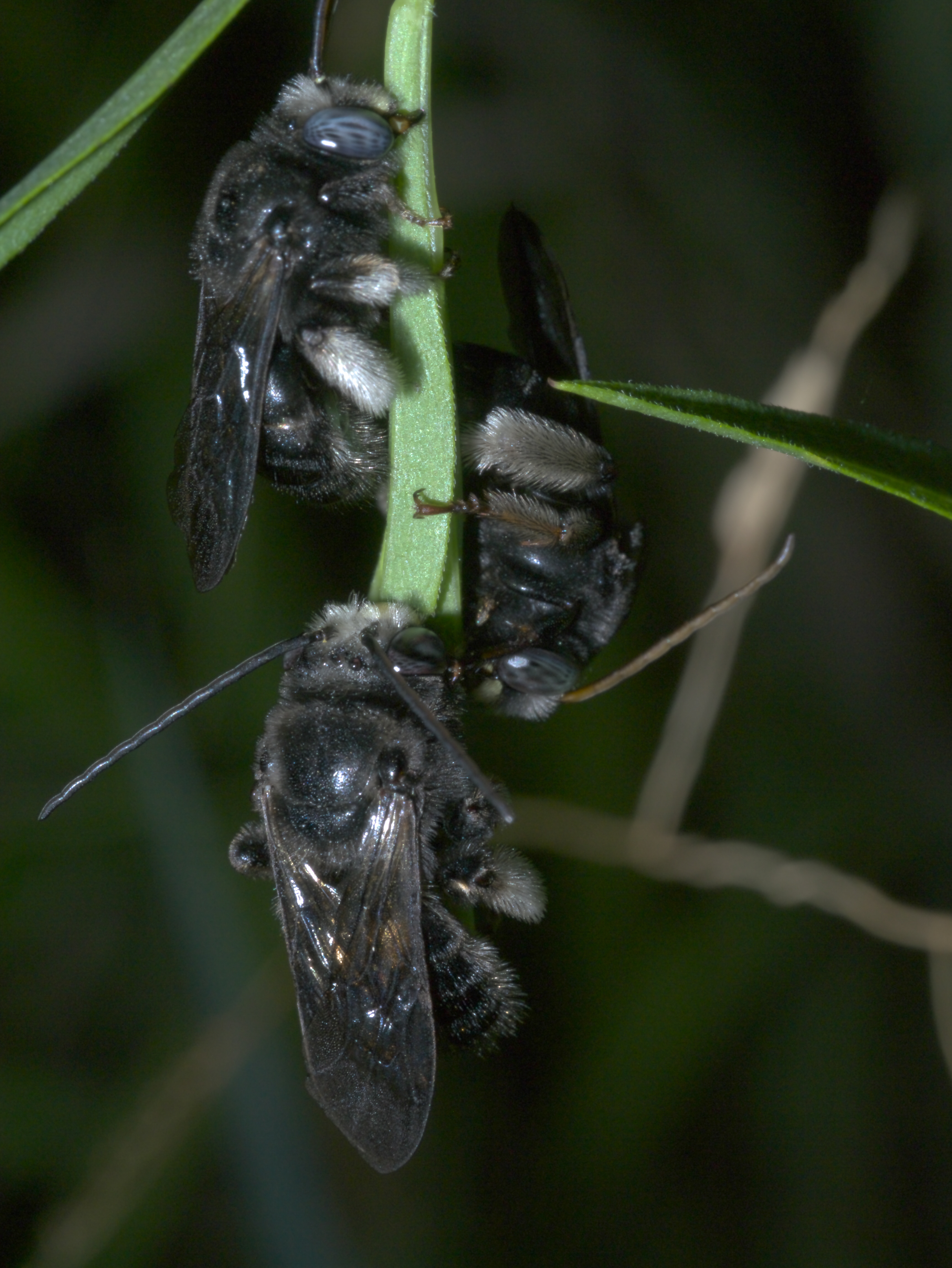

Scientific classification
- Kingdom: Animalia
- Phylum: Arthropoda
- Class: Insecta
- Order: Hymenoptera
- Family: Apidae
- Genus: Melissodes
- Species: M. bimaculatus

Binomial name
- Melissodes bimaculatus (Lepeletier, 1825)

= Melissodes bimaculatus =

Species of bee

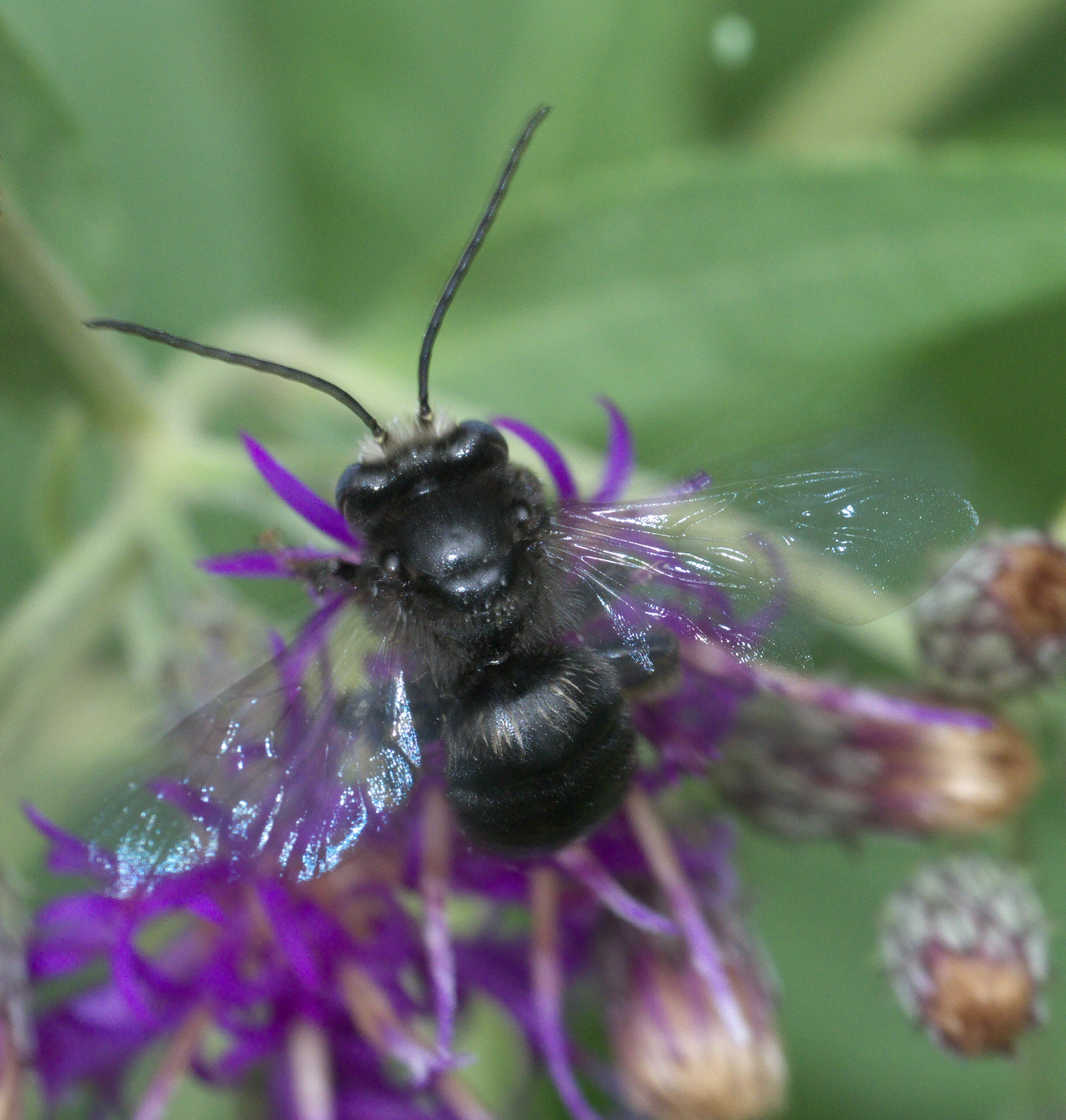
Two-spotted longhorn, Melissodes bimaculata

Melissodes bimaculatus, the two-spotted longhorn, is a species of long-horned bee in the family Apidae.

== Subspecies ==
These two subspecies belong to the species Melissodes bimaculatus:

- Melissodes bimaculatus bimaculatus (Lepeletier, 1825)
- Melissodes bimaculatus nullus LaBerge, 1956
